= C-type lectin =

Lectin C-type domain
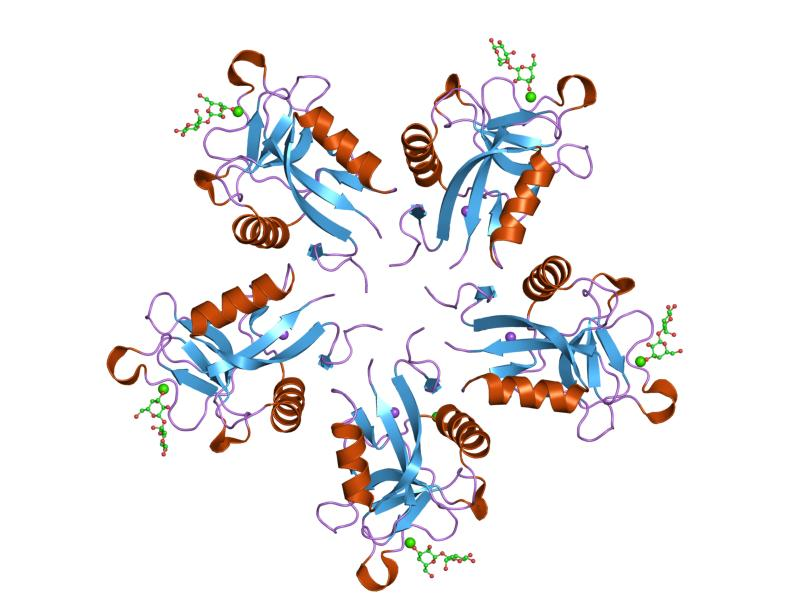
- Pentameric structure of rattlesnake venom lectin which is a galactose binding lectin.

Identifiers
- Symbol: Lectin_C
- Pfam: PF00059
- InterPro: IPR001304
- SMART: CLECT
- PROSITE: PS50041
- SCOP2: 2msb / SCOPe / SUPFAM
- CDD: cd00037
Available protein structures:
- PDB: IPR001304 PF00059 (ECOD; PDBsum)
- AlphaFold: IPR001304; PF00059

A C-type lectin (CLEC) is a type of carbohydrate-binding protein known as a lectin. The C-type designation is from their requirement for calcium for binding. Proteins that contain C-type lectin domains have a diverse range of functions including cell-cell adhesion, immune response to pathogens and apoptosis.

== Classification ==
Drickamer et al. classified C-type lectins into seven subgroups (I to VII) based on the order of the various protein domains in each protein. This classification was subsequently updated in 2002, leading to seven additional groups (VIII to XIV). Most recently, three further subgroups were added (XV to XVII).

Group	Name	Associated domains
I	Lecticans	EGF, Sushi, Ig and Link domains
II	Asialoglycoprotein and DC receptors	None
III	Collectins	None
IV	Selectins	Sushi and EGF domains
V	NK - cell receptors	None
VI	Multi-CTLD endocytic receptors	FnII and Ricin domains
VII	Reg group	None
VIII	Chondrolectin, Layilin	None
IX	Tetranectin	None
X	Polycystin	WSC, REJ, PKD domains
XI	Attractin (ATRN)	PSI, EGF and CUB domains
XII	Eosinophil major basic protein (EMBP)	None
XIII	DGCR2	None
XIV	Thrombomodulin, CD93, CD248, CLEC14A	EGF domains
XV	Bimlec	None
XVI	SEEC	SCP and EGF domains
XVII	CBCP/Frem1/QBRICK	CSPG repeats and CalX-beta domains

CLECs include:

- CLEC1A, CLEC1B
- CLEC2A, CLEC2B, CD69 (CLEC2C), CLEC2D, CLEC2L
- CLEC3A, CLEC3B
- CLEC4A, CLEC4C, CLEC4D, CLEC4E, CLEC4F, CLEC4G, ASGR1 (CLEC4H1), ASGR2 (CLEC4H2), FCER2 (CLEC4J), CD207 (CLEC4K), CD209 (CLEC4L), CLEC4M
- CLEC5A
- CLEC6A
- CLEC7A
- OLR1 (CLEC8A)
- CLEC9A
- CLEC10A
- CLEC11A
- CLEC12A, CLEC12B
- CD302 (CLEC13A), LY75 (CLEC13B), PLA2R1 (CLEC13C), MRC1 (CLEC13D), MRC2 (CLEC13E)
- CLEC14A
- CLEC16A
- CLEC17A

The "NK Cell lectin-like receptors" are a very closely related group:

- KLRA1
- KLRB1 (CLEC5B)
- KLRC1, KLRC2, KLRC3, KLRC4
- KLRD1
- KLRF1 (CLEC5C)
- KLRG1 (CLEC15A), KLRG2 (CLEC15B)
- KLRK1

Additional proteins containing this domain include:

- AGC1; ATRNL1
- BCAN
- CD248; CD72; CD93; CHODL; CL-K1-Ia; CL-K1-Ib; CL-K1-Ic; CLECSF5; COLEC10; COLEC11; COLEC12; CSPG3
- FCER2; FREM1; HBXBP;
- LAYN; LOC348174; LOC728276
- MAFA; MBL2; MGC34761; MICL; MRC1L1
- OLR1
- PAP; PKD1; PKD1L2; PLA2R1; PRG2; PRG3
- REG1A; REG1B; REG3A; REG3G; REG4
- SELE; SELL; SELP; SFTPA1; SFTPA2; SFTPA2B; SFTPD; SRCL
- THBD
- VCAN
