= Pattern recognition receptor =

Family of cell surface receptors

Pattern recognition receptors (PRRs) play a crucial role in the proper function of the innate immune system. PRRs are germline-encoded host sensors, which detect molecules typical for the pathogens. They are proteins expressed mainly by cells of the innate immune system, such as dendritic cells, macrophages, monocytes, neutrophils, as well as by epithelial cells, to identify two classes of molecules: pathogen-associated molecular patterns (PAMPs), which are associated with microbial pathogens, and damage-associated molecular patterns (DAMPs), which are associated with components of host's cells that are released during cell damage or death. They are also called primitive pattern recognition receptors because they evolved before other parts of the immune system, particularly before adaptive immunity. PRRs also mediate the initiation of antigen-specific adaptive immune response and release of inflammatory cytokines. PRRs are regulated through a variety of pathways ensure optimal immune and inflammatory response to invaders.

The microbe-specific molecules that are recognized by a given PRR are called pathogen-associated molecular patterns (PAMPs) and include bacterial carbohydrates (such as lipopolysaccharide or LPS, mannose), nucleic acids (such as bacterial or viral DNA or RNA), bacterial peptides (flagellin, microtubule elongation factors), peptidoglycans and lipoteichoic acids (from Gram-positive bacteria), N-formylmethionine, lipoproteins and fungal glucans and chitin. PRRs exhibit significant diversity in coevolution with PAMPs. Endogenous stress signals are called damage-associated molecular patterns (DAMPs) and include uric acid and extracellular ATP, among many other compounds. There are several subgroups of PRRs. They are classified according to their ligand specificity, function, localization and/or evolutionary relationships.

== Types and signaling ==
Based on their localization, PRRs may be divided into membrane-bound PRRs and cytoplasmic PRRs:

- Membrane-bound PRRs include toll-like receptors (TLRs) and C-type lectin receptors (CLRs).
- Cytoplasmic PRRs include NOD-like receptors (NLRs) and RIG-I-like receptors (RLRs).

PRRs were first discovered in plants. Since that time many plant PRRs have been predicted by genomic analysis (370 in rice; 47 in Arabidopsis). Unlike animal PRRs, which are associated with intracellular kinases via adaptor proteins (see non-RD kinases below), plant PRRs are composed of an extracellular domain, transmembrane domain, juxtamembrane domain and intracellular kinase domain as part of a single protein.

=== Toll-like receptors (TLR) ===
Recognition of extracellular or endosomal pathogen-associated molecular patterns is mediated by transmembrane proteins known as toll-like receptors (TLRs). TLRs share a typical structural motif, the leucine rich repeats (LRR), which give them their specific appearance and are also responsible for TLR functionality. Toll-like receptors were first discovered in Drosophila and trigger the synthesis and secretion of cytokines and activation of other host defense programs that are necessary for both innate or adaptive immune responses. 10 functional members of the TLR family have been described in humans so far. Studies have been conducted on TLR11 as well, and it has been shown that it recognizes flagellin and profilin-like proteins in mice. Nonetheless, TLR11 is only a pseudogene in humans without direct function or functional protein expression. Each of the TLR has been shown to interact with a specific PAMP.

==== TLR signaling ====
TLRs tend to dimerize, TLR4 forms homodimers, and TLR6 can dimerize with either TLR1 or TLR2. Interaction of TLRs with their specific PAMP is mediated through either MyD88-dependent pathway and triggers the signaling through NF-κB and the MAP kinase pathway and therefore the secretion of pro-inflammatory cytokines and co-stimulatory molecules or TRIF – dependent signaling pathway. MyD88 – dependent pathway is induced by various PAMPs stimulating the TLRs on macrophages and dendritic cells. MyD88 attracts the IRAK4 molecule, IRAK4 recruits IRAK1 and IRAK2 to form a signaling complex. The signaling complex reacts with TRAF6 which leads to TAK1 activation and consequently the induction of inflammatory cytokines. The TRIF-dependent pathway is induced by macrophages and DCs after TLR3 and TLR4 stimulation. Molecules released following TLR activation signal to other cells of the immune system making TLRs key elements of innate immunity and adaptive immunity.

=== C-type lectin receptors (CLR) ===
Many different cells of the innate immune system express a myriad of CLRs which shape innate immunity by virtue of their pattern recognition ability. Even though, most classes of human pathogens are covered by CLRs, CLRs are a major receptor for recognition of fungi: nonetheless, other PAMPs have been identified in studies as targets of CLRs as well e.g. mannose is the recognition motif for many viruses, fungi and mycobacteria; similarly fucose presents the same for certain bacteria and helminths; and glucans are present on mycobacteria and fungi. In addition, many of acquired nonself surfaces e.g. carcinoembryonic/oncofetal type neoantigens carrying "internal danger source"/"self turned nonself" type pathogen pattern are also identified and destroyed (e.g. by complement fixation or other cytotoxic attacks) or sequestered (phagocytosed or ensheathed) by the immune system by virtue of the CLRs. The name lectin is a bit misleading because the family includes proteins with at least one C-type lectin domain (CTLD) which is a specific type of carbohydrate recognition domain. CTLD is a ligand binding motif found in more than 1000 known proteins (more than 100 in humans) and the ligands are often not sugars. If and when the ligand is sugar they need Ca2+ – hence the name "C-type", but many of them do not even have a known sugar ligand thus despite carrying a lectin type fold structure, some of them are technically not "lectin" in function.

==== CLR signaling ====
There are several types of signaling involved in CLRs induced immune response, major connection has been identified between TLR and CLR signaling, therefore we differentiate between TLR-dependent and TLR-independent signaling. DC-SIGN leading to RAF1-MEK-ERK cascade, BDCA2 signaling via ITAM and signaling through ITIM belong among the TLR-dependent signaling. TLR-independent signaling such as Dectin 1, and Dectin 2 – mincle signaling lead to MAP kinase and NFkB activation.

Membrane receptor CLRs have been divided into 17 groups based on structure and phylogenetic origin. Generally there is a large group, which recognizes and binds carbohydrates, so called carbohydrate recognition domains (CRDs) and the previously mentioned CTLDs.

Another potential characterization of the CLRs can be into mannose receptors and asialoglycoprotein receptors.

==== Group I CLRs: The mannose receptors ====
The mannose receptor (MR) is a PRR primarily present on the surface of macrophages and dendritic cells. It belongs into the calcium-dependent multiple CRD group. The MR belongs to the multilectin receptor protein group and, like the TLRs, provides a link between innate and adaptive immunity. It recognizes and binds to repeated mannose units on the surfaces of infectious agents and its activation triggers endocytosis and phagocytosis of the microbe via the complement system. Specifically, mannose binding triggers recruitment of MBL-associated serine proteases (MASPs). The serine proteases activate themselves in a cascade, amplifying the immune response: MBL interacts with C4, binding the C4b subunit and releasing C4a into the bloodstream; similarly, binding of C2 causes release of C2b. Together, MBL, C4b and C2a are known as the C3 convertase. C3 is cleaved into its a and b subunits, and C3b binds the convertase. These together are called the C5 convertase. Similarly again, C5b is bound and C5a is released. C5b recruits C6, C7, C8 and multiple C9s. C5, C6, C7, C8 and C9 form the membrane attack complex (MAC).

==== Group II CLRs: asialoglycoprotein receptor family ====
This is another large superfamily of CLRs that includes the classic asialoglycoprotein receptor macrophage galactose-type lectin (MGL), DC-SIGN (CLEC4L), Langerin (CLEC4K), Myeloid DAP12‑associating lectin (MDL)‑1 (CLEC5A), DC‑associated C‑type lectin 1 (Dectin1) subfamily, and DC immunoreceptor (DCIR) subfamily. Furthermore, Dectin subfamily and DCIR subfamily consist of some members as follow. DC‑associated C‑type lectin 1 (Dectin1) subfamily includes dectin 1/CLEC7A, DNGR1/CLEC9A, Myeloid C‑type lectin‑like receptor (MICL) (CLEC12A), CLEC2 (also called CLEC1B)- the platelet activation receptor for podoplanin on lymphatic endothelial cells and invading front of some carcinomas, and CLEC12B; while DC immunoreceptor (DCIR) subfamily includes DCIR/CLEC4A, Dectin 2/CLEC6A, Blood DC antigen 2 (BDCA2) ( CLEC4C), and Mincle i.e. macrophage‑inducible C‑type lectin (CLEC4E).

The nomenclature (mannose versus asialoglycoprotein) is a bit misleading as these the asialoglycoprotein receptors are not necessarily galactose (one of the commonest outer residues of asialo-glycoprotein) specific receptors and even many of this family members can also bind to mannose after which the other group is named.

=== NOD-like receptors (NLR) ===
The NOD-like receptors (NLRs) are cytoplasmic proteins, which recognize bacterial peptidoglycans and mount proinflammatory and antimicrobial immune response. Approximately 20 of these proteins have been found in the mammalian genome and include nucleotide-binding oligomerization domain (NODs), which binds nucleoside triphosphate. Among other proteins the most important are: the MHC Class II transactivator (CIITA), IPAF, BIRC1 etc.

The ligands are currently known for NOD1 and NOD2. NOD1 recognizes a molecule called meso-DAP, which is a peptidoglycan constituent only of Gram negative bacteria. NOD2 proteins recognize intracellular MDP (muramyl dipeptide), which is a peptidoglycan constituent of both Gram positive and Gram negative bacteria. When inactive, NODs are in the cytosol in a monomeric state and they undergo conformational change only after ligand recognition, which leads to their activation. NODs transduce signals in the pathway of NF-κB and MAP kinases via the serine-threonine kinase called RIP2. NODs signal via N-terminal CARD domains to activate downstream gene induction events, and interact with microbial molecules by means of a C-terminal leucine-rich repeat (LRR) region.

The interaction and cooperation among different types of receptors typical for the innate immune system has been established. An interesting cooperation has been discovered between TLRs and NLRs, particularly between TLR4 and NOD1 in response to Escherichia coli infection. Another proof of the cooperation and integration of the entire immune system has been shown in vivo, when TLR signaling was inhibited or disabled, NOD receptors took over role of TLRs.

Like NODs, NLRPs contain C-terminal LRRs, which appear to act as a regulatory domain and may be involved in the recognition of microbial pathogens. Also like NODs, these proteins contain a nucleotide binding site (NBS) for nucleoside triphosphates. Interaction with other proteins (e.g. the adaptor molecule ASC) is mediated via N-terminal pyrin (PYD) domain. There are 14 members of this protein subfamily in humans (called NLRP1 to NLRP14). NLRP3 and NLRP4 are responsible for the inflammasome activation. NLRP3 can be activated and give rise to NLRP3 inflammasome by ATP, bacterial pore-forming toxins, alum and crystals. Alongside the listed molecules, which lead to activation of NLRP3 inflammasome, the assembly and activation can also be induced by K^{+} efflux, Ca^{2+} influx, disruption of lysosomes and ROS originating from mitochondria. The NLRP3 inflammasome is essential for induction of effective immune response. The NLRP3 inflammasome can be induced by a wide range of stimuli in contrast to the NLRP4 inflammasome, which binds more limited number and variety of ligands and works in a complex with NAIP protein.

Other NLRs such as IPAF and NAIP5/Birc1e have also been shown to activate caspase-1 in response to Salmonella and Legionella.

==== NLR signaling ====
Some of these proteins recognize endogenous or microbial molecules or stress responses and form oligomers that, in animals, activate inflammatory caspases (e.g. caspase 1) causing cleavage and activation of important inflammatory cytokines such as IL-1, and/or activate the NF-κB signaling pathway to induce production of inflammatory molecules.

The NLR family is known under several different names, including the CATERPILLER (or CLR) or NOD-LRR family. The most significant members of the NLRs are NOD1 and NOD2. They sense the conserved microbial peptidoglycans in the cytoplasm of the cell and therefore represent another level of immune response after membrane-bound receptors such as TLRs and CLRs. This family of proteins is greatly expanded in plants, and constitutes a core component of plant immune systems.

=== RIG-I-like receptors (RLR) ===
RIG-I and Mda5-mediated signalling pathway.

Three RLR helicases have so far been described: RIG-I and MDA5 (recognizing 5'triphosphate-RNA and dsRNA, respectively), which activate antiviral signaling, and LGP2, which appears to act as a dominant-negative inhibitor. RLRs initiate the release of inflammatory cytokines and type I interferon (IFN I).

==== RLR signaling ====
RLRs are RNA helicases, which have been shown to participate in intracellular recognition of viral double-stranded (ds) and single stranded RNA which recruit factors via twin N-terminal CARD domains to activate antiviral gene programs, which may be exploited in therapy of viral infections. It has been suggested that the main antiviral program induced by RLR is based on ATPase activity. RLRs often interact and create cross-talk with the TLRs in the innate immune response and in regulation of adaptive immune response.

=== Secreted PRRs ===
A number of PRRs do not remain associated with the cell that produces them. Complement receptors, collectins, ficolins, pentraxins such as serum amyloid and C-reactive protein, lipid transferases, peptidoglycan recognition proteins (PGRPs) and the LRR, XA21D are all secreted proteins. One very important collectin is mannan-binding lectin (MBL), a major PRR of the innate immune system that binds to a wide range of bacteria, viruses, fungi and protozoa. MBL predominantly recognizes certain sugar groups on the surface of microorganisms but also binds phospholipids, nucleic acids and non-glycosylated proteins. Once bound to the ligands MBL and Ficolin oligomers recruit MASP1 and MASP2 and initiate the lectin pathway of complement activation which is somewhat similar to the classical complement pathway.

== In plants ==
Plants contain a significant number of PRRs that share remarkable structural and functional similarity with Drosophila Toll and mammalian TLRs. The first PRR identified in plants or animals was the Xa21 protein, conferring resistance to the Gram-negative bacterial pathogen Xanthomonas oryzae pv. oryzae. Since that time two other plants PRRs, Arabidopsis FLS2 (flagellin) and EFR (elongation factor Tu receptor) have been isolated. More than 600 receptor-kinase genes and 57 receptor-like proteins have been reported in the Arabidopsis genome since 2019. Plant PRRs either exist as surface-localized receptor kinases (RKs) or receptor-like proteins (RLPs) that contain multiple ligand-binding ectodomains that perceive PAMPs or DAMPs. The corresponding PAMPs for FLS2 and EFR have been identified. Upon ligand recognition, the plant PRRs transduce "PAMP-triggered immunity" (PTI).

Plant immune systems also encode resistance proteins that resemble NOD-like receptors (see above), that feature NBS and LRR domains and can also carry other conserved interaction domains such as the TIR cytoplasmic domain found in Toll and interleukin receptors. The nucleotide-binding and leucine-rich repeat (NBS-LRR) proteins are required for detecting nonindigenous molecular signatures from pathogens. Plant PRRs are associated with the innate immune system while NBS-LRR proteins are initiated in the adaptive immune system called the effector-triggered immunity.

== NonRD kinases ==
PRRs commonly associate with or contain members of a monophyletic group of kinases called the interleukin-1 receptor-associated kinase (IRAK) family that include Drosophila Pelle, human IRAKs, rice XA21 and Arabidopsis FLS2. In mammals, PRRs can also associate with members of the receptor-interacting protein (RIP) kinase family, distant relatives to the IRAK family. Some IRAK and RIP family kinases fall into a small functional class of kinases termed non-RD, many of which do not autophosphorylate the activation loop. A survey of the yeast, fly, worm, human, Arabidopsis, and rice kinomes (3,723 kinases) revealed that despite the small number of non-RD kinases in these genomes (9–29%), 12 of 15 kinases known or predicted to function in PRR signaling fall into the non-RD class. In plants, all PRRs characterized to date belong to the non-RD class. These data indicate that kinases associated with PRRs can largely be predicted by the lack of a single conserved residue and reveal new potential plant PRR subfamilies.

== Regulation ==
PRRs and associated elements require strict regulation to maximize pathogen defense and minimize self-damage. There are a variety of mechanisms currently known to modulate the regulation of PRRs. At the DNA level: histone modification, transcription factors, and RNA interference with chromatin regulate the transcription of PRR genes. For example, TLRs in humans are primary response genes that switch transcriptional machinery to increasingly produce mature transcripts upon LPS exposure. After transcription, checkpoints during mRNA splicing and transport regulate the survival of miRNA. Notably in plants, miRNA and secondary siRNA production are used to regulate the production of NBR-LRRs. Post-translational regulation also plays an important role, with ubiquitylation, methylation, and phosphorylation emerging as modulators for PRR activity. In animals, it is well known that PRRs rely on phosphorylation of tyrosine rich domains, and expression of phosphatases can inhibit this crucial step in downstream signaling.

== Evolution ==
PRRs and PAMPs are under constant co-evolutionary pressure: this can lead to an expansion in the diversity of PRRs. Prominent examples include the diversity of PRR inceptin receptor, emergence of FLS3 in tomato, diversification of FLS2 recognition profiles in plants, as well as the C-type lectin and Down syndrome cell adhesion molecule in insects. In animals, ongoing research seeks to understand polymorphisms present in Toll-like receptor 4 again the variation of the Lipid A portion of LPS expressed in gram-negative bacteria. PRR diversity can occur in a variety of ways, including gene duplication and neofunctionalization, gene insertion, as well as alternative splicing. PRRs may evolve to target new MAMP epitope or to recognize the same MAMP epitope that has been slightly changed due to mutations in the pathogen. PRR diversity has been shown to correspond with different species that vary in their exposure to pathogens, suggesting that expansion of PRR diversity can occur relatively quickly and are thus under strong evolutionary pressure.

== Clinical significance ==
=== Immunotherapy ===
Research groups have recently conducted extensive research into the involvement and potential use of patient's immune system in the therapy of various diseases, the so-called immunotherapy, including monoclonal antibodies, non-specific immunotherapies, oncolytic virus therapy, T-cell therapy and cancer vaccines. NOD2 has been associated through a loss and gain of function with development of Crohn's disease and early-onset sarcoidosis. Mutations in NOD2 in cooperation with environmental factors lead to development of chronic inflammation in the intestine. Therefore, it has been suggested to treat the disease by inhibiting the small molecules, which are able to modulate the NOD2 signaling, particularly RIP2. Two therapeutics have been approved by FDA so far inhibiting the phosphorylation on RIP2, which is necessary for proper NOD2 functioning, gefitinib and erlotinib. Additionally, research has been conducted on GSK583, a highly specific RIP2 inhibitor, which seems highly promising in inhibiting NOD1 and NOD2 signaling and therefore, limiting inflammation caused by NOD1, NOD2 signaling pathways. Another possibility is to remove the sensor for NOD2, which has been proved efficient in murine models in the effort to suppress the symptoms of Crohn's disease. Type II kinase inhibitors, which are highly specific, have shown promising results in blocking the TNF arising from NOD-dependent pathways, which shows a high potential in treatment of inflammation associated tumors.

=== Infection and carcinogenesis ===
Another possible exploitation of PRRs in human medicine is also related to tumor malignancies of the intestines. Helicobacter pylori has been shown by studies to significantly correlate with the development of a gastrointestinal tumors. In a healthy individual Helicobacter pylori infection is targeted by the combination of PRRs, namely TLRs, NLRs, RLRs and CLR DC-SIGN. In case of their malfunction, these receptors have also been connected to carcinogenesis. When the Helicobacter pylori infection is left to progress in the intestine it develops into chronic inflammation, atrophy and eventually dysplasia leading to development of cancer. Since all types of PRRs play a role in the identification and eradication of the infection, their specific agonists mount a strong immune response to cancers and other PRR-related diseases. The inhibition of TLR2 has been shown to significantly correlate with improved state of the patient and suppression of the gastric adenocarcinoma.

=== Neurodegenerative and metabolic disease ===
The PRRs are also tightly connected to the proper function of neuronal networks and tissues, especially because of their involvement in the processes of inflammation, which are essential for proper function but may cause irreparable damage if not under control. The TLRs are expressed on most cells of the central nervous system (CNS) and they play a crucial role in sterile inflammation. After an injury, they lead to impairment of axonal growth and slow down or even halt the recovery altogether. Another important structure involved in and potentially exploitable in therapy after injury is the inflammasome. Through its induction of proinflammatory cytokines, IL-1β and IL-18, it has been proposed that inhibition of inflammasome may also serve as an efficient therapeutic method. The involvement of inflammasome has also been researched in several other diseases including experimental autoimmune encephalomyelitis (EAE), Alzheimer's and Parkinson's diseases and in atherosclerosis connected with type II diabetes in patients. The suggested therapies include degradation of NLRP3 or inhibit the proinflammatory cytokines.
