= Mannose receptor =

Protein family

Macrophage mannose receptor

Identifiers
- Symbol: MMR
- Membranome: 56

macrophage mannose receptor 1

Identifiers
- Symbol: MRC1
- Alt. symbols: CD206
- NCBI gene: 4360
- HGNC: 7228
- OMIM: 153618
- RefSeq: NM_002438
- UniProt: P22897

Other data
- Locus: Chr. 10 p13
Search for
- Structures: Swiss-model
- Domains: InterPro

macrophage mannose receptor 2

Identifiers
- Symbol: MRC2
- Alt. symbols: CD280
- NCBI gene: 9902
- HGNC: 16875
- RefSeq: NM_006039
- UniProt: Q9UBG0

Other data
- Locus: Chr. 17 q23
Search for
- Structures: Swiss-model
- Domains: InterPro

The mannose receptor (Cluster of Differentiation 206, CD206) is a C-type lectin primarily present on the surface of macrophages, immature dendritic cells and liver sinusoidal endothelial cells, but is also expressed on the surface of skin cells such as human dermal fibroblasts and keratinocytes. It is the first member of a family of endocytic receptors that includes Endo180 (CD280), M-type PLA2R, and DEC-205 (CD205).

The receptor recognises terminal mannose, N-acetylglucosamine and fucose residues on glycans attached to proteins found on the surface of some microorganisms, playing a role in both the innate and adaptive immune systems. Additional functions include clearance of glycoproteins from circulation, including sulphated glycoprotein hormones and glycoproteins released in response to pathological events. The mannose receptor recycles continuously between the plasma membrane and endosomal compartments in a clathrin-dependent manner.

== Structure ==
=== Domain organisation ===
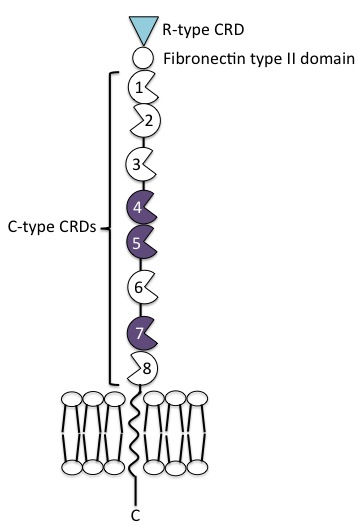
Domain organisation of the mannose receptor, adapted from Introduction to Glycobiology.

The mannose receptor is a type I transmembrane protein, with an extracellular N-terminus and an intracellular C-terminus. It is first synthesised as an inactive precursor, but is proteolytically cleaved to its active form in the Golgi apparatus. In general, The extracellular portion of the receptor is composed of 8 consecutive C-type carbohydrate recognition domains (CRDs) closest to the plasma membrane, followed by a single fibronectin type II repeat domain and an N-terminal cysteine-rich domain. The cytoplasmic tail is not capable of signal transduction in isolation, since it lacks the appropriate signaling motifs.

=== N-terminal cysteine-rich domain ===
The N-terminal cysteine-rich domain is homologous to the ricin B chain and binds to sulphated sugar moieties, with particularly high affinity for N-Acetylgalactosamine and galactose residues sulphated at positions 3 and 4 of their pyranose rings.

Other ligands include chondroitin sulfates A and B, as well as sulphated Lewis^{x} and Lewis^{a} structures. The mannose receptor is the only member of the family in which this domain is functional.

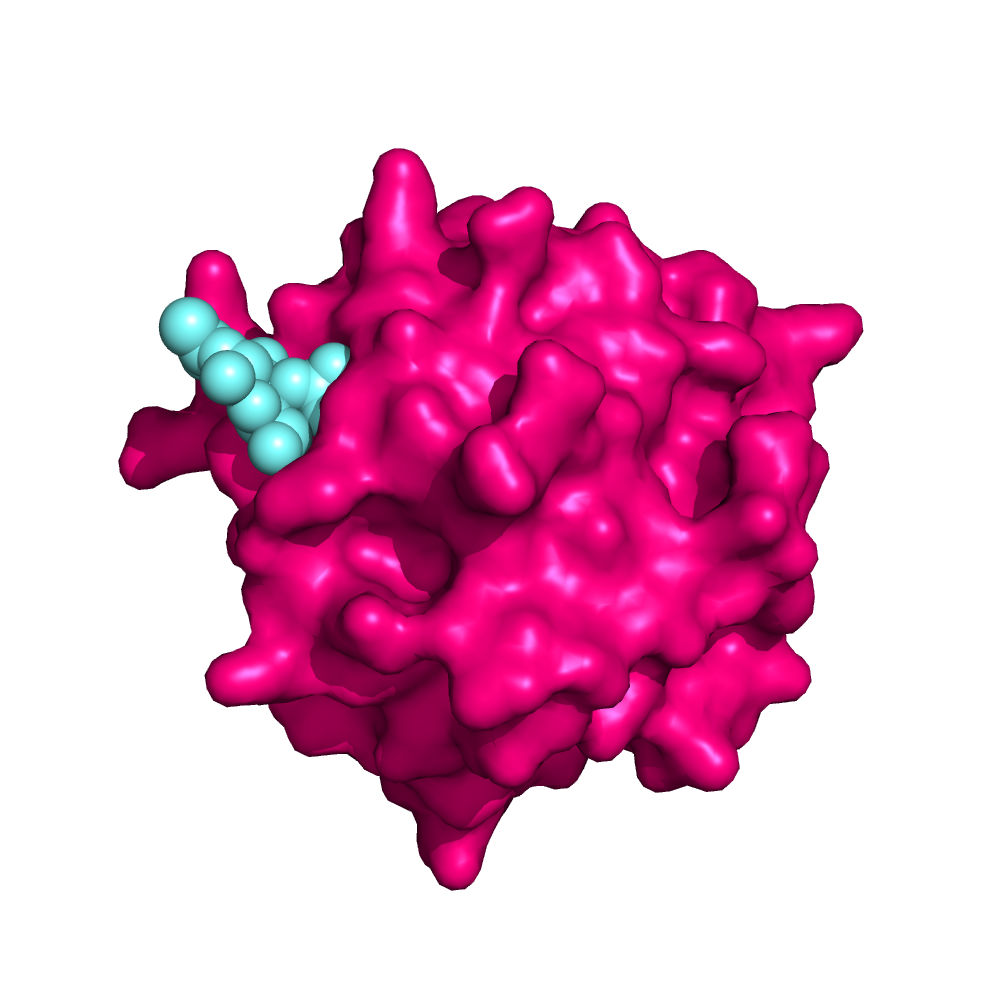
The mannose receptor N-terminal cysteine-rich domain (pink) bound to its sulphated N-Acetylgalactosamine ligand (cyan). PBD ID: 1DQO

=== Fibronectin type II repeat domain ===
The fibronectin type II repeat domain is conserved amongst all members of the mannose receptor family. Collagens I-IV bind this region with high affinity, while collagen V binds only weakly. Through this domain, the mannose receptor internalises collagen in macrophages and liver sinusoidal cells, independent of the lectin activity of the receptor. Along with the N-terminal cysteine-rich domain, this domain is the most highly conserved between mice and humans (92%).

=== C-type carbohydrate recognition domains (CRDS) ===
The 8 tandem CRDs in the extracellular region of the mannose receptor share only 30% homology with each other. They each contain at least some of the amino acid residues necessary for Ca^{2+} and ligand binding, common to functional C-type CRDs. Only CRDs 4 and 5 contain all of the residues required for sugar binding, forming a protease-resistant ligand-binding core. The most common ligand is terminal mannose residues, but N-acetylglucosamine and fucose also bind.

The main interaction between CRD-4 and its sugar ligand is through direct ligation to the conserved Ca^{2+} in the sugar-binding site, in a similar way to the binding mechanism of mannan-binding lectin (MBL). However, a quarter of the free energy of sugar-binding is associated with the hydrophobic stacking interactions formed between one face of the sugar ring and the side chain of a conserved tyrosine residue in the binding site, which is not seen in MBL. Despite the similarities in mannose-binding between the mannose receptor and MBL, these differences suggest that mannose-binding by the mannose receptor evolved separately to that of other C-type lectins.

Individually, the CRDs bind mannose with only weak affinity. High affinity binding is thought to result from the clustering of multiple CRDs. This clustering allows for binding of multivalent, branched ligands such as high-mannose N-linked oligosaccharides.

=== Conformation ===
It has been suggested that the mannose receptor can exist in at least two different structural conformations. The C-type CRDs are each separated by linker regions of 10-20 amino acids containing a number of proline residues, whose cyclic side chain is fairly rigid and favours a conformation in which the N-terminal cysteine-rich domain is extended as far away from the plasma membrane as possible.

Alternatively, interactions between neighbouring CRDs may hold them in close proximity to one another and cause the extracellular region of the receptor to bend, bringing the N-terminal cysteine-rich domain into close contact with the CRDs. This would position CRDs 4 and 5 furthest from the membrane to maximise their interaction with potential ligands. The resistance to proteolysis shown by CRDs 4 and 5 suggests physical interactions between the two domains does occur, thereby supporting the existence of this U-shaped conformation.

It is thought that transitions between these two conformations occur in a pH-dependent manner, regulating ligand selectivity and release during endocytosis. The lower, more acidic pH of early endosomes is thought to be responsible for ligand release.

=== Proteolytic processing ===
A functional, soluble form of the mannose receptor is produced upon proteolytic cleavage of the membrane-bound form by metalloproteases found in the extracellular environment.

The soluble protein consists of the entire extracellular region of the receptor and it may be involved in transport of mannosylated proteins away from sites of inflammation. Shedding of the mannose receptor from macrophages has been shown to be enhanced upon recognition of fungal pathogens such as Candida albicans and Aspergillus fumigatus, which suggests the soluble form may play a role in fungal pathogen recognition. In this way, the balance between membrane-bound and soluble mannose receptor could affect targeting of fungal pathogens during the course of infection.

=== Glycosylation ===
The mannose receptor is heavily glycosylated and its N-linked glycosylation sites are highly conserved between mice and humans, indicating an important role for this post-translational modification. The presence of sialic acid residues on N-linked glycans of the mannose receptor is important for its role in binding both sulphated and mannosylated glycoproteins. Sialylation regulates multimerisation of the receptor, which is known to influence binding to sulphated glycoproteins. Terminal sialic acid residues are also known to be required for binding to mannosylated glycans. The absence of sialic acid reduces the receptors ability to bind and internalise mannosylated glycans, but does not affect its localisation to the plasma membrane or its endocytic activity.

== Function ==
=== Phagocytosis of pathogens ===
A number of pathogenic microorganisms, including C. albicans, Pneumocystis carinii and Leishmania donovani display glycans on their surfaces with terminal mannose residues that are recognised by the C-type CRDs of the mannose receptor, thereby acting as a marker of non-self. Upon recognition, the receptor internalises the bound pathogen and transports it to lysosomes for degradation via the phagocytic pathway. In this way, the mannose receptor acts as a pattern recognition receptor. The presence of a di-aromatic FENTLY (Phe-Glu-Asn-Thr-Leu-Tyr) sequence motif in the cytoplasmic tail of the receptor is vital for its clathrin-mediated internalization. This is supported by the evidence that Cos-1 cells transfected with the mannose receptor lacking its C-terminal tail are unable to endocytose C. albicans and P. carinii.

Surprisingly, mannose receptor knockout mice do not show increased susceptibility to infection, which suggests that the receptor is not essential for phagocytosis. However, its involvement cannot be rejected since other mechanisms may compensate. For example, infection of knockout mice with P. carinii resulted in increased recruitment of macrophages to the site of infection. Furthermore, other receptors present on the surface of phagocytic cells, such as DC-SIGN, SIGNR1 and Endo180, exhibit similar ligand binding ability to the mannose receptor and so it is likely that in its absence, these proteins are able to compensate and induce phagocytosis.

The ability of the mannose receptor to aid in pathogen internalisation is also thought to facilitate infection by Mycobacterium tuberculosis and Mycobacterium leprae. These bacteria reside and multiply in macrophages, preventing formation of the phagolysosome to avoid degradation. Hence, by mediating their entrance into the macrophage, blocking the mannose receptor helps these pathogens to infect and grow in their target cell.

=== Clathrin-mediated endocytosis ===
The CRD regions of the mannose receptor on liver sinusoidal endothelial cells remove a number of waste material ranging from soluble macromolecules to large particulate matter. These include lysosomal enzymes, collagen α-chains, C-terminal propeptides of type I pro-collagens, and tissue plasminogen activator. Binding studies indicate that each liver sinusoidal endothelial cell expresses a surface pool of 20,000-25,000 mannose receptors. The mannose receptor on liver sinusoidal endothelial cell is a rapidly recycling receptor, with a Ke (endocytotic rate constant) of 4.12 min-1, which corresponds to a half-life of 10 s for the surface pool of receptor-ligand complexes.

As opposed to macrophages that use the mannose receptors for phagocytosis of particulate matter >200 nm, the mannose receptor on liver sinusoidal endothelial cells mediates clathrin-mediated endocytosis of macromolecules and nanoparticles <200 nm.

=== Antigen presentation ===
The mannose receptor may also play a role in antigen uptake and presentation by immature dendritic cells in the adaptive immune system. Upon binding to the receptor, mannosylated antigens are internalised and transported to endocytic compartments within the cell for loading onto major histocompatibility complex (MHC) molecules or other related antigen-presentation molecules. An indirect example of this is the processing of the glycolipid antigen lipoarabinomannan, derived from Mycobacteria. Lipoarabinomannan (LAM) is presented to T cells in complex with CD1b, but is also able to bind to the mannose receptor. Since the presence of mannan, an alternative ligand, inhibits LAM-dependent T cell proliferation, it is suggested that the receptor binds extracellular LAM, internalises it and then transports it to endocytic vesicles to be loaded onto CD1b.

Mature dendritic cells and macrophages use the mannose receptor for antigen presentation in a different way. The cleaved, soluble receptor binds to circulating antigens and directs them to effector cells in lymphoid organs via its cysteine-rich domain, thus activating the adaptive immune system.

=== Intracellular signalling ===
The cytoplasmic tail of the mannose receptor does not contain any signalling motifs, yet the receptor has proven to be essential for production of both pro- and anti-inflammatory cytokines, indicating a more passive role for the receptor in phagocytosis of pathogens. This suggests that the mannose receptor is assisted by other cell surface receptors in order to trigger a signalling cascade. For example, it has been shown that HEK 293 cells co-transfected with human mannose receptor and human Toll-like receptor 2 cDNA are able to secrete IL-8 in response to P. carinii infection, whereas those transfected with either receptor alone did not. It is possible that the two receptors form a complex on the cell surface that facilitates signal transduction upon pathogenic challenge.

=== Resolution of inflammation ===
Another key role of the mannose receptor is to regulate the levels of molecules released into the circulation during the inflammatory response. In response to pathological events, glycoproteins including lysosomal hydrolases, tissue plasminogen activator and neutrophil myeloperoxidase are released to help fight off any invading microorganisms. Once the threat has subsided, these glycoproteins can be damaging to host tissues so their levels in the circulation must be strictly controlled.

High-mannose oligosaccharides present on the surface of these glycoproteins act to mark their transient nature, since they are eventually recognised by the mannose receptor and removed from the circulation. Mannose receptor knockout mice are less able to clear these proteins, and show increased concentrations of a number of lysosomal hydrolases in the blood.

Consistent with this function, the mannose receptor is expressed at low levels during inflammation and at high levels during the resolution of inflammation, to ensure inflammatory agents are removed from the circulation only at the appropriate time.

=== Clearance of glycoprotein hormones ===
The N-terminal cysteine-rich domain of the mannose receptor plays an important role in the recognition of sulphated glycoprotein hormones and their clearance from the circulation.

Glycoprotein hormones such as lutropin, which triggers release of the egg during ovulation, must stimulate their receptors in pulses to avoid receptor desensitisation. Glycans on their surface are capped with sulphated N-Acetylgalactosamine (GalNAc), making them ligands for the cysteine-rich ricin homology domain of the mannose receptor. This tag ensures a cycle of release, stimulation, and removal from the circulation.

Knockout mice lacking the enzyme required to add the sulphated GalNAc capping structure show longer half-lives for lutropin, which results in increased receptor activation and oestrogen production. Female knockout mice reach sexual maturity faster than their wild-type counterparts, have a longer oestrus cycle and produce more litters. Thus, the sulphated GalNAc tag is very important in regulating serum concentrations of certain glycoprotein hormones.

== Types ==
Humans express two types of mannose receptors, each encoded by its own gene:

Gene	Protein	Alternative names
MRC1	Macrophage mannose receptor 1	C-type mannose receptor 1, C-type lectin domain family 13 member D (CLEC13D), CD206, MMR
MRC2	Macrophage mannose receptor 2	C-type mannose receptor 2, Urokinase-type plasminogen activator receptor-associated protein, CD280

== Applications in health and disease ==
The selective internalisation properties of the mannose receptor indicate a number of potential applications in health and disease. By manipulating the glycosylation of important bioactive proteins to a highly mannosylated state, their serum levels could be tightly regulated and they could be targeted specifically to cells expressing the mannose receptor. There is also potential for use of the mannose receptor as a target for improved macrophage activation and antigen presentation.

MRC2/Endo180 interacts with Basigin/CD147 via its fourth C-type lectin domain to form a molecular epithelial-mesenchymal transition suppressor complex that if disrupted results in the induction of invasive prostate epithelial cell behavior associated with poor prostate cancer survival. Increased basement membrane stiffness due to its glycation can also trigger Endo180-dependent invasion of prostate epithelial cells and this bio-mechanical mechanism is associated with poor prostate cancer survival. It has been suggested that stabilization of the Endo180-CD147 epithelial-mesenchymal transition suppressor complex and targeting of the non-complexed form of Endo180 in invasive cells could have therapeutic benefit in the prevention of cancer progression and metastasis.
