= CD248 =

Protein-coding gene in humans

Identifiers
- Aliases: CD248, CD164L1, TEM1, CD248 molecule
- External IDs: OMIM: 606064; MGI: 1917695; GeneCards: CD248

Gene location (Human)
Chr.	Chromosome 11 (human)
Band	11q13.2	Start	66,314,494 bp
Band	11q13.2	End	66,317,044 bp

Gene location (Mouse)
Chr.	Chromosome 19 (mouse)
Band	19|19 A	Start	5,118,106 bp
Band	19|19 A	End	5,120,710 bp
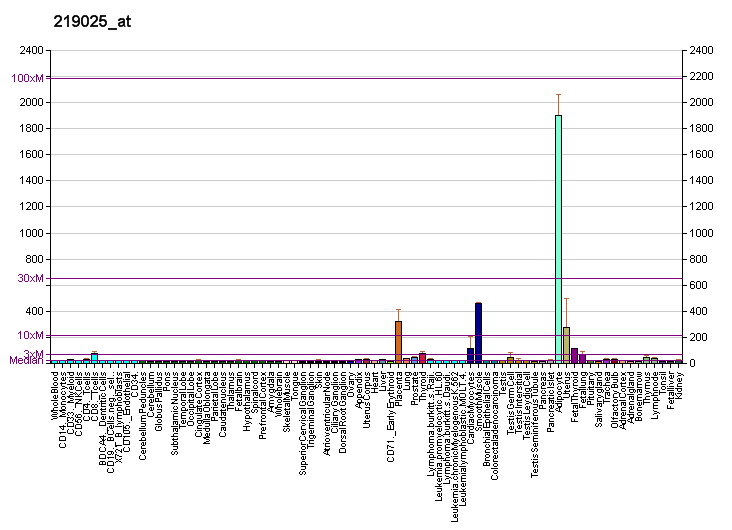
RNA expression pattern
Bgee	Human / Mouse (ortholog); Top expressed in: decidua; stromal cell of endometrium; subcutaneous adipose tissue; gastric mucosa; synovial joint; pericardium; canal of the cervix; left uterine tube; ectocervix; skin of hip / Top expressed in: external carotid artery; internal carotid artery; molar; lip; occiput; occipital bone; ankle; efferent ductule; sciatic nerve; dermis; More reference expression data
BioGPS	More reference expression data
Gene ontology
Molecular function	calcium ion binding; extracellular matrix binding; carbohydrate binding; molecular function; extracellular matrix protein binding
Cellular component	cytoplasm; integral component of membrane; extracellular exosome; membrane; extracellular matrix; external side of plasma membrane
Biological process	positive regulation of endothelial cell apoptotic process; lymph node development; cell migration; positive regulation of cell population proliferation; anatomical structure regression; biological process
Sources:Amigo / QuickGO
Orthologs
Databases	NCBI: entry; OMA: entry
Species	Human	Mouse
Entrez	57124	70445
Ensembl	ENSG00000174807	ENSMUSG00000056481
UniProt	Q9HCU0	Q91V98
RefSeq (mRNA)	NM_020404	NM_054042
RefSeq (protein)	NP_065137	NP_473383
Location (UCSC)	Chr 11: 66.31 – 66.32 Mb	Chr 19: 5.12 – 5.12 Mb
PubMed search
- Wikidata
View/Edit Human	View/Edit Mouse

Endosialin is a protein that in humans is encoded by the CD248 gene.

Endosialin is a member of the “Group XIV”, a novel family of C-type lectin transmembrane receptors which play a role not only in cell–cell adhesion processes but also in host defence. This family comprise three other members, CLEC14A, CD93 and Thrombomodulin the latter of which are better characterized.

The function of endosialin remains elusive, but its expression has been associated with angiogenesis in the embryo and uterus and in tumor development and growth.

== See also ==
- Cluster of differentiation
