= MEDI6570 =

Experimental drug

MEDI6570 is an antibody of the lectin-like oxidized low-density lipoprotein receptor-1 (LOX-1) that is being tested in people with type 2 diabetes to see if it reduces their risk of cardiovascular disease. The drug is developed by AstraZeneca.
