= RHTM =

RHTM may refer to:

- The Regional Highway Traffic Model a multimillion-pound system developed by the UK's Department of Transport in the 1970s
- Retail, hospitality, and tourism management, a subject offered at degree level by University of Tennessee (Knoxville)
- Recombinant human thrombomodulin (rhTM)
