= CD93 =

Protein in humans

Identifiers
- Aliases: CD93, C1QR1, C1qR(P), C1qRP, CDw93, ECSM3, MXRA4, dJ737E23.1, CD93 molecule
- External IDs: OMIM: 120577; MGI: 106664; GeneCards: CD93

Gene location (Human)
Chr.	Chromosome 20 (human)
Band	20p11.21	Start	23,079,360 bp
Band	20p11.21	End	23,086,324 bp

Gene location (Mouse)
Chr.	Chromosome 2 (mouse)
Band	2 G3|2 73.48 cM	Start	148,278,560 bp
Band	2 G3|2 73.48 cM	End	148,285,483 bp
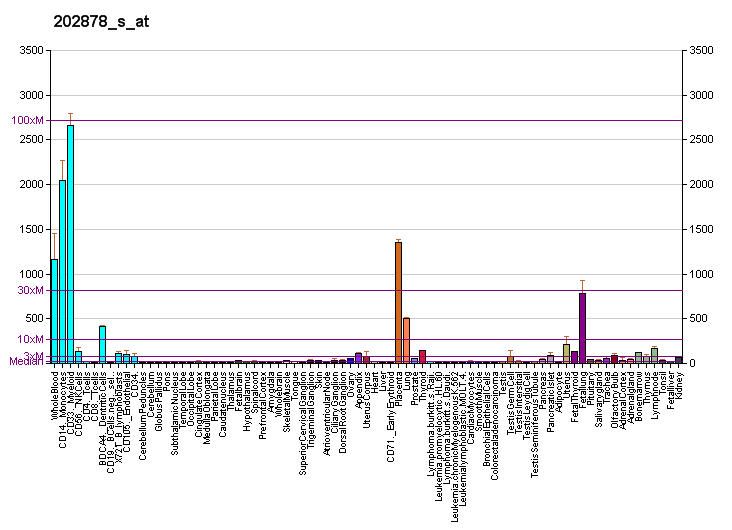

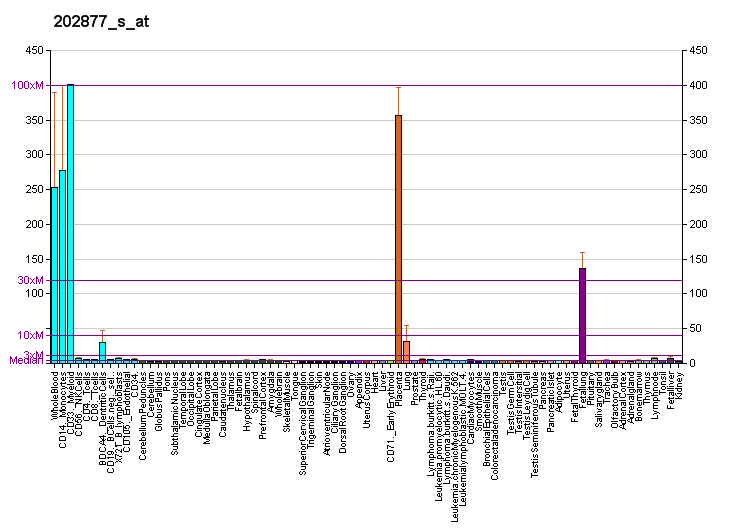
RNA expression pattern
Bgee	Human / Mouse (ortholog); Top expressed in: visceral pleura; lower lobe of lung; parietal pleura; monocyte; periodontal fiber; placenta; pericardium; vena cava; trabecular bone; superficial temporal artery / Top expressed in: left lung; left lung lobe; right lung; right lung lobe; stroma of bone marrow; atrioventricular valve; external carotid artery; atrium; internal carotid artery; body of femur; More reference expression data
BioGPS	More reference expression data
Gene ontology
Molecular function	calcium ion binding; complement component C1q complex binding; protein binding; carbohydrate binding; signaling receptor activity
Cellular component	cell surface; membrane; plasma membrane; secretory granule membrane; cytoplasmic vesicle; specific granule membrane; tertiary granule membrane; ficolin-1-rich granule membrane; integral component of membrane
Biological process	phagocytosis; macrophage activation; cell adhesion; viral process; neutrophil degranulation; cell-cell adhesion; signal transduction
Sources:Amigo / QuickGO
Orthologs
Databases	NCBI: entry; OMA: entry
Species	Human	Mouse
Entrez	22918	17064
Ensembl	ENSG00000125810	ENSMUSG00000027435
UniProt	Q9NPY3	O89103
RefSeq (mRNA)	NM_012072	NM_010740
RefSeq (protein)	NP_036204	NP_034870
Location (UCSC)	Chr 20: 23.08 – 23.09 Mb	Chr 2: 148.28 – 148.29 Mb
PubMed search
- Wikidata
View/Edit Human	View/Edit Mouse

CD93 (Cluster of Differentiation 93) is a protein that in humans is encoded by the CD93 gene. CD93 is a C-type lectin transmembrane receptor which plays a role not only in cell–cell adhesion processes but also in host defense.

== Family ==
CD93 belongs to the Group XIV C-Type lectin family, a group containing three other members, endosialin (CD248), CLEC14A and thrombomodulin, a well characterized anticoagulant. All of them contain a C-type lectin domain, a series of epidermal growth factor like domains, a highly glycosylated mucin-like domain, a unique transmembrane domain and a short cytoplasmic tail. Due to their strong homology and their close proximity on chromosome 20, CD93 has been suggested to have arisen from the thrombomodulin gene through a duplication event.

== Expression ==
CD93 was originally identified in mice as an early B cell marker through the use of AA4.1 monoclonal antibody. Then this molecule was shown to be expressed on an early population of hematopoietic stem cells, which give rise to the entire spectrum of mature cells in the blood. Now CD93 is known to be expressed by a wide variety of cells such as platelets, monocytes, microglia and endothelial cells. In the immune system CD93 is also expressed on neutrophils, activated macrophages, B cell precursors until the T2 stage in the spleen, a subset of dendritic cells and of natural killer cells. Molecular characterization of CD93 revealed that this protein is identical with C1qRp, a human protein identified as a putative C1q receptor. C1q belongs to the complement activation proteins and plays a major role in the activation of the classical pathway of the complement, which leads to the formation of the membrane attack complex. C1q is also involved in other immunological processes such as enhancement of bacterial phagocytosis, clearance of apoptotic cells or neutralisation of virus. Strikingly, it has been shown that anti-C1qRp significantly reduced C1q enhanced phagocytosis. A more recent study confirmed that C1qRp is identical to CD93 protein, but failed to demonstrate a direct interaction between CD93 and C1q under physiological conditions. Recently it has been shown that CD93 is re-expressed during the late B cell differentiation and CD93 can be used in this context as a plasma cell maturation marker. CD93 has been found to be differentially expressed in grade IV glioma vasculature when compared to low grade glioma or normal brain and its high expression correlated with the poor survival of the patients.

== Function ==
CD93 was initially thought to be a receptor for C1q, but now is thought to instead be involved in intercellular adhesion and in the clearance of apoptotic cells. The intracellular cytoplasmic tail of this protein contains two highly conserved domains which may be involved in CD93 function. Indeed, the highly charged juxtamembrane domain has been found to interact with moesin, a protein known to play a role in linking transmembrane proteins to the cytoskeleton and in the remodelling of the cytoskeleton. This process appears crucial for both adhesion, migration and phagocytosis, three functions in which CD93 may be involved.

In the context of late B cell differentiation, CD93 has been shown to be important for the maintenance of high antibody titres after immunization and in the survival of long-lived plasma cells in the bone marrow. Indeed, CD93 deficient mice failed to maintain high antibody level upon immunization and present a lower amount of antigen specific plasma cells in the bone marrow.

In the context of the endothelial cells, CD93 is involved in endothelial cell-cell adhesion, cell spreading, cell migration, cell polarization as well as tubular morphogenesis. Recently it has been found that CD93 is able to control endothelial cell dynamics through its interaction with an extracellular matrix glycoprotein MMRN2. Absence of CD93 or its interacting partner MMRN2 in the endothelial cells lead to disruption of extracellular matrix protein fibronectin fibrillogenesis and decreased integrin B1 activation.

CD93 plays a significant role in the glioma development. CD93 knockout mice with glioma show smaller tumor size and improved survival. The tumors also show disrupted fibronectin fibrillogenesis and decreased integrin B1 activation.

== See also ==
- Cluster of differentiation
- C-type lectin
