= CD302 =

Protein-coding gene in humans

Identifiers
- Aliases: CD302, BIMLEC, CLEC13A, DCL-1, DCL1, CD302 molecule
- External IDs: OMIM: 612246; MGI: 1913455; GeneCards: CD302

Gene location (Human)
Chr.	Chromosome 2 (human)
Band	2q24.2	Start	159,768,628 bp
Band	2q24.2	End	159,798,255 bp

Gene location (Mouse)
Chr.	Chromosome 2 (mouse)
Band	2|2 C1.1	Start	60,082,337 bp
Band	2|2 C1.1	End	60,114,832 bp
RNA expression pattern
Bgee	Human / Mouse (ortholog); Top expressed in: lower lobe of lung; monocyte; right lung; liver; synovial joint; trabecular bone; synovial membrane; right lobe of liver; Achilles tendon; superficial temporal artery / Top expressed in: left lobe of liver; white adipose tissue; calvaria; stroma of bone marrow; right kidney; tunica adventitia of aorta; right lung lobe; mesenteric lymph nodes; carotid body; skin of external ear; More reference expression data
BioGPS	n/a
Gene ontology
Molecular function	carbohydrate binding; transmembrane signaling receptor activity
Cellular component	filopodium; cytoplasm; integral component of membrane; microvillus; cell projection; cell cortex; membrane; integral component of plasma membrane
Biological process	phagocytosis; signal transduction
Sources:Amigo / QuickGO
Orthologs
Databases	NCBI: entry; OMA: entry
Species	Human	Mouse
Entrez	9936	66205
Ensembl	ENSG00000241399	ENSMUSG00000060703
UniProt	Q8IX05	Q9DCG2
RefSeq (mRNA)	NM_014880; NM_001198763; NM_001198764	NM_001290660; NM_025422
RefSeq (protein)	NP_001185692; NP_001185693; NP_055695	NP_001277589; NP_079698
Location (UCSC)	Chr 2: 159.77 – 159.8 Mb	Chr 2: 60.08 – 60.11 Mb
PubMed search
- Wikidata
View/Edit Human	View/Edit Mouse

The CD302 antigen also known as C-type lectin domain family 13 member A is a protein that in humans is encoded by the CD302 gene.

== Function ==
CD302 is a C-type lectin receptor involved in cell adhesion and migration, as well as endocytosis and phagocytosis.
