= CHODL =

Protein-coding gene in humans

Identifiers
- Aliases: CHODL, C21orf68, MT75, PRED12, chondrolectin
- External IDs: OMIM: 607247; MGI: 2179069; GeneCards: CHODL

Gene location (Human)
Chr.	Chromosome 21 (human)
Band	21q21.1	Start	17,901,263 bp
Band	21q21.1	End	18,267,373 bp

Gene location (Mouse)
Chr.	Chromosome 16 (mouse)
Band	16|16 C3.1	Start	78,727,836 bp
Band	16|16 C3.1	End	78,748,621 bp
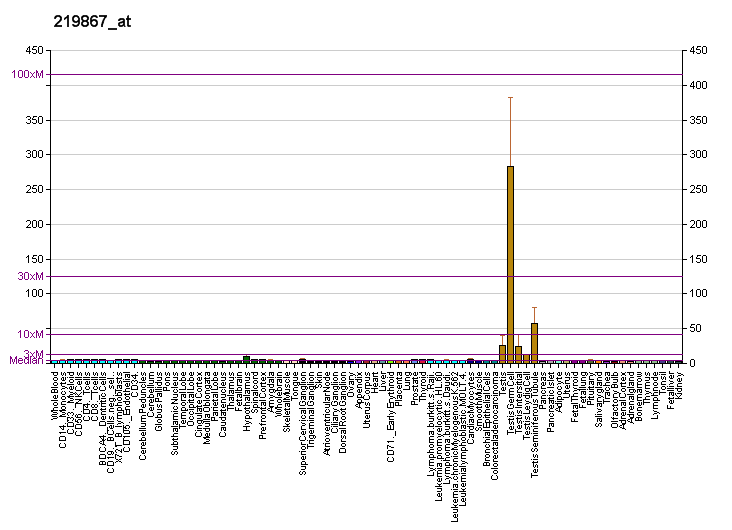
RNA expression pattern
Bgee	Human / Mouse (ortholog); Top expressed in: Achilles tendon; right testis; left testis; gonad; epithelium of colon; spleen; hypothalamus; rectum; inferior olivary nucleus; ganglionic eminence / Top expressed in: facial motor nucleus; vas deferens; lumbar subsegment of spinal cord; motor neuron; body of femur; anterior horn of spinal cord; superior cervical ganglion; soleus muscle; intercostal muscle; efferent ductule; More reference expression data
BioGPS	More reference expression data
Gene ontology
Molecular function	hyaluronic acid binding; carbohydrate binding
Cellular component	cytoplasm; perinuclear region of cytoplasm; integral component of membrane; membrane; endoplasmic reticulum; endoplasmic reticulum membrane
Biological process	muscle organ development; regulation of neuron projection development; nervous system development; positive regulation of axonogenesis
Sources:Amigo / QuickGO
Orthologs
Databases	NCBI: entry; OMA: entry
Species	Human	Mouse
Entrez	140578	246048
Ensembl	ENSG00000154645	ENSMUSG00000022860
UniProt	Q9H9P2	Q9CXM0
RefSeq (mRNA)	NM_001204174; NM_001204175; NM_001204176; NM_001204177; NM_001204178 NM_024944	NM_139134; NM_001362555
RefSeq (protein)	NP_001191103; NP_001191104; NP_001191105; NP_001191106; NP_001191107 NP_079220	NP_624360; NP_001349484
Location (UCSC)	Chr 21: 17.9 – 18.27 Mb	Chr 16: 78.73 – 78.75 Mb
PubMed search
- Wikidata
View/Edit Human	View/Edit Mouse

Chondrolectin is a protein that in humans is encoded by the CHODL gene. Mouse chondrolectin is encoded by Chodl.

== Structure ==
Chondrolectin is a type I membrane protein with a carbohydrate recognition domain characteristic of C-type lectins in its extracellular portion. In other proteins, this domain is involved in endocytosis of glycoproteins and exogenous sugar-bearing pathogens. This protein has been shown to localise to the perinucleus.

== Function ==
The exact function of chondrolectin is unknown but it has been shown to be a marker of fast motor neurons in mice, and is involved in motor neuron development and growth in zebrafish (Danio rerio). Furthermore, human chondrolectin has been shown to localise to motor neurons within the spinal cord.

== Clinical significance ==
Chondrolectin is alternatively spliced in the spinal cord of mouse models of the neuromuscular disease, spinal muscular atrophy (SMA), which predominantly affects lower motor neurons. Increased levels of chondrolectin in a zebrafish model of SMA results in significant improvements in disease-related motor neuron defects.
