= CLEC6A =

Protein-coding gene in humans

Identifiers
- Aliases: CLEC6A, CLEC4N, CLECSF10, C-type lectin domain family 6 member A, dectin-2, C-type lectin domain containing 6A, hDECTIN-2
- External IDs: OMIM: 613579; MGI: 1861231; HomoloGene: 84615; GeneCards: CLEC6A; OMA:CLEC6A - orthologs

Gene location (Human)
Chr.	Chromosome 12 (human)
Band	12p13.31	Start	8,455,962 bp
Band	12p13.31	End	8,478,330 bp

Gene location (Mouse)
Chr.	Chromosome 6 (mouse)
Band	6 F2|6 58.3 cM	Start	123,206,802 bp
Band	6 F2|6 58.3 cM	End	123,223,980 bp
RNA expression pattern
Bgee	Human / Mouse (ortholog); Top expressed in: testicle; monocyte; appendix; granulocyte; blood; lymph node; gonad; smooth muscle tissue; gallbladder; endometrium / Top expressed in: stroma of bone marrow; spleen; calvaria; mesenteric lymph nodes; right lung lobe; granulocyte; thymus; carotid body; spermatid; jejunum; More reference expression data
BioGPS	n/a
Gene ontology
Molecular function	carbohydrate binding; calcium ion binding; mannose binding; metal ion binding
Cellular component	integral component of membrane; plasma membrane; membrane
Biological process	positive regulation of I-kappaB kinase/NF-kappaB signaling; stimulatory C-type lectin receptor signaling pathway; adaptive immune response; defense response to fungus; immune system process; innate immune response
Sources:Amigo / QuickGO
Orthologs
Species	Human	Mouse
Entrez	93978	56620
Ensembl	ENSG00000205846	ENSMUSG00000023349
UniProt	Q6EIG7	Q9JKF4
RefSeq (mRNA)	NM_001007033; NM_001317999	NM_001190320; NM_001190321; NM_020001
RefSeq (protein)	NP_001007034; NP_001304928	NP_001177249; NP_001177250; NP_064385
Location (UCSC)	Chr 12: 8.46 – 8.48 Mb	Chr 6: 123.21 – 123.22 Mb
PubMed search
- Wikidata
View/Edit Human	View/Edit Mouse

Dectin-2 or C-type lectin domain containing 6A is a protein that in humans is encoded by the CLEC6A gene. Dectin-2 is a member of the C-type lectin/C-type lectin-like domain (CTL/CTLD) superfamily. The encoded protein is a type II transmembrane protein with an extracellular carbohydrate recognition domain. It functions as a pattern recognition receptor recognizing α-mannans and as such plays an important role in innate immune response to fungi. Expression is found on macrophages and dendritic cells. It can also be found at low levels in Langerhans cells and peripheral blood monocytes, where expression levels could be increased upon induction of inflammation.

Dectin-2 genes are located in the telomeric region of the natural killer gene cluster on mouse chromosome 6 and human chromosome 12. The dectin-2 cluster is composed of genes encoding dectin-2, DCIR, DCAR, BDCA-2, Mincle and Clecsf8, which are the members of the group II C-type lectin family.

== Structure ==
Dectin-2 is a glycosylated type II transmembrane protein which is encoded by six exons. It consists of a single C-type lectin (carbohydrate recognition domain, CRD) domain in its extracellular region, a stalk region, a transmembrane region and a cytoplasmic domain. Its CRD domain contains a glutamic acid-proline-asparagine (EPN) motif, which is Ca^{2+} dependent. The cytoplasmic domain is generally short. Unlike dectin-1, it has no known signaling motif in its cytoplasmic region. Instead, upon ligand binding, dectin-2 transduces signal via association with the ITAM-containing Fc receptor γ chain.

== Signaling ==
Dectin-2 is a member of C-type lectin receptor family, which is a group of pattern recognition receptors involved in antifungal immunity, homeostasis and induction of immune response to pathogens. Its carbohydrate recognition domain is capable of binding α-mannans in fungal cell walls. Upon ligand binding, dectin-2 transduces the signal via an ITAM-bearing adaptor protein FcγR. This results in recruitment of Syk and downstream activation of so-called CBM (CARD9-BCL10-MALT1) signalling complex, leading to NFκB activation and resulting in production of cytokines, including IL-6, IL-23 and IL-1β.

Aforementioned signaling pathway leads to induction of phagocytosis and production of inflammatory mediators, such as cytokines and chemokines, induction of both innate and adaptive immunity and overall antimicrobial response.

Signaling induced by dectin-2 activation also augments IL-17RC expression in neutrophils, and is involved in IL-17A and IL-17RC autocrine feedback loop, which is important for ROS production and subsequent elimination of fungal pathogen.

Dectin-2 has also been reported to be involved in activation of MAPK signaling.

E3 ubiquitin ligase CBLB has been described as negative regulator of dectin-2.

=== Ligands ===
Dectin-2 is known to recognize α-mannans, which are an important component of fungal cell wall. It has also been reported to recognize glycoproteins rich in O-mannobiose residues.

== Functions ==
=== Anti-fungal immunity ===
Dectin-2 signaling is an essential component of host defense against fungal infections. It has been observed that dectin-2 preferentially induces the Th17 response, which is essential for effective host protection and elimination of fungal pathogens. Cytokines produced after dectin-2 activation include IL-6, IL-23 and IL-1β, all of which are typical for Th17 response. Dectin-2 can also induce production of IL-12, which stimulates Th1 lymphocytes to produce IFN-γ. This in turn leads to activation of macrophages and contributes to fungal eradication.

Anti-inflammatory cytokines such as IL-2 and IL-10 can also be induced by dectin-2.

Most abundantly studied is the role of dectin-2 in Candida albicans infections, and it has been observed that this receptor is important for effective host defense and C. albicans clearance. Mice lacking dectin-2 demonstrated greatly increased susceptibility to C. albicans infections, supporting that this receptor is essential for the induction of effective immune response. The functions of dectin-2 appear to differ between the yeast and hyphal forms of C. albicans. Possibly due to different cell wall ligands, as these two forms are known to slightly differ in terms of cell wall organization. Dectin-2 could possibly be able to distinguish between the two morphological forms of C. albicans.

Dectin-2 has also been shown to interact with Dectin-3, witch which it can form a heterodimer in order to mediate the immune defense against Candida albicans.

While Dectin-2 is known to mediate immune response to Candida albicans, it recognizes a variety of different pathogens, which include Candida glabrata, Cryptococcus neoformans, Aspergillus fumigatus, Saccharomyces cerevisiae, Mycobacterium tuberculosis, Paracoccidioides brasiliensis and Histoplasma capsulatum among other species.

=== Other functions ===
Dectin-2 has also been linked to allergic responses. It is reportedly able to recognize the house dust mite (arachnids known to cause allergy), and subsequently induce cysteinyl leukotriene production. These mediators, along with cytokines such as IL-33, are essential for the initiation of airway inflammation and for induction of Th2 response.
