= Attractin =

Protein-coding gene in the species Homo sapiens

ATRN

Identifiers
- Aliases: ATRN, DPPT-L, MGCA, attractin
- External IDs: OMIM: 603130; MGI: 1341628; HomoloGene: 22542; GeneCards: ATRN; OMA:ATRN - orthologs

Gene location (Human)
Chr.	Chromosome 20 (human)
Band	20p13	Start	3,471,018 bp
Band	20p13	End	3,651,118 bp

Gene location (Mouse)
Chr.	Chromosome 2 (mouse)
Band	2 F1|2 63.26 cM	Start	130,748,415 bp
Band	2 F1|2 63.26 cM	End	130,872,253 bp
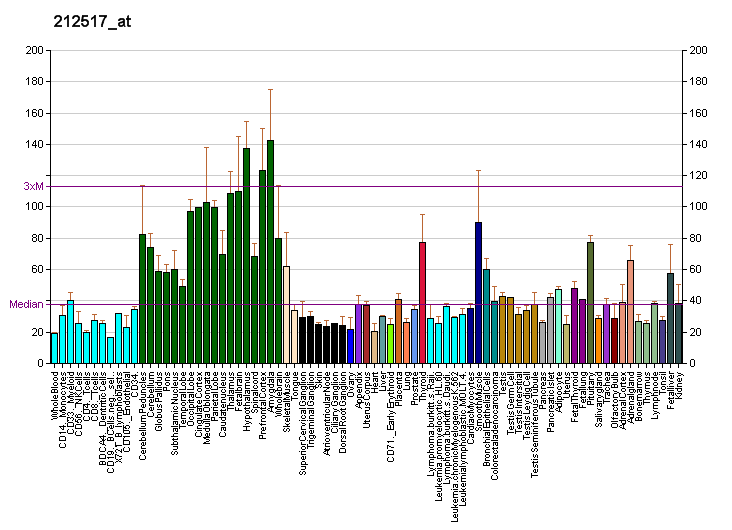

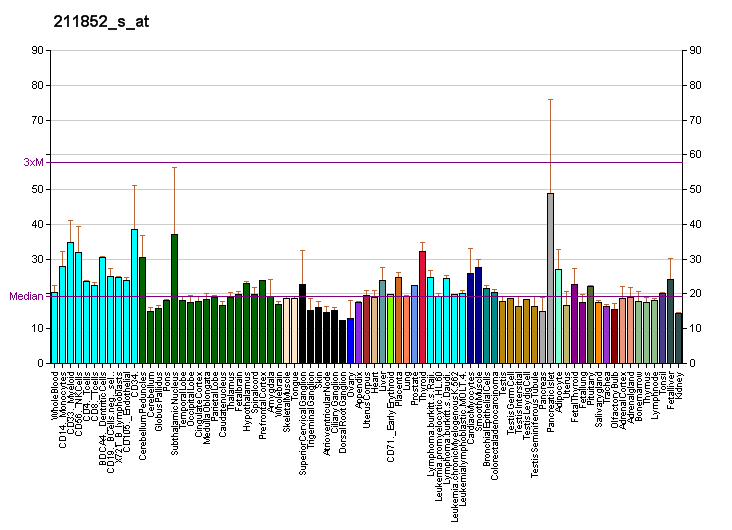
RNA expression pattern
Bgee	Human / Mouse (ortholog); Top expressed in: duodenum; lateral nuclear group of thalamus; stromal cell of endometrium; orbitofrontal cortex; jejunal mucosa; subthalamic nucleus; islet of Langerhans; superior vestibular nucleus; external globus pallidus; pons / Top expressed in: transitional epithelium of urinary bladder; primary motor cortex; subdivision of hippocampus; Region I of hippocampus proper; piriform cortex; dentate gyrus; olfactory tubercle; globus pallidus; dentate gyrus of hippocampal formation granule cell; cingulate gyrus; More reference expression data
BioGPS	More reference expression data
Gene ontology
Molecular function	carbohydrate binding; signaling receptor activity
Cellular component	cytoplasm; integral component of membrane; extracellular region; plasma membrane; integral component of plasma membrane; extracellular exosome; membrane; extracellular space
Biological process	myelination; pigmentation; inflammatory response; response to oxidative stress; cerebellum development; regulation of multicellular organism growth; animal organ morphogenesis; tissue development
Sources:Amigo / QuickGO
Orthologs
Species	Human	Mouse
Entrez	8455	11990
Ensembl	ENSG00000088812	ENSMUSG00000027312
UniProt	O75882	Q9WU60
RefSeq (mRNA)	NM_001207047; NM_012070; NM_139321; NM_139322; NM_001323332	NM_009730
RefSeq (protein)	NP_001193976; NP_001310261; NP_647537; NP_647538	NP_033860
Location (UCSC)	Chr 20: 3.47 – 3.65 Mb	Chr 2: 130.75 – 130.87 Mb
PubMed search
- Wikidata
View/Edit Human	View/Edit Mouse

Attractin is a protein that in humans is encoded by the ATRN gene.

Attractin is a Group XI C-type lectin.

Multiple transcript variants encoding different isoforms exist for this gene. One of the isoforms is a membrane-bound protein with sequence similarity to the mouse mahogany protein, a receptor involved in controlling obesity. The other isoform is a secreted protein involved in the initial immune cell clustering during inflammatory responses that may regulate the chemotactic activity of chemokines.
