= Long-lived plasma cell =

White blood cell

Long-lived plasma cells (LLPCs) are a distinct subset of plasma cells that play a crucial role in maintaining humoral memory and long-term immunity. They continuously produce and secrete high-affinity antibodies into the bloodstream, conversely to memory B cells, which are quiescent and respond quickly to antigens upon recall.

Initially, it was believed that memory B cells replenish LLPCs. However, allergen-specific Immunoglobulin E (IgE) production through bone marrow transplantation in non-allergic individuals suggests LLPCs may be long-lived because the allergies developed without antigenic re-stimulation. That led to the understanding that LLPCs are long-lived cells that contribute to the sustained production of specific antibodies.

== Niche of LLPCs ==
The niche for long-lived plasma cells is a subject of ongoing research, and while some aspects are understood, many questions remain. LLPCs are not inherently long-lived, and their survival relies on accessing specific pro-survival niches in the bone marrow, secondary lymphoid organs, mucosal tissues, and sites of inflammation. The bone marrow has traditionally been considered the primary residence for LLPCs, offering a dynamic micro-environment that supports the formation of complex niches. However, recent studies have revealed that LLPCs can also reside in other locations, such as gut-associated lymphoid tissue (GALT), where they primarily produce IgA antibodies.

== Cell markers ==
Clear markers that distinguish LLPCs have yet to be fully identified. However, LLPCs exhibit a gene expression signature characterised by down-regulating antigen presentation and B-cell receptor (BCR) function-related genes. Conversely, only a tiny number of genes are up-regulated in LLPC, including anti-apoptotic genes such as MCL1 and ZNF667, ER stress-associated genes like ERO1LB and MANF, and the retention of TFBS and SRF in the bone marrow.

Furthermore, expression levels of surface markers, such as CD38 and CD19, vary among plasma cells and are associated with functional differences. These differences include the plasma cells producing either high-affinity or low-affinity antibodies.

Intrinsic and extrinsic factors contribute to the survival of LLPCs through various mechanisms. LLPCs rely on intrinsic signals for their long-term survival and function. Unique metabolic pathways, including autophagy and the unfolded protein response (UPR), are essential for LLPCs to cope with the high protein load and ER stress of continuous antibody production.

=== Intrinsic factors ===
- BCMA (B-cell maturation antigen): Up-regulation of anti-apoptotic genes prevents LLPCs from undergoing programmed cell death.
- STAT3 (Signal transducer and activator of transcription 3): LLPCs respond to interleukin 6 (IL-6), IL-10, and IL-21 signaling, which triggers downstream survival signaling associated with these cytokines.
- Aiolos: This factor promotes the generation of LLPCs that produce high-affinity antibodies.
- CD93: There may be a connection between CD93 and the regulation of BLIMP-1, a key transcription factor that influences the mature phenotype of LLPCs and their production of high-affinity antibodies.
- CD28: Signaling through the Vav/Grb2 motif can induce NF-κB signaling and expression of BLIMP-1. CD28 engagement with its ligands CD80/CD86 promotes signaling through dendritic cells and up-regulation of IL-6.
- Autophagy (Atg5): LLPCs utilise autophagy as a recycling mechanism to supply metabolic substrates and eliminate misfolded proteins.
- Metabolic profile: LLPCs take up glucose for antibody glycosylation. They can also switch to glycolysis and import pyruvate into mitochondria under non-optimal conditions.
- ENPP1: This enzyme regulates glucose homeostasis and the metabolic pathway in LLPCs.

=== Extrinsic factors ===
The LLPC niche consists of various extrinsic factors that support their survival and function.

- Stromal cells expressing CXCL12 are a homing signal for LLPCs expressing the CXCR4 receptor, facilitating their migration to specific niches.
- Megakaryocytes and basophils produce soluble factors like APRIL and BAFF, which contribute to the survival of LLPCs.
- LLPCs engage in interactions with dendritic cells, T follicular helper cells, and regulatory T cells through cell surface interactions and cytokines, further influencing their survival and function.

== LLPCs versus naive B cells ==
Morphologically, LLPCs exhibit distinct alterations, such as an expansion of rough endoplasmic reticulum, reflecting their specialised role in antibody production. Most mRNA synthesised by LLPCs is dedicated to immunoglobulins, indicating their primary function and the loss of other cellular abilities.

The following two tables show the significant properties between naive B cells and plasma cells.

B-cells
Name	Function
Surface Immunoglobulin (Ig)	Naive B cells express surface Ig, which serves as the B cell receptor for antigen recognition.
Surface MHC Class II	Naive B cells present antigens to helper T cells through surface major histocompatibility complex class II (MHC II) molecules, initiating T cell-dependent immune responses.
Inducible Growth	Naive B cells can be stimulated to proliferate and differentiate upon encountering an antigen and appropriate co-stimulatory signals.
Somatic Hypermutation	During the germinal centre reaction, naive B cells undergo somatic hypermutation, which introduces random mutations in the variable regions of their immunoglobulin genes. This process leads to generating B cells with increased affinity for the antigen.
Isotype Switch	Naive B cells can undergo isotype switching, a process that changes the constant region of the immunoglobulin molecule, allowing for the production of different antibody isotypes with distinct effector functions.

Plasma Cells
Name	Function
Intrinsic High-Rate Ig Secretion	Plasma cells are highly specialised antibody-secreting cells. They have a large and active endoplasmic reticulum, which enables them to produce and secrete a high volume of immunoglobulins.
Downregulated Surface MHC Class II	Plasma cells have significantly reduced surface expression of MHC Class II molecules. As a result, they have limited antigen presentation capability.
Limited Inducible Growth	Unlike naive B cells, plasma cells have limited proliferative capacity. Once they differentiate from B cells, they focus on antibody production rather than further expansion.
No Somatic Hypermutation	Plasma cells do not undergo somatic hypermutation. Instead, they represent the end product of the germinal centre reaction and are responsible for producing high-affinity antibodies generated by the mutated B cells.

== Memory versus plasma fate ==
Following an immune response, B cells undergo affinity maturation, which improves the strength of their antibodies' binding to a specific antigen. B cells, with higher affinity antibodies, are selected for survival and undergo further division and affinity maturation rounds in specialised structures called germinal centers. This process involves somatic hypermutation, resulting in genetic changes that enhance the antibody's affinity. B cells with higher affinity antibodies can take two paths:

1. Plasma Cells: These B cells differentiate into plasma cells, which migrate to survival niches, such as the bone marrow. Plasma cells continuously secrete antibodies throughout a person's lifetime.
2. Memory B Cells: These B cells can become memory B cells without differentiating into plasma cells. They retain their original antibody form (IgM+) and have fewer genetic mutations. Memory B cells either recirculate through the body or reside in specific tissues. They can quickly respond to secondary infections and can switch antibody classes.

Overall, plasma cells provide continuous antibody production, while memory B cells offer a reservoir of pre-existing B cells that can mount a rapid and effective immune response upon re-exposure to the antigen.

The immune system has two main lines of defense in providing long-lasting protection against a pathogen's reinfection: LLPCs and memory B cells. LLPCs produce protective antibodies, and memory B cells can respond to reinfection by pathogens and their variants. The first wall comprises LLPCs in the bone marrow. These plasma cells secrete particular antibodies that have been carefully selected to target the previously encountered pathogen's antigens. These antibodies form a barrier against reinfection with homologous pathogens. However, variant pathogens can find holes in this wall. Those pathogens then encounter the second wall, namely memory B cells, which were less highly selected and maintain a broader range of antigen affinities and specificities. The memory B cells are activated via the variant pathogen to differentiate into LLPCs or to reenter the germinal centers to replenish the memory B cell pool.
