= CLEC1A =

Protein-coding gene in humans

Identifiers
- Aliases: CLEC1A, CLEC-1, CLEC1, C-type lectin domain family 1 member A
- External IDs: OMIM: 606782; MGI: 2444151; HomoloGene: 9549; GeneCards: CLEC1A; OMA:CLEC1A - orthologs

Gene location (Human)
Chr.	Chromosome 12 (human)
Band	12p13.2	Start	10,069,554 bp
Band	12p13.2	End	10,111,627 bp

Gene location (Mouse)
Chr.	Chromosome 6 (mouse)
Band	6|6 F3	Start	129,401,735 bp
Band	6|6 F3	End	129,428,963 bp
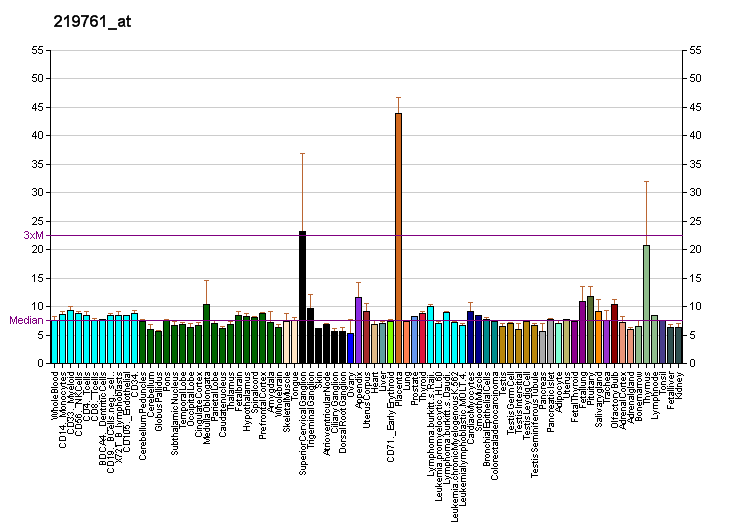
RNA expression pattern
Bgee	Human / Mouse (ortholog); Top expressed in: placenta; upper lobe of left lung; right lung; subcutaneous adipose tissue; testicle; tibial nerve; body of uterus; canal of the cervix; ectocervix; left uterine tube / Top expressed in: left lung lobe; right lung; lumbar spinal ganglion; right lung lobe; renal corpuscle; carotid body; mesenteric lymph nodes; sciatic nerve; atrioventricular valve; cumulus cell; More reference expression data
BioGPS	More reference expression data
Gene ontology
Molecular function	transmembrane signaling receptor activity; carbohydrate binding
Cellular component	integral component of membrane; integral component of plasma membrane; intracellular anatomical structure; membrane
Biological process	cell surface receptor signaling pathway; defense response
Sources:Amigo / QuickGO
Orthologs
Species	Human	Mouse
Entrez	51267	243653
Ensembl	ENSG00000150048	ENSMUSG00000033082
UniProt	Q8NC01	Q8BWY2
RefSeq (mRNA)	NM_001297748; NM_001297749; NM_001297750; NM_001297751; NM_016511	NM_175526; NM_001347475
RefSeq (protein)	NP_001284677; NP_001284678; NP_001284679; NP_001284680; NP_057595 NP_001284677.1	NP_001334404; NP_780735
Location (UCSC)	Chr 12: 10.07 – 10.11 Mb	Chr 6: 129.4 – 129.43 Mb
PubMed search
- Wikidata
View/Edit Human	View/Edit Mouse

C-type lectin domain family 1 member A is a protein that in humans is encoded by the CLEC1A gene.

This gene encodes a member of the C-type lectin/C-type lectin-like domain (CTL/CTLD) superfamily. Members of this family share a common protein fold and have diverse functions, such as cell adhesion, cell-cell signalling, glycoprotein turnover, and roles in inflammation and immune response. The encoded protein may play a role in regulating dendritic cell function. Alternative splice variants have been described but their biological nature has not been determined. This gene is closely linked to other CTL/CTLD superfamily members on chromosome 12p13 in the natural killer gene complex region.
