= CLEC16A =

Protein-coding gene in humans

Identifiers
- Aliases: CLEC16A, Gop-1, KIAA0350, C-type lectin domain family 16 member A, C-type lectin domain containing 16A
- External IDs: OMIM: 611303; MGI: 1921624; GeneCards: CLEC16A

Gene location (Human)
Chr.	Chromosome 16 (human)
Band	16p13.13	Start	10,944,564 bp
Band	16p13.13	End	11,182,186 bp

Gene location (Mouse)
Chr.	Chromosome 16 (mouse)
Band	16|16 A1	Start	10,363,203 bp
Band	16|16 A1	End	10,562,742 bp
RNA expression pattern
Bgee	Human / Mouse (ortholog); Top expressed in: left testis; right testis; sural nerve; right hemisphere of cerebellum; epithelium of colon; apex of heart; right frontal lobe; Brodmann area 10; anterior pituitary; gastrocnemius muscle / Top expressed in: dentate gyrus of hippocampal formation granule cell; muscle of thigh; primary visual cortex; superior frontal gyrus; medial geniculate nucleus; cerebellar cortex; subiculum; inferior colliculi; primary motor cortex; lateral geniculate nucleus; More reference expression data
BioGPS	n/a
Gene ontology
Molecular function	molecular function
Cellular component	lysosomal membrane; endosome; lysosome; endosome membrane; membrane; endolysosome membrane; Golgi apparatus; cytosol; vesicle; late endosome; integral component of membrane
Biological process	autophagy; positive regulation of autophagosome maturation; negative regulation of proteasomal ubiquitin-dependent protein catabolic process; negative regulation of mitophagy; cellular response to starvation; negative regulation of autophagosome maturation; positive regulation of TORC1 signaling; negative regulation of macroautophagy by TORC1 signaling; endosome to lysosome transport; endosomal transport
Sources:Amigo / QuickGO
Orthologs
Databases	NCBI: entry; OMA: entry
Species	Human	Mouse
Entrez	23274	74374
Ensembl	ENSG00000038532	ENSMUSG00000068663
UniProt	Q2KHT3	Q80U30
RefSeq (mRNA)	NM_001243403; NM_015226	NM_001204229; NM_177562
RefSeq (protein)	NP_001230332; NP_056041	NP_001191158; NP_808230
Location (UCSC)	Chr 16: 10.94 – 11.18 Mb	Chr 16: 10.36 – 10.56 Mb
PubMed search
- Wikidata
View/Edit Human	View/Edit Mouse

C-type lectin domain family 16, also known as CLEC16A, is a protein that in humans is encoded by the CLEC16A gene.

== Function ==
Little is known regarding the function of the CLEC16A protein, however it is shown to be highly expressed on B-lymphocytes, natural killer (NK) and dendritic cells. Despite its name CLEC16A may not function as a lectin because its C-type lectin domain is only 20 amino-acids long.

== Clinical significance ==
Polymorphisms in the CLEC16A gene are associated with an increased risk of multiple sclerosis as well as type I diabetes.
