= Mincle receptor =

CLEC4E

Identifiers
- Aliases: CLEC4E, CLECSF9, MINCLE, C-type lectin domain family 4 member E
- External IDs: OMIM: 609962; MGI: 1861232; GeneCards: CLEC4E
Available structures
PDB	Ortholog search: PDBe RCSB
PDB	List of PDB id codes 3WH2, 3WH3

Gene location (Human)
Chr.	Chromosome 12 (human)
Band	12p13.31	Start	8,533,305 bp
Band	12p13.31	End	8,540,905 bp

Gene location (Mouse)
Chr.	Chromosome 6 (mouse)
Band	6 F2|6 58.35 cM	Start	123,258,748 bp
Band	6 F2|6 58.35 cM	End	123,266,829 bp
RNA expression pattern
Bgee	Human / Mouse (ortholog); Top expressed in: monocyte; blood; granulocyte; right lung; spleen; trabecular bone; bone marrow; upper lobe of left lung; gallbladder; appendix / Top expressed in: granulocyte; blood; embryo; tibiofemoral joint; embryo; bone marrow; stroma of bone marrow; esophagus; spleen; thymus; More reference expression data
BioGPS	n/a
Gene ontology
Molecular function	carbohydrate binding; signaling receptor activity; metal ion binding; calcium ion binding; pattern recognition receptor activity
Cellular component	integral component of membrane; plasma membrane; membrane
Biological process	stimulatory C-type lectin receptor signaling pathway; T cell differentiation involved in immune response; defense response to bacterium; immune response; Fc-gamma receptor signaling pathway; immune system process; innate immune response; pattern recognition receptor signaling pathway
Sources:Amigo / QuickGO
Orthologs
Databases	NCBI: entry; OMA: entry
Species	Human	Mouse
Entrez	26253	56619
Ensembl	ENSG00000166523	ENSMUSG00000030142
UniProt	Q9ULY5	Q9R0Q8
RefSeq (mRNA)	NM_014358	NM_019948
RefSeq (protein)	NP_055173	NP_064332
Location (UCSC)	Chr 12: 8.53 – 8.54 Mb	Chr 6: 123.26 – 123.27 Mb
PubMed search
- Wikidata
View/Edit Human	View/Edit Mouse

Macrophage inducible Ca^{2+}-dependent lectin receptor, (abbreviated to Mincle), is a member of the C-type lectin superfamily encoded by the gene CLEC4E. It is a pattern recognition receptor that can recognize glycolipids including mycobacterial cord factor, trehalose-6,6'-dimycolate (TDM). The mincle receptor binds a range of carbohydrate structures, predominantly containing glucose or mannose, and play an important role in recognition of bacterial glycolipids by the immune system. Upon activation by cord factor, Mincle binds the Fc receptor FcRγ and Syk. Cord factor also binds and activates the related C-type lectin MCL. Upon receptor stimulation is PKC-δ activated, which subsequently phosphorylates CARD9 that triggers recruitment of BCL10 and MALT1, leading to a CARD-CC/BCL10/MALT1 (CBM) signaling complex. This signaling complex in turn triggers downstream recruitment of TRAF6 and NF-κB activation.

A wide range of ligands promote signalling through Mincle, including proteins, sterols and glycolipids from altered or damaged self, and various glycolipids from pathogenic and commensal organisms.

== Mincle agonists from self ==
Crystalline cholesterol, which accumulates in atherosclerotic lesions, can signal through human Mincle. Cholesterol sulfate, which is present in the skin, is a cause of sterile inflammation through agonizing Mincle signalling. The protein SAP130 signal through Mincle. Beta-glucosylceramide, which accumulates as a result of the lysosomal storage disorder Gaucher's disease, signals through Mincle.

== Mincle agonists from microbes ==
Mycobacteria and corynebacteria produce a wide range of glycolipids that can signal through Mincle. These include glucose and trehalose mycolates, and their closely related corynomycolates from mycobacteria and corynebacteria. Glycosyl diglycerides from various pathogenic and commensal bacteria and fungi such as Lactobacillus plantarum, Streptococcus pneumoniae, Mycobacterium tuberculosis and Malassezia sp.

== See also ==
- Pattern recognition receptors
- C-type lectin
