= C-type lectin domain family 4 member F =

Protein found in humans

CLEC4F

Identifiers
- Aliases: CLEC4F, CLECSF13, KCLR, C-type lectin domain family 4 member F
- External IDs: MGI: 1859834; GeneCards: CLEC4F

Gene location (Human)
Chr.	Chromosome 2 (human)
Band	2p13.3	Start	70,808,643 bp
Band	2p13.3	End	70,820,599 bp

Gene location (Mouse)
Chr.	Chromosome 6 (mouse)
Band	6|6 C3	Start	83,621,524 bp
Band	6|6 C3	End	83,633,169 bp
RNA expression pattern
Bgee	Human / Mouse (ortholog); Top expressed in: granulocyte; monocyte; smooth muscle tissue; spleen; body of uterus; apex of heart; gallbladder; duodenum; skin of abdomen; skin of leg / Top expressed in: liver; left lobe of liver; embryo; thoracic diaphragm; sexually immature organism; yolk sac; heart; pancreas; islet of Langerhans; jejunum; More reference expression data
BioGPS	n/a
Gene ontology
Molecular function	carbohydrate binding
Cellular component	membrane; integral component of membrane
Biological process	endocytosis
Sources:Amigo / QuickGO
Orthologs
Databases	NCBI: entry; OMA: entry
Species	Human	Mouse
Entrez	165530	51811
Ensembl	ENSG00000152672	ENSMUSG00000014542
UniProt	Q8N1N0	P70194
RefSeq (mRNA)	NM_001258027; NM_173535; NM_001321308	NM_016751
RefSeq (protein)	NP_001244956; NP_001308237; NP_775806; NP_001244956.1	NP_058031
Location (UCSC)	Chr 2: 70.81 – 70.82 Mb	Chr 6: 83.62 – 83.63 Mb
PubMed search
- Wikidata
View/Edit Human	View/Edit Mouse

C-type lectin domain family 4 member F is a protein that in humans is encoded by the CLEC4F gene.
