= KLRA1 =

killer cell lectin-like receptor, subfamily A, member 2

Identifiers
- Organism: Mus musculus
- Symbol: Klra2
- Alt. symbols: Ly49b; Klra30
- Entrez: 16633
- RefSeq (mRNA): NM_008462.5
- RefSeq (Prot): NP_032488.4
- UniProt: Q60660

Other data
- Chromosome: 6: 131.22 - 131.25 Mb
Search for
- Structures: Swiss-model
- Domains: InterPro

Killer cell lectin-like receptor subfamily A pseudogene 1

Identifiers
- Symbol: KLRAP1
- Alt. symbols: KLRA1; Ly49; LY49L; Ly-49L
- NCBI gene: 10748
- HGNC: 6372
- OMIM: 604274
- RefSeq: NM_006611
- UniProt: O75889

Other data
- Locus: Chr. 12 p12-p13
Search for
- Structures: Swiss-model
- Domains: InterPro

Killer cell lectin-like receptor subfamily A (KLRA, alternative nomenclature Ly49) is a gene cluster coding proteins from family Ly49, which are membrane receptors expressed mainly on the surface of NK cells and other cells of immune system in some mammals including rodents and cattle but not humans. Mouse Klra gene cluster is located on chromosome 6 and comprises 20-30 genes and pseudogenes, e.g. Klra1 (Ly49A). Klra gene family is highly polymorphic and polygenic and various mouse strains encode different number of Klra genes.

The homologous human KLRAP1 gene has been classified as a transcribed pseudogene because all associated transcripts are candidates for nonsense-mediated decay (NMD).
