= CLEC3B =

Protein-coding gene in humans

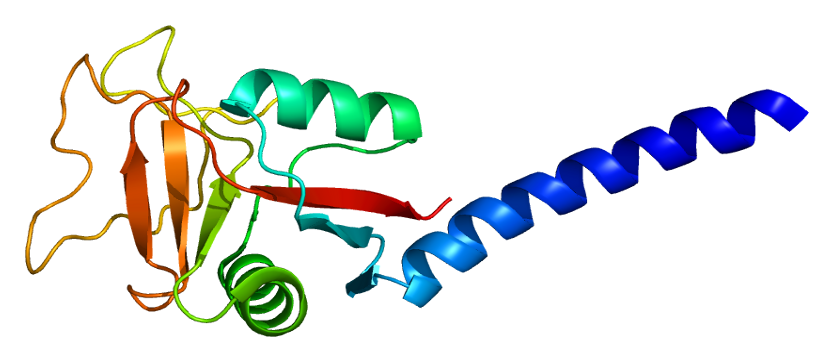

Identifiers
- Aliases: CLEC3B, TN, TNA, C-type lectin domain family 3 member B
- External IDs: OMIM: 187520; MGI: 104540; GeneCards: CLEC3B
Available structures
PDB	Ortholog search: PDBe RCSB
PDB	List of PDB id codes 1HTN, 1RJH, 1TN3, 3L9J

Gene location (Human)
Chr.	Chromosome 3 (human)
Band	3p21.31	Start	45,001,548 bp
Band	3p21.31	End	45,036,071 bp

Gene location (Mouse)
Chr.	Chromosome 9 (mouse)
Band	9 F4|9 73.91 cM	Start	122,980,011 bp
Band	9 F4|9 73.91 cM	End	122,986,497 bp
RNA expression pattern
Bgee	Human / Mouse (ortholog); Top expressed in: subcutaneous adipose tissue; apex of heart; right auricle of heart; tibial nerve; right lung; placenta; spleen; right testis; right coronary artery; upper lobe of left lung / Top expressed in: lip; ankle; esophagus; muscle of thigh; skin of external ear; ankle joint; right lung; right lung lobe; intercostal muscle; left lung lobe; More reference expression data
BioGPS	n/a
Gene ontology
Molecular function	calcium ion binding; heparin binding; kringle domain binding; carbohydrate binding
Cellular component	cytoplasm; extracellular matrix; extracellular exosome; granular component; platelet dense granule lumen; extracellular space; extracellular region; collagen-containing extracellular matrix
Biological process	cellular response to organic substance; bone mineralization; cellular response to transforming growth factor beta stimulus; positive regulation of plasminogen activation; ossification; platelet degranulation
Sources:Amigo / QuickGO
Orthologs
Databases	NCBI: entry; OMA: entry
Species	Human	Mouse
Entrez	7123	21922
Ensembl	ENSG00000163815	ENSMUSG00000025784
UniProt	P05452	P43025; Q8CFZ6
RefSeq (mRNA)	NM_001308394; NM_003278	NM_011606
RefSeq (protein)	NP_001295323; NP_003269	NP_035736
Location (UCSC)	Chr 3: 45 – 45.04 Mb	Chr 9: 122.98 – 122.99 Mb
PubMed search
- Wikidata
View/Edit Human	View/Edit Mouse

Tetranectin is a protein that in humans is encoded by the CLEC3B gene.
