= CLEC2B =

Protein-coding gene in humans

Identifiers
- Aliases: CLEC2B, AICL, CLECSF2, HP10085, IFNRG1, C-type lectin domain family 2 member B
- External IDs: OMIM: 603242; GeneCards: CLEC2B

Gene location (Human)
Chr.	Chromosome 12 (human)
Band	12p13.31	Start	9,852,369 bp
Band	12p13.31	End	9,869,386 bp
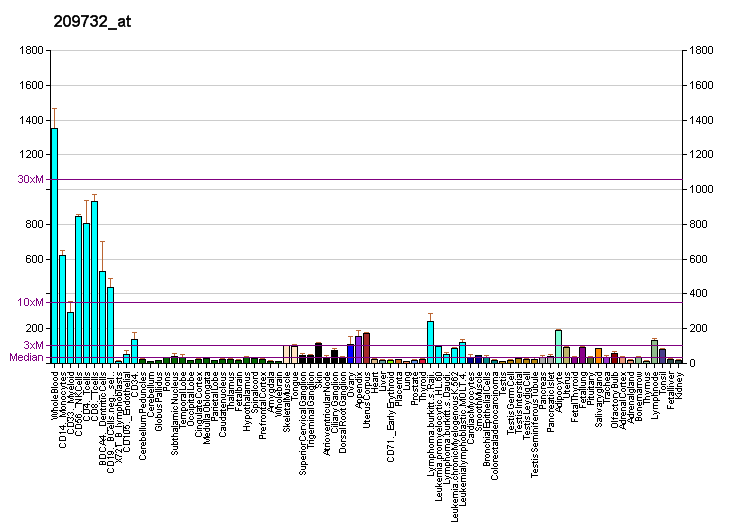
RNA expression pattern
Bgee	Human / Mouse (ortholog); Top expressed in: skin of thigh; skin of hip; periodontal fiber; glutes; vena cava; pericardium; mononuclear cell; human penis; monocyte; vulva / n/a; More reference expression data
BioGPS	More reference expression data
Gene ontology
Molecular function	carbohydrate binding; identical protein binding
Cellular component	plasma membrane; integral component of plasma membrane; integral component of membrane; membrane
Biological process	regulation of immune response
Sources:Amigo / QuickGO
Orthologs
Databases	NCBI: entry; OMA: entry
Species	Human	Mouse
Entrez	9976	n/a
Ensembl	ENSG00000110852	n/a
UniProt	Q92478	n/a
RefSeq (mRNA)	NM_005127	n/a
RefSeq (protein)	NP_005118	n/a
Location (UCSC)	Chr 12: 9.85 – 9.87 Mb	n/a
PubMed search		n/a
- Wikidata
View/Edit Human

C-type lectin domain family 2 member B is a protein that in humans is encoded by the CLEC2B gene.

This gene encodes a member of the C-type lectin/C-type lectin-like domain (CTL/CTLD) protein superfamily. Members of this family share a common protein fold and have diverse functions, such as cell adhesion, cell-cell signaling, glycoprotein turnover, and roles in inflammation and immune response. The encoded type 2 transmembrane protein may function as a cell activation antigen. An alternative splice variant has been described but its full-length nucleotide sequence has not been determined. This gene is closely linked to other CTL/CTLD superfamily members on chromosome 12p13 in the natural killer gene complex region.
