= CLEC5A =

Protein found in humans

Identifiers
- Aliases: CLEC5A, CLECSF5, MDL-1, MDL1, C-type lectin domain family 5 member A, C-type lectin domain containing 5A
- External IDs: OMIM: 604987; MGI: 1345151; GeneCards: CLEC5A
Available structures
PDB	Ortholog search: PDBe RCSB
PDB	List of PDB id codes 2YHF

Gene location (Human)
Chr.	Chromosome 7 (human)
Band	7q34	Start	141,927,357 bp
Band	7q34	End	141,947,007 bp

Gene location (Mouse)
Chr.	Chromosome 6 (mouse)
Band	6|6 B1	Start	40,551,828 bp
Band	6|6 B1	End	40,562,755 bp
RNA expression pattern
Bgee	Human / Mouse (ortholog); Top expressed in: bone marrow; bone marrow cell; trabecular bone; monocyte; testicle; right coronary artery; granulocyte; upper lobe of left lung; tibial nerve; Descending thoracic aorta / Top expressed in: granulocyte; embryo; bone marrow; tibiofemoral joint; stroma of bone marrow; lumbar subsegment of spinal cord; calvaria; right kidney; dentate gyrus of hippocampal formation granule cell; esophagus; More reference expression data
BioGPS	n/a
Gene ontology
Molecular function	carbohydrate binding; virus receptor activity; protein binding
Cellular component	integral component of membrane; integral component of plasma membrane; membrane; cell surface; specific granule membrane; tertiary granule membrane; cytosol; plasma membrane
Biological process	cellular defense response; myeloid cell differentiation; negative regulation of myeloid cell apoptotic process; viral process; signal transduction; immune system process; viral entry into host cell; negative regulation of apoptotic process; osteoblast development; innate immune response; neutrophil degranulation
Sources:Amigo / QuickGO
Orthologs
Databases	NCBI: entry; OMA: entry
Species	Human	Mouse
Entrez	23601	23845
Ensembl	ENSG00000258227	ENSMUSG00000029915
UniProt	Q9NY25	Q9R007
RefSeq (mRNA)	NM_001301167; NM_013252	NM_001038604; NM_021364
RefSeq (protein)	NP_001288096; NP_037384	NP_001033693; NP_067339
Location (UCSC)	Chr 7: 141.93 – 141.95 Mb	Chr 6: 40.55 – 40.56 Mb
PubMed search
- Wikidata
View/Edit Human	View/Edit Mouse

C-type lectin domain family 5 member A (CLEC5A), also known as C-type lectin superfamily member 5 (CLECSF5) and myeloid DAP12-associating lectin 1 (MDL-1) is a C-type lectin that in humans is encoded by the CLEC5A gene.

Structurally MDL-1 is a type II transmembrane protein with a short cytoplasmic tail and without signaling motifs, therefore it requires association with the adaptor protein DAP12 to generate signals via Syk pathway.

MDL-1 is highly expressed on myeloid lineages like neutrophil, monocyte, macrophage and also osteoclast, microglia and dendritic cells.

Activation of MDL-1 induces production of many cytokines (TNF-α, IL-1, IL-6, IL-8 and IL-17A) and chemokines (MIP-1α, RANTES, IP-10, MDC). MDL-1 also amplifies innate immune response.

== Viral pathology ==
The most known ligand for CLEC5A is dengue virus (DV). Activated CLEC5A by binding to the dengue virion leads to phosphorylation of DAP12 and through Syk pathway are induced proinflammatory cytokines. CLEC5A is responsible for dengue virus induced hemorrhagic fever (DHF) and dengue shock syndrome (DSS), which is the most severe immune response to dengue virus infection and it is characterized by plasma leakage because of the increased vascular permeability. Interaction of CLEC5A and dengue virus also induces osteolytic activity.

Another pathogen is influenza virus and its hemagglutinin protein, which interacts with CLEC5A. Through this interaction is stimulated innate immune response and it leads to secretion of proinflammatory cytokines.

The researchers discovered that Japanese encephalitis virus (JEV) also binds to CLEC5A and contributes to viral pathology.

== Use in therapy ==
With the discovery of CLEC5A interactions with different viruses, scientists are testing blocking anti-CLEC5A antibodies, Syk pathway inhibitors and CLEC5A deficient mice to discover CLEC5A contribution to pathological progress.

In the case of dengue virus, monoclonal anti-CLEC5A antibodies are able to suppress the secretion of proinflammatory cytokines without affecting IFN-α. Blockade of CLEC5A signaling in DV infected cells can attenuate vascular leakage and increase survival of patients with DHF and DSS.

In lethal challenges of recombinant H5N1 influenza virus, the CLEC5A deficient mice showed reduced levels of proinflammatory cytokines, decreased immune cell infiltration in the lungs and improved survival compared to the wild-type mice even with comparable viral loads.

For the Japanese encephalitis virus, blockade of CLEC5A cannot inhibit infection of neurons and astrocytes, however anti-CLEC5A decreases proinflammatory cytokines and toxic substances released from microglia.
