= KLRC4 =

Protein-coding gene in the species Homo sapiens

Identifiers
- Aliases: KLRC4, NKG2-F, NKG2F, killer cell lectin like receptor C4
- External IDs: OMIM: 602893; GeneCards: KLRC4

Gene location (Human)
| Chr. | Chromosome 12 (human) |
| Band | 12p13.2 | Start | 10,407,384 bp |
| Band | 12p13.2 | End | 10,409,757 bp |
RNA expression pattern
| Bgee | Human / Mouse (ortholog); Top expressed in: granulocyte; lymph node; gallbladder; spleen; corpus callosum; appendix; right lung; rectum; right uterine tube; amygdala / n/a; More reference expression data |
| BioGPS | n/a |
Orthologs
| Databases | NCBI: entry; OMA: entry |
| Species | Human | Mouse |
| Entrez | 8302 | n/a |
| Ensembl | ENSG00000183542 | n/a |
| UniProt | O43908 | n/a |
| RefSeq (mRNA) | NM_013431 | n/a |
| RefSeq (protein) | NP_038459 | n/a |
| Location (UCSC) | Chr 12: 10.41 – 10.41 Mb | n/a |
| PubMed search | | n/a |
- Wikidata
| View/Edit Human |

NKG2-F type II integral membrane protein is a protein that in humans is encoded by the KLRC4 gene.

Natural killer (NK) cells are lymphocytes that can mediate lysis of certain tumor cells and virus-infected cells without previous activation. They can also regulate specific humoral and cell-mediated immunity. NK cells preferentially express several calcium-dependent (C-type) lectins, which have been implicated in the regulation of NK cell function. KLRC4 is a member of the NKG2 group which are expressed primarily in natural killer (NK) cells and encodes a family of transmembrane proteins characterized by a type II membrane orientation (extracellular C terminus) and the presence of a C-type lectin domain. The NKG2 gene family is located within the NK complex, a region that contains several C-type lectin genes preferentially expressed on NK cells. The 3' end of the KLRC4 transcript includes the first non-coding exon found at the 5' end of the adjacent D12S2489E gene transcript.
