= CLEC12A =

Protein-coding gene in humans

Identifiers
- Aliases: CLEC12A, CLL-1, CLL1, DCAL-2, MICL, CD371, C-type lectin domain family 12 member A
- External IDs: OMIM: 612088; MGI: 3040968; GeneCards: CLEC12A

Gene location (Human)
| Chr. | Chromosome 12 (human) |
| Band | 12p13.31 | Start | 9,951,316 bp |
| Band | 12p13.31 | End | 9,995,694 bp |

Gene location (Mouse)
| Chr. | Chromosome 6 (mouse) |
| Band | 6|6 F3 | Start | 129,319,654 bp |
| Band | 6|6 F3 | End | 129,342,266 bp |
RNA expression pattern
| Bgee | Human / Mouse (ortholog); Top expressed in: monocyte; granulocyte; bone marrow; trabecular bone; blood; bone marrow cell; spleen; appendix; right lung; testicle / Top expressed in: granulocyte; primary oocyte; left lobe of liver; secondary oocyte; zygote; bone marrow; spleen; right lobe of liver; pharynx; placenta; More reference expression data |
| BioGPS | n/a |
Gene ontology
| Molecular function | carbohydrate binding |
| Cellular component | membrane; integral component of membrane; plasma membrane; specific granule membrane; tertiary granule membrane |
| Biological process | neutrophil degranulation |
Sources:Amigo / QuickGO
Orthologs
| Databases | NCBI: entry; OMA: entry |
| Species | Human | Mouse |
| Entrez | 160364 | 232413 |
| Ensembl | ENSG00000172322 | ENSMUSG00000053063 |
| UniProt | Q5QGZ9 | Q504P2 |
| RefSeq (mRNA) | NM_001207010; NM_001300730; NM_138337; NM_201623; NM_201625 | NM_177686 |
| RefSeq (protein) | NP_001193939; NP_001287659; NP_612210; NP_963917 | NP_808354 |
| Location (UCSC) | Chr 12: 9.95 – 10 Mb | Chr 6: 129.32 – 129.34 Mb |
| PubMed search |
- Wikidata
| View/Edit Human | View/Edit Mouse |

C-type lectin domain family 12 member A is a protein that in humans is encoded by the CLEC12A gene.

This gene encodes a member of the C-type lectin/C-type lectin-like domain (CTL/CTLD) superfamily. Members of this family share a common protein fold and have diverse functions, such as cell adhesion, cell-cell signaling, glycoprotein turnover, and roles in inflammation and immune response. The protein encoded by this gene is a negative regulator of granulocyte and monocyte function. Several alternatively spliced transcript variants of this gene have been described, but the full-length nature of some of these variants has not been determined. This gene is closely linked to other CTL/CTLD superfamily members in the natural killer gene complex region on chromosome 12p13.

CLEC12A, also known as MICL, is inhibitory C-type lectin-like receptor. It contains ITIM motif in cytoplasmic tail that can associate with signaling phosphatases SHP-1 and SHP-2.

There are two types, human (hMICL) and murine (mMICL). Human MICL is expressed as a monomer primarily on myeloid cells, including granulocytes, monocytes, macrophages and dendritic cells.

Murine MICL is expressed as dimer on granulocytes, monocytes but also on B lymphocytes and can be also found on NK cells surface in bone marrow.

== Use in therapy ==
In the immunotherapy of acute myeloid leukemia (AML), CLL-1 becomes one of the target due to its high expression in AML cells while being absent in normal hematopoietic stem cells. CLL-1 is also expressed on the surface of leukemic stem cells (LSC), which possesses the ability to indefinitely self-renew, produce plenty of leukemic cells and are associated with leukemia relapses.

Scientists are working on various therapeutic approaches using CLL-1 as a target for AML. One of them is development of bispecific antibodies such as CD3/CLL-1 antibody. It can recruit unstimulated primary T cells in patients against cancer cells with CLL-1 on surface.

Other way is development of CAR T cells specific for CLL-1 antigen. This principle showed efficient and specific anti-leukemia activity to AML cell lines from AML patients, as well as in mouse model.
