= OLR1 =

Protein-coding gene in the species Homo sapiens

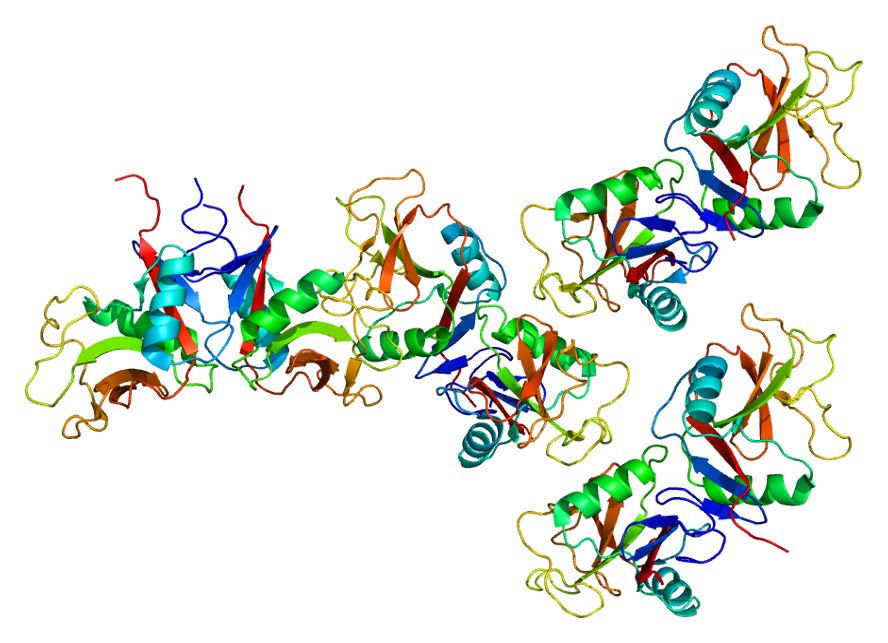

Identifiers
- Aliases: OLR1, CLEC8A, LOX1, LOXIN, SCARE1, SLOX1, oxidized low density lipoprotein receptor 1
- External IDs: OMIM: 602601; MGI: 1261434; GeneCards: OLR1
Available structures
PDB	Ortholog search: PDBe RCSB
PDB	List of PDB id codes 1YPO, 1YPQ, 1YPU, 1YXJ, 1YXK, 3VLG

Gene location (Human)
Chr.	Chromosome 12 (human)
Band	12p13.2	Start	10,158,301 bp
Band	12p13.2	End	10,172,138 bp

Gene location (Mouse)
Chr.	Chromosome 6 (mouse)
Band	6|6 F3	Start	129,462,207 bp
Band	6|6 F3	End	129,484,128 bp
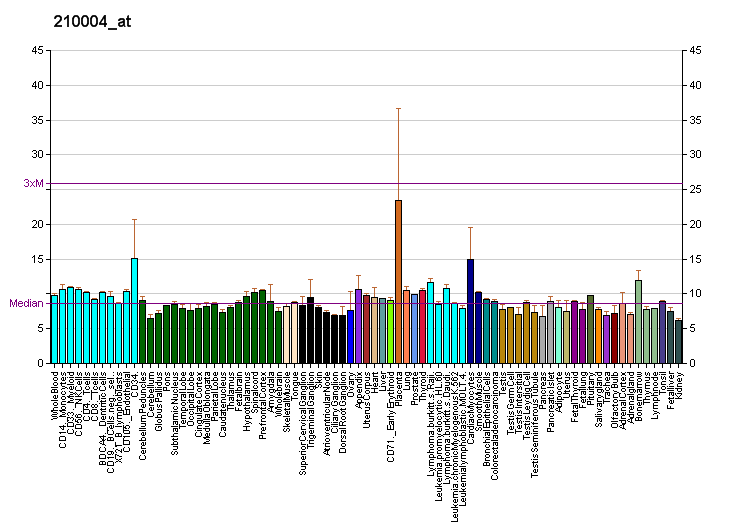
RNA expression pattern
Bgee	Human / Mouse (ortholog); Top expressed in: right lung; C1 segment; bone marrow cell; upper lobe of left lung; lower lobe of lung; placenta; corpus callosum; testicle; appendix; gallbladder / Top expressed in: gastrula; decidua; granulocyte; right lung lobe; embryo; tibiofemoral joint; primordial ventricle; blastocyst; uterus; bone marrow; More reference expression data
BioGPS	More reference expression data
Gene ontology
Molecular function	protein binding; carbohydrate binding; identical protein binding
Cellular component	integral component of membrane; membrane; intracellular membrane-bounded organelle; receptor complex; plasma membrane; integral component of plasma membrane; nucleoplasm; extracellular region; membrane raft; specific granule membrane; tertiary granule membrane
Biological process	immune system process; blood circulation; proteolysis; cell adhesion; inflammatory response; leukocyte migration; neutrophil degranulation
Sources:Amigo / QuickGO
Orthologs
Databases	NCBI: entry; OMA: entry
Species	Human	Mouse
Entrez	4973	108078
Ensembl	ENSG00000173391	ENSMUSG00000030162
UniProt	P78380	Q9EQ09
RefSeq (mRNA)	NM_001172632; NM_001172633; NM_002543	NM_001301094; NM_001301096; NM_138648
RefSeq (protein)	NP_001166103; NP_001166104; NP_002534	NP_001288023; NP_001288025; NP_619589
Location (UCSC)	Chr 12: 10.16 – 10.17 Mb	Chr 6: 129.46 – 129.48 Mb
PubMed search
- Wikidata
View/Edit Human	View/Edit Mouse

Oxidized low-density lipoprotein receptor 1 (Ox-LDL receptor 1) also known as lectin-type oxidized LDL receptor 1 (LOX-1) is a protein that in humans is encoded by the OLR1 gene.

LOX-1 is the main receptor for oxidized LDL on endothelial cells, macrophages, smooth muscle cells, and other cell types. But minimally oxidized LDL is more readily recognized by the TLR4 receptor, and highly oxidized LDL is more readily recognized by the CD36 receptor.

== Function ==
LOX-1 is a receptor protein which belongs to the C-type lectin superfamily. Its gene is regulated through the cyclic AMP signaling pathway. The protein binds, internalizes and degrades oxidized low-density lipoprotein.

Normally, LOX-1 expression on endothelial cells is low, but tumor necrosis factor alpha, oxidized LDL, blood vessel shear stress, and other atherosclerotic stimuli substantially increase LOX-1 expression.

LOX-1 may be involved in the regulation of Fas-induced apoptosis. Oxidized LDL induces endothelial cell apoptosis through LOX-1 binding. Other ligands for LOX-1 include oxidized high-density lipoprotein, advanced glycation end-products, platelets, and apoptotic cells. The binding of platelets to LOX-1 causes a release of vasoconstrictive endothelin, which induces endothelial dysfunction.

== Clinical significance ==
Binding of oxidized LDL to LOX-1 activates NF-κB, leading to monocyte adhesion to enthothelial cells (a pre-requisite for the macrophage foam cell formation of atherosclerosis). Macrophage affinity for unmodified LDL particles is low, but is greatly increased when the LDL particles are oxidized. LDL oxidation occurs in the sub-endothelial space, rather than in the circulation. But oxidized cholesterol from foods cooked at high temperature can also be a source of oxysterols.

OLR1 gene polymorphisms have been associated with coronary artery disease.
