= CLEC10A =

Protein-coding gene in humans

Identifiers
- Aliases: CLEC10A, CD301, CLECSF13, CLECSF14, HML, HML2, MGL, C-type lectin domain family 10 member A, C-type lectin domain containing 10A
- External IDs: OMIM: 605999; MGI: 96975; GeneCards: CLEC10A

Gene location (Human)
Chr.	Chromosome 17 (human)
Band	17p13.1	Start	7,074,537 bp
Band	17p13.1	End	7,080,307 bp

Gene location (Mouse)
Chr.	Chromosome 11 (mouse)
Band	11 B3|11 42.99 cM	Start	70,047,023 bp
Band	11 B3|11 42.99 cM	End	70,061,660 bp
RNA expression pattern
Bgee	Human / Mouse (ortholog); Top expressed in: oocyte; secondary oocyte; granulocyte; monocyte; right coronary artery; gallbladder; appendix; rectum; lymph node; testicle / Top expressed in: stroma of bone marrow; white adipose tissue; skin of external ear; subcutaneous adipose tissue; tunica adventitia of aorta; mammary gland; lip; primary oocyte; muscle of thigh; sciatic nerve; More reference expression data
BioGPS	n/a
Gene ontology
Molecular function	carbohydrate binding
Cellular component	integral component of membrane; plasma membrane; membrane
Biological process	innate immune response; endocytosis; adaptive immune response; immune system process; stimulatory C-type lectin receptor signaling pathway
Sources:Amigo / QuickGO
Orthologs
Databases	NCBI: entry; OMA: entry
Species	Human	Mouse
Entrez	10462	17312
Ensembl	ENSG00000132514	ENSMUSG00000000318
UniProt	Q8IUN9	P49300
RefSeq (mRNA)	NM_006344; NM_182906; NM_001330070	NM_001204252; NM_010796
RefSeq (protein)	NP_001316999; NP_006335; NP_878910	NP_001191181; NP_034926
Location (UCSC)	Chr 17: 7.07 – 7.08 Mb	Chr 11: 70.05 – 70.06 Mb
PubMed search
- Wikidata
View/Edit Human	View/Edit Mouse

C-type lectin domain family 10 member A (CLEC10A) also designated as CD301 is a protein that in humans is encoded by the CLEC10A gene. CLEC10A is part of the C-type lectin superfamily and binds to N-Acetylgalactosamine (GalNAc). It is mainly expressed on myeloid cells and also on oocytes and very early stages of embryogenesis. CLEC10A is used as a marker of the CD1c^{+} dendritic cell subgroup, also called cDC2. The actions of CLEC10A are diverse, depending on the ligand and environment.

== Function ==
Generally, C-type lectins bind carbohydrate moieties usually in the presence of Ca2^{+} and have diverse functions, such as cell adhesion, cell-cell signalling, glycoprotein turnover, and roles in inflammation and immune response.

CLEC10A is a type II transmembrane protein (passing one time through the membrane and oriented with the N terminus inward) that induces endocytosis after ligand binding. To release the ligand in the endosome, participating Ca2^{+} ions have to be unbound first. This leads to a significant increase in cytoplasmic Ca2^{+} concentration.

CLEC10A binds most strongly to N-Acetylgalactosamine (GalNAc), preferring α-GalNAc over β-GalNAc, unmodified galactose is bound very weakly. CLEC10A is the only C-type lectin within the human immune system that exclusively recognizes terminal GalNAc. This includes the Tn antigen (GalNAc O-bound to serine or threonine) which is prominently expressed on carcinomas, where it can also be sialylated. These tumor-associated antigens (Neu5Acα2,6-Tn, and NeuGcα2,6-Tn) are also bound.

CLEC10A has also been shown to bind GalNAc in the teichoic acid of the Staphylococcus aureus cell wall and the surface of parasites.

CLEC10A is expressed by dendritic cells that differentiate from monocytes recruited to inflammatory environments.

CD45 contains a Tn antigen in exon B. CD45 has 3 important exons (4,5,6), that are designated A,B,C. Isoforms of CD45 are labeled depending on the presence of these exons. CLEC10A can for example bind CD45RB or CD45R, which is shorthand for CD45RABC. Binding causes attenuation of T cell activity, apoptosis, and immunosuppression. However, active T cells express shorter isoforms of CD45 (CD45RO, CD45RA) that lack exon B.

CLEC10A signalling induces IL-10 production in dendritic cells, in part through increasing intracellular Ca2^{+} concentration. IL-10 is the main regulatory and anti-inflammatory cytokine produced in humans. In contrast, low concentrations of intracellular Ca^{2+} result in production of IL-12, a pro-inflammatory cytokine that also leads to Th1 polarisation.

In cancer research, CLEC10A expression was found to both improve and worsen survival.

In animal models, deficiency of the orthologue to CLEC10A, Mgl1 is associated with worse outcomes in infection and excessive inflammation.
