= REG4 =

Protein-coding gene in humans

Identifiers
- Aliases: REG4, GISP, REG-IV, RELP, regenerating family member 4
- External IDs: OMIM: 609846; MGI: 1914959; GeneCards: REG4
Available structures
PDB	Ortholog search: PDBe RCSB
PDB	List of PDB id codes 2KV3

Gene location (Human)
Chr.	Chromosome 1 (human)
Band	1p12	Start	119,794,017 bp
Band	1p12	End	119,811,580 bp

Gene location (Mouse)
Chr.	Chromosome 3 (mouse)
Band	3|3 F2.2	Start	98,129,472 bp
Band	3|3 F2.2	End	98,144,064 bp
RNA expression pattern
Bgee	Human / Mouse (ortholog); Top expressed in: mucosa of ileum; duodenum; jejunal mucosa; body of pancreas; mucosa of sigmoid colon; rectum; pancreatic ductal cell; appendix; testicle; mucosa of transverse colon / Top expressed in: crypt of lieberkuhn of small intestine; left colon; Paneth cell; duodenum; ileum; jejunum; intestinal villus; epithelium of small intestine; migratory enteric neural crest cell; embryo; More reference expression data
BioGPS	n/a
Gene ontology
Molecular function	calcium ion binding; heparin binding; mannan binding; carbohydrate binding; transmembrane signaling receptor activity
Cellular component	cytoplasm; extracellular region
Biological process	response to bacterium
Sources:Amigo / QuickGO
Orthologs
Databases	NCBI: entry; OMA: entry
Species	Human	Mouse
Entrez	83998	67709
Ensembl	ENSG00000134193	ENSMUSG00000027876
UniProt	Q9BYZ8	Q9D8G5
RefSeq (mRNA)	NM_032044; NM_001159352; NM_001159353	NM_026328
RefSeq (protein)	NP_001152824; NP_001152825; NP_114433	NP_080604
Location (UCSC)	Chr 1: 119.79 – 119.81 Mb	Chr 3: 98.13 – 98.14 Mb
PubMed search
- Wikidata
View/Edit Human	View/Edit Mouse

Regenerating islet-derived protein 4 (REG4) is a protein that in humans (Homo sapiens) is encoded by the REG4 gene. REG4 is located on Chromosome 1 in humans and is expressed in the proximal gastrointestinal (GI) tract.
