= Macrophage mannose receptor 1 =

Protein-coding gene in the species Homo sapiens

MRC1

Identifiers
- Aliases: MRC1, CD206, CLEC13D, CLEC13DL, MMR, MRC1L1, bA541I19.1, hMR, mannose receptor, C type 1, mannose receptor C-type 1
- External IDs: OMIM: 153618; MGI: 97142; GeneCards: MRC1
Available structures
PDB	Ortholog search: PDBe RCSB
PDB	List of PDB id codes 1EGG, 1EGI

Gene location (Human)
Chr.	Chromosome 10 (human)
Band	10p12.33	Start	17,809,348 bp
Band	10p12.33	End	17,911,164 bp

Gene location (Mouse)
Chr.	Chromosome 2 (mouse)
Band	2 A2|2 10.46 cM	Start	14,234,203 bp
Band	2 A2|2 10.46 cM	End	14,336,868 bp
RNA expression pattern
Bgee	Human / Mouse (ortholog); Top expressed in: lower lobe of lung; visceral pleura; secondary oocyte; decidua; pericardium; superficial temporal artery; synovial membrane; synovial joint; skin of hip; right ventricle / Top expressed in: stroma of bone marrow; vestibular sensory epithelium; dermis; umbilical cord; carotid body; tunica adventitia of aorta; skin of external ear; calvaria; efferent ductule; sciatic nerve; More reference expression data
BioGPS	n/a
Gene ontology
Molecular function	protein binding; mannose binding; transmembrane signaling receptor activity; carbohydrate binding; virus receptor activity
Cellular component	integral component of membrane; cell surface; endosome; plasma membrane; integral component of plasma membrane; endosome membrane; membrane
Biological process	cellular response to interferon-gamma; cellular response to interleukin-4; viral entry into host cell; viral process; cellular response to lipopolysaccharide; endocytosis; receptor-mediated endocytosis; signal transduction
Sources:Amigo / QuickGO
Orthologs
Databases	NCBI: entry; OMA: entry
Species	Human	Mouse
Entrez	4360	17533
Ensembl	ENSG00000260314	ENSMUSG00000026712
UniProt	P22897	Q61830
RefSeq (mRNA)	NM_002438; NM_001009567	NM_008625
RefSeq (protein)	NP_002429	NP_032651
Location (UCSC)	Chr 10: 17.81 – 17.91 Mb	Chr 2: 14.23 – 14.34 Mb
PubMed search
- Wikidata
View/Edit Human	View/Edit Mouse

Macrophage mannose receptor 1, also known as mannose receptor C-type 1, is a protein that in humans is encoded by the MRC1 gene.

== Function ==
The recognition of complex carbohydrate structures on glycoproteins is an important part of several biological processes, including cell-cell recognition, serum glycoprotein turnover, and neutralization of pathogens. The protein encoded by this gene is a type I membrane receptor that mediates the endocytosis of glycoproteins by macrophages. The protein has been shown to bind high-mannose structures on the surface of potentially pathogenic viruses, bacteria, and fungi so that they can be neutralized by phagocytic engulfment.
