= LY75 =

Protein-coding gene in the species Homo sapiens

Identifiers
- Aliases: LY75, CD205, CLEC13B, DEC-205, GP200-MR6, LY-75, lymphocyte antigen 75
- External IDs: OMIM: 604524; MGI: 106662; GeneCards: LY75

Gene location (Human)
Chr.	Chromosome 2 (human)
Band	2q24.2	Start	159,803,355 bp
Band	2q24.2	End	159,904,756 bp

Gene location (Mouse)
Chr.	Chromosome 2 (mouse)
Band	2|2 C1.1	Start	60,122,447 bp
Band	2|2 C1.1	End	60,213,647 bp
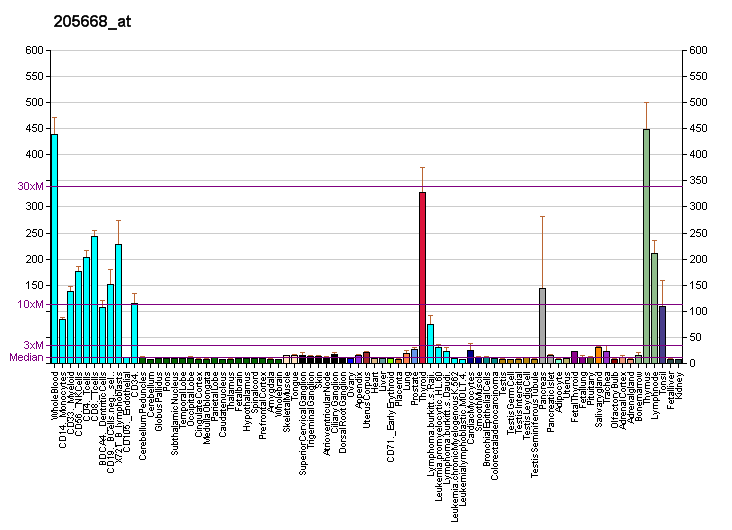
RNA expression pattern
Bgee	Human / Mouse (ortholog); Top expressed in: thymus; epithelium of nasopharynx; jejunal mucosa; bronchial epithelial cell; mucosa of paranasal sinus; nasal epithelium; skin of thigh; mucosa of sigmoid colon; lactiferous duct; pancreatic ductal cell / Top expressed in: granulocyte; thymus; primitive streak; yolk sac; lumbar spinal ganglion; jejunum; duodenum; tail of embryo; epiblast; blood; More reference expression data
BioGPS	More reference expression data
Gene ontology
Molecular function	protein binding; carbohydrate binding; transmembrane signaling receptor activity; signaling receptor activity
Cellular component	integral component of membrane; integral component of plasma membrane; extracellular exosome; membrane
Biological process	inflammatory response; endocytosis; immune response; signal transduction
Sources:Amigo / QuickGO
Orthologs
Databases	NCBI: entry; OMA: entry
Species	Human	Mouse
Entrez	4065	17076
Ensembl	ENSG00000054219	ENSMUSG00000026980
UniProt	O60449	Q60767
RefSeq (mRNA)	NM_002349	NM_013825
RefSeq (protein)	NP_001185688; NP_001185689	NP_038853
Location (UCSC)	Chr 2: 159.8 – 159.9 Mb	Chr 2: 60.12 – 60.21 Mb
PubMed search
- Wikidata
View/Edit Human	View/Edit Mouse

Lymphocyte antigen 75 also called CD205 is a protein that in humans is encoded by the LY75 gene.

CD205 is also known as DEC-205.
