= PLA2R1 =

Identifiers
- Aliases: PLA2R1, CLEC13C, PLA2-R, PLA2G1R, PLA2IR, PLA2R, phospholipase A2 receptor 1
- External IDs: OMIM: 604939; MGI: 102468; GeneCards: PLA2R1

Gene location (Human)
Chr.	Chromosome 2 (human)
Band	2q24.2	Start	159,932,006 bp
Band	2q24.2	End	160,062,615 bp

Gene location (Mouse)
Chr.	Chromosome 2 (mouse)
Band	2|2 C1.1	Start	60,247,887 bp
Band	2|2 C1.1	End	60,383,652 bp
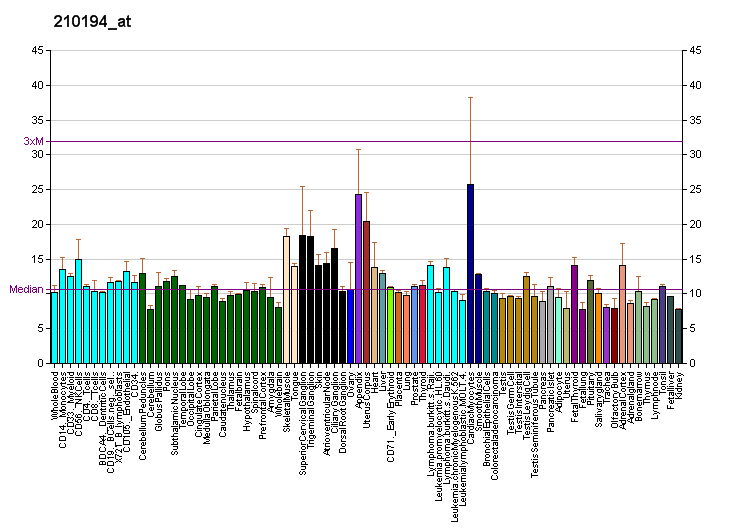
RNA expression pattern
Bgee	Human / Mouse (ortholog); Top expressed in: parotid gland; left lobe of thyroid gland; Achilles tendon; right lobe of thyroid gland; right coronary artery; popliteal artery; tibial arteries; olfactory zone of nasal mucosa; Descending thoracic aorta; skin of leg / Top expressed in: neural layer of retina; transitional epithelium of urinary bladder; molar; olfactory epithelium; retinal pigment epithelium; decidua; pineal gland; umbilical cord; gastrula; uterus; More reference expression data
BioGPS	More reference expression data
Gene ontology
Molecular function	phospholipase binding; carbohydrate binding; transmembrane signaling receptor activity; signaling receptor activity
Cellular component	integral component of membrane; extracellular region; cell surface; receptor complex; plasma membrane; membrane; integral component of plasma membrane
Biological process	cytokine production; positive regulation of DNA damage response, signal transduction by p53 class mediator; endocytosis; positive regulation of arachidonic acid secretion; receptor-mediated endocytosis; oxidative stress-induced premature senescence; reactive oxygen species metabolic process; replicative senescence; signal transduction; negative regulation of phospholipase A2 activity; negative regulation of arachidonic acid secretion
Sources:Amigo / QuickGO
Orthologs
Databases	NCBI: entry; OMA: entry
Species	Human	Mouse
Entrez	22925	18779
Ensembl	ENSG00000153246	ENSMUSG00000054580
UniProt	Q13018	Q62028
RefSeq (mRNA)	NM_001007267; NM_001195641; NM_007366	NM_008867
RefSeq (protein)	NP_001007268; NP_001182570; NP_031392	NP_032893
Location (UCSC)	Chr 2: 159.93 – 160.06 Mb	Chr 2: 60.25 – 60.38 Mb
PubMed search
- Wikidata
View/Edit Human	View/Edit Mouse

Secretory phospholipase A2 receptor is a protein that in humans is encoded by the PLA2R1 gene.

== Clinical significance ==
M-type phospholipase A2 receptor is the major antigen in idiopathic membranous nephropathy attributed to over 70% of cases.
