= CLEC4A =

Protein-coding gene in humans

Identifiers
- Aliases: CLEC4A, CLECSF6, DCIR, DDB27, LLIR, CD367, HDCGC13P, C-type lectin domain family 4 member A, hDCIR
- External IDs: OMIM: 605306; MGI: 1349412; GeneCards: CLEC4A
Available structures
PDB	Ortholog search: PDBe RCSB
PDB	List of PDB id codes 5B1W, 5B1X

Gene location (Human)
Chr.	Chromosome 12 (human)
Band	12p13.31	Start	8,123,617 bp
Band	12p13.31	End	8,138,607 bp

Gene location (Mouse)
Chr.	Chromosome 6 (mouse)
Band	6 F2|6 58.18 cM	Start	123,083,387 bp
Band	6 F2|6 58.18 cM	End	123,120,958 bp
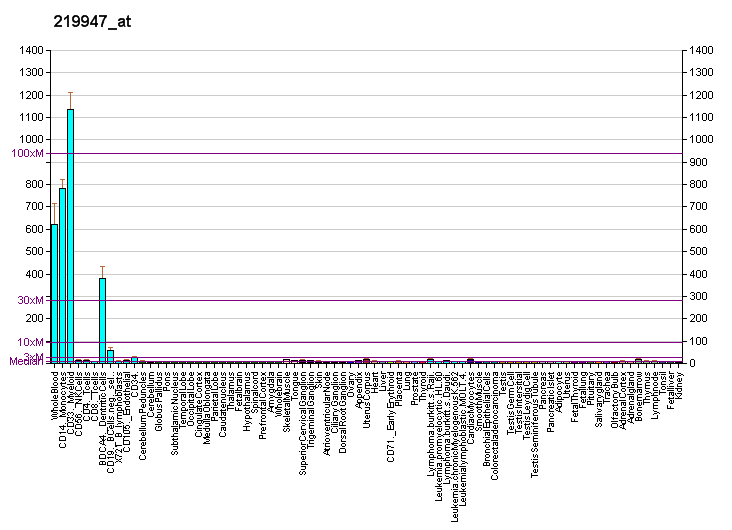

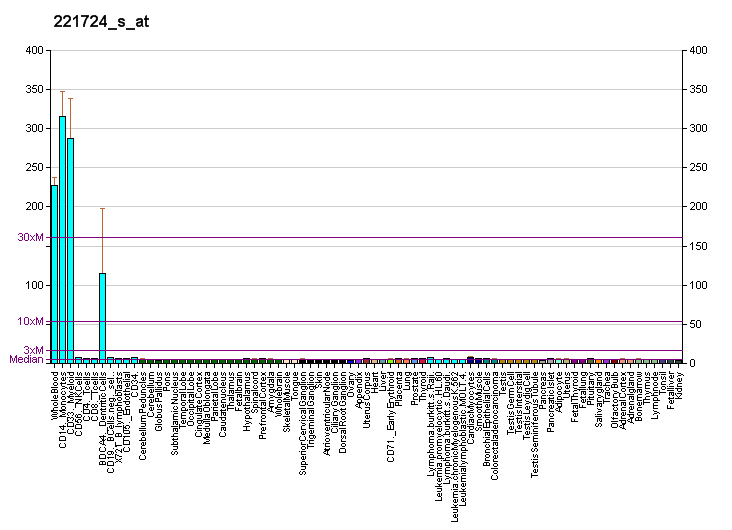
RNA expression pattern
Bgee	Human / Mouse (ortholog); Top expressed in: monocyte; granulocyte; blood; appendix; testicle; spleen; bone marrow; bone marrow cell; upper lobe of left lung; right lung / Top expressed in: granulocyte; stroma of bone marrow; tibiofemoral joint; spermatid; embryo; spleen; Paneth cell; submandibular gland; seminiferous tubule; blood; More reference expression data
BioGPS	More reference expression data
Gene ontology
Molecular function	transmembrane signaling receptor activity; carbohydrate binding; calcium ion binding; mannose binding; metal ion binding
Cellular component	integral component of membrane; plasma membrane; integral component of plasma membrane; membrane
Biological process	cell surface receptor signaling pathway; cell adhesion; stimulatory C-type lectin receptor signaling pathway; adaptive immune response; immune system process; innate immune response; negative regulation of cytokine production; plasmacytoid dendritic cell antigen processing and presentation; negative regulation of tumor necrosis factor production; CD8-positive, alpha-beta T cell activation; antigen processing and presentation of exogenous peptide antigen via MHC class I
Sources:Amigo / QuickGO
Orthologs
Databases	NCBI: entry; OMA: entry
Species	Human	Mouse
Entrez	50856	26888
Ensembl	ENSG00000111729	ENSMUSG00000030148
UniProt	Q9UMR7	Q9QZ15
RefSeq (mRNA)	NM_016184; NM_194447; NM_194448; NM_194450	NM_001170332; NM_001170333; NM_011999
RefSeq (protein)	NP_057268; NP_919429; NP_919430; NP_919432	NP_001163803; NP_001163804; NP_036129
Location (UCSC)	Chr 12: 8.12 – 8.14 Mb	Chr 6: 123.08 – 123.12 Mb
PubMed search
- Wikidata
View/Edit Human	View/Edit Mouse

C-type lectin domain family 4 member A is a protein that in humans is encoded by the CLEC4A gene.

This gene encodes a member of the C-type lectin/C-type lectin-like domain (CTL/CTLD) superfamily. Members of this family share a common protein fold and have diverse functions, such as cell adhesion, cell-cell signalling, glycoprotein turnover, and roles in inflammation and immune response. The encoded type 2 transmembrane protein may play a role in inflammatory and immune response.

Multiple transcript variants encoding distinct isoforms have been identified for this gene. This gene is closely linked to other CTL/CTLD superfamily members on chromosome 12p13 in the natural killer gene complex region.
