= CLEC9A =

Protein-coding gene in humans

Identifiers
- Aliases: CLEC9A, DNGR1, UNQ9341, CD370, DNGR-1, C-type lectin domain family 9 member A, C-type lectin domain containing 9A
- External IDs: OMIM: 612252; MGI: 2444608; GeneCards: CLEC9A
Available structures
PDB	Ortholog search: PDBe RCSB
PDB	List of PDB id codes 3VPP

Gene location (Human)
Chr.	Chromosome 12 (human)
Band	12p13.2	Start	10,030,678 bp
Band	12p13.2	End	10,066,031 bp

Gene location (Mouse)
Chr.	Chromosome 6 (mouse)
Band	6|6 F3	Start	129,385,825 bp
Band	6|6 F3	End	129,401,726 bp
RNA expression pattern
Bgee	Human / Mouse (ortholog); Top expressed in: testicle; gonad; lymph node; C1 segment; substantia nigra; monocyte; smooth muscle tissue; appendix; thymus; gallbladder / Top expressed in: spleen; lung; granulocyte; liver; ovary; embryo; bone marrow; thymus; ileum; jejunum; More reference expression data
BioGPS	n/a
Gene ontology
Molecular function	carbohydrate binding
Cellular component	integral component of membrane; membrane; cell surface
Biological process	endocytosis; receptor-mediated endocytosis
Sources:Amigo / QuickGO
Orthologs
Databases	NCBI: entry; OMA: entry
Species	Human	Mouse
Entrez	283420	232414
Ensembl	ENSG00000197992	ENSMUSG00000046080
UniProt	Q6UXN8	Q8BRU4
RefSeq (mRNA)	NM_207345	NM_001205363; NM_001205364; NM_001205365; NM_172732
RefSeq (protein)	NP_997228	NP_001192292; NP_001192293; NP_001192294; NP_766320
Location (UCSC)	Chr 12: 10.03 – 10.07 Mb	Chr 6: 129.39 – 129.4 Mb
PubMed search
- Wikidata
View/Edit Human	View/Edit Mouse

C-type lectin domain family 9 member A is a protein that in humans is encoded by the CLEC9A gene.

== Function ==
CLEC9A is a group V C-type lectin-like receptor (CTLR) that functions as an activation receptor and is expressed on myeloid lineage cells (Huysamen et al., 2008 [PubMed 18408006]).
