= Thrombomodulin =

Mammalian protein found in humans

THBD
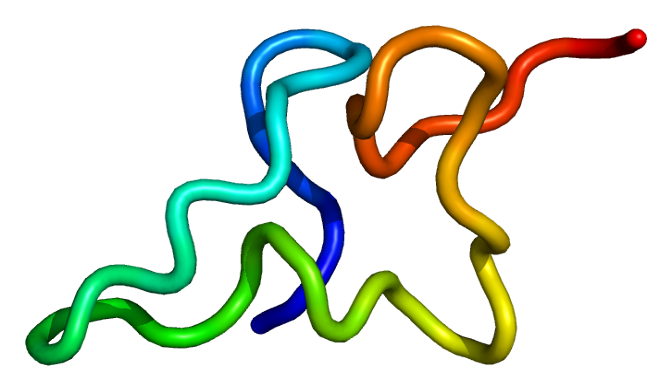

Identifiers
- Aliases: THBD, AHUS6, BDCA3, CD141, THPH12, THRM, TM, thrombomodulin, BDCA-3
- External IDs: OMIM: 188040; MGI: 98736; GeneCards: THBD
Available structures
| PDB | Ortholog search: PDBe RCSB |
| PDB | List of PDB id codes 1ADX, 1DQB, 1DX5, 1EGT, 1FGD, 1FGE, 1HLT, 1TMR, 1ZAQ, 2ADX, 3GIS |

Gene location (Human)
| Chr. | Chromosome 20 (human) |
| Band | 20p11.21 | Start | 23,045,633 bp |
| Band | 20p11.21 | End | 23,049,672 bp |

Gene location (Mouse)
| Chr. | Chromosome 2 (mouse) |
| Band | 2 G3|2 73.45 cM | Start | 148,246,386 bp |
| Band | 2 G3|2 73.45 cM | End | 148,250,108 bp |
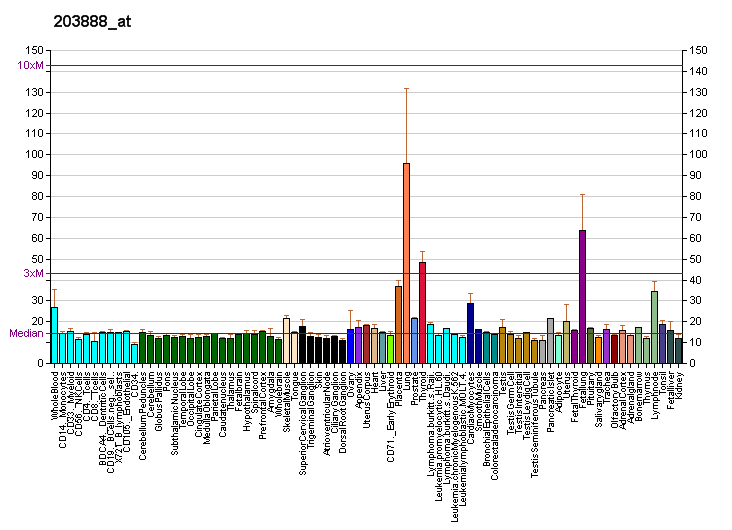

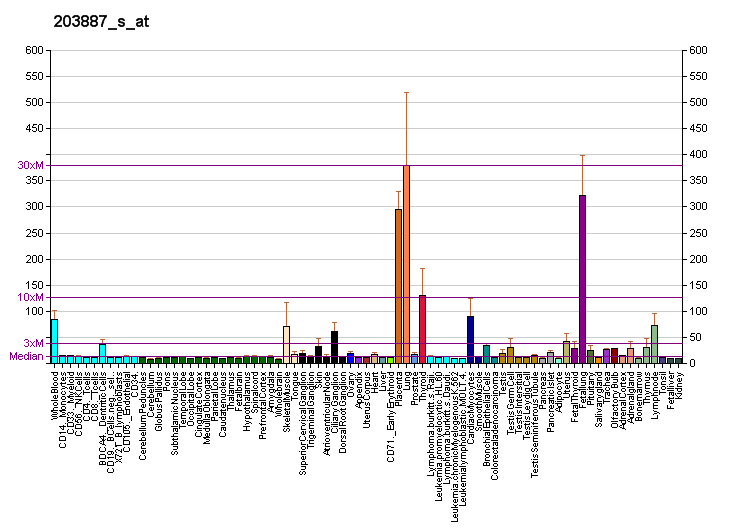
RNA expression pattern
| Bgee | Human / Mouse (ortholog); Top expressed in: gingival epithelium; vena cava; right lung; skin of hip; skin of abdomen; skin of thigh; periodontal fiber; lower lobe of lung; upper lobe of left lung; left coronary artery / Top expressed in: right lung lobe; left lung; left lung lobe; calvaria; Gonadal ridge; ankle; aortic valve; ascending aorta; white adipose tissue; decidua; More reference expression data |
| BioGPS | More reference expression data |
Gene ontology
| Molecular function | calcium ion binding; protein binding; transmembrane signaling receptor activity; signaling receptor activity |
| Cellular component | integral component of membrane; cell surface; plasma membrane; integral component of plasma membrane; membrane; apicolateral plasma membrane; vacuolar membrane; extracellular space |
| Biological process | hemostasis; female pregnancy; negative regulation of platelet activation; response to lipopolysaccharide; response to cAMP; negative regulation of fibrinolysis; blood coagulation; response to X-ray; signal transduction; negative regulation of blood coagulation; leukocyte migration |
Sources:Amigo / QuickGO
Orthologs
| Databases | NCBI: entry; OMA: entry |
| Species | Human | Mouse |
| Entrez | 7056 | 21824 |
| Ensembl | ENSG00000178726 | ENSMUSG00000074743 |
| UniProt | P07204 | P15306 |
| RefSeq (mRNA) | NM_000361 | NM_009378 |
| RefSeq (protein) | NP_000352 | NP_033404 |
| Location (UCSC) | Chr 20: 23.05 – 23.05 Mb | Chr 2: 148.25 – 148.25 Mb |
| PubMed search |
- Wikidata
| View/Edit Human | View/Edit Mouse |

Thrombomodulin (TM), CD141 or BDCA-3 is an integral membrane protein expressed on the surface of endothelial cells and serves as a cofactor for thrombin. It reduces blood coagulation by converting thrombin to an anticoagulant enzyme from a procoagulant enzyme. Thrombomodulin is also expressed on human mesothelial cell, monocyte and a dendritic cell subset.

== Genetics and structure ==
In humans, thrombomodulin is encoded by the THBD gene. The protein has a molecular mass of 74kDa, and consists of a single chain with six tandemly repeated EGF-like domains, a Serine/Threonine-rich spacer and a transmembrane domain. It is a member of the C-type lectin domain (CTLD) group 14 family.

== Function ==
Thrombomodulin functions as a cofactor in the thrombin-induced activation of protein C in the anticoagulant pathway by forming a 1:1 stoichiometric complex with thrombin. This raises the speed of protein C activation thousandfold. Thrombomodulin-bound thrombin has procoagulant effect at the same time by inhibiting fibrinolysis by cleaving thrombin-activatable fibrinolysis inhibitor (TAFI, aka carboxypeptidase B2) into its active form.

Thrombomodulin is a glycoprotein on the surface of endothelial cells that, in addition to binding thrombin, regulates C3b inactivation by factor I. Mutations in the thrombomodulin gene (THBD) have also been reported to be associated with atypical hemolytic-uremic syndrome (aHUS).

The antigen described as BDCA-3 has turned out to be identical to thrombomodulin. Thus, it was revealed that this molecule also occurs on a very rare (0.02%) subset of human dendritic cells called MDC2. Its function on these cells is unknown.

== Interactions ==
Thrombomodulin has been shown to interact with thrombin.
