= Outline of immunology =

Overview of and topical guide to immunology

The following outline is provided as an overview of and topical guide to immunology:

Immunology – study of all aspects of the immune system in all organisms. It deals with the physiological functioning of the immune system in states of both health and disease; malfunctions of the immune system in immunological disorders (autoimmune diseases, hypersensitivities, immune deficiency, transplant rejection); the physical, chemical and physiological characteristics of the components of the immune system in vitro, in situ, and in vivo.

== Essence of immunology ==
Immunology

- Branch of Biomedical science
- Immune system
- Immunity

Branches of immunology:

1. General Immunology
2. Basic Immunology
3. Advanced Immunology
4. Medical Immunology
5. Pharmaceutical Immunology
6. Clinical Immunology
7. Environmental Immunology
8. Cellular and Molecular Immunology
9. Food and Agricultural Immunology

- Classical immunology
- Clinical immunology
- Computational immunology
- Diagnostic immunology
- Evolutionary immunology
- Systems immunology
- Immunomics
- Immunoproteomics
- Immunophysics
- Immunochemistry
- Ecoimmunology
- Immunopathology
- Nutritional immunology
- Psychoneuroimmunology
- Reproductive immunology
- Circadian immunology
- Immunotoxicology
- Palaeoimmunology
- Tissue-based immunology

- Testicular immunology - Testes
- Immunodermatology - Skin
- Intravascular immunology - Blood
- Osteoimmunology - Bone
- Mucosal immunology - Mucosal surfaces

- Respiratory tract antimicrobial defense system - Respiratory tract

- Neuroimmunology - Neuroimmune system in the Central nervous system
- Ocularimmunology - Ocular immune system in the Eye
- Cancer immunology/Immunooncology - Tumors

== History of immunology ==
History of immunology

- Timeline of immunology

== General immunological concepts ==
- Immunity:

- Immunity against:

- Pathogens
  - Pathogenic bacteria
  - Viruses
  - Fungi
  - Protozoa
- Parasites
- Tumors
- Allergens
- Self-proteins

- Autoimmunity
- Alloimmunity
- Cross-reactivity

- Tolerance

- Central tolerance
- Peripheral tolerance
- Clonal anergy
- Clonal deletion
- Tolerance in pregnancy
- Immunodeficiency

- Antigen

- Antigenicity
- Immunogen
- Superantigen
- Allergen
- Hapten
- Epitope

- Linear
- Conformational
- Mimotope

- Tumor antigen
- Antigen-antibody interaction

- Immunogenetics

- Affinity maturation

- Somatic hypermutation
- Clonal selection

- V(D)J recombination

- Artemis complex
- Recombination-activating gene

- RAG1
- RAG2

- Recombination signal sequences

- Junctional diversity
- Immunoglobulin class switching
- Allelic exclusion
- Polyclonal response

- Phagocytosis

- Opsonin

- Intrinsic immunity
- Leukocyte extravasation
- Cross-presentation
- Immune repertoire
- Original antigenic sin
- Antigen presentation
- Immunological synapse
- Co-stimulation

== Components of the immune system ==
Immune system

=== Adaptive immune system ===
Adaptive immune system

- Humoral immunity

- Antibodies

- Kinds of antibodies

- Monoclonal antibodies
- Polyclonal antibodies
- Autoantibody
- Microantibody
- Neutralizing antibody

- Classification

- Allotype
- Isotype
- Idiotype

- Functions

- Antibody opsonization
- Neutralisation

- Regions

- Paratope
- Complementarity-determining region (CDRs)
- Hypervariable region
- Framework region
- Fab Region
- Fc Region

- Polyclonal B cell response

- Cell-mediated immunity

=== Innate immune system ===
Innate immune system

- Complement system

- Classical complement pathway
- Mannan-binding lectin pathway
- Alternate complement pathway
- Complement membrane attack complex

- Surface barriers – Physical or chemical barriers that prevent infection (i.e. skin, tears, mucus, saliva, Gastric acid, etc.)

- Antimicrobial peptides
- Defensins
- Lysozyme

- Inflammation

- Inflammatory reflex
- Inflammasome
- Granuloma
- Acute-phase proteins

- Amyloid

- SAP
- SAA

- Positive

- Alpha 1-antichymotrypsin
- Alpha 1-antitrypsin
- Alpha 2-macroglobulin
- C-reactive protein
- Ceruloplasmin
- C3
- Ferritin
- Fibrin
- Haptoglobin
- Hemopexin
- Orosomucoid

- Negative

- Serum albumin
- Transferrin

== Organs of the immune system ==
Lymphatic system

=== Primary lymphoid organs ===
Primary lymphoid organs

- Thymus - Site of T cell maturation
- Bone marrow - Site of haematopoiesis and B cell maturation

=== Secondary lymphoid organs ===
Secondary lymphoid organs

- Spleen
  - White pulp
  - Red pulp
  - Marginal zone
- Lymph nodes
- Mucosa-associated lymphoid tissue

- Gut-associated lymphoid tissue
- Bronchus-associated lymphoid tissue

== Cells of the immune system ==
White blood cells

=== Myeloid cells ===
- Granulocytes
  - Neutrophils
  - Eosinophils
  - Basophils
  - Mast cells
- Monocytes
- Macrophages

- Histiocytes (Tissue resident macrophages)

- Adipose tissue macrophages
- Kupffer cell - Liver
- Alveolar macrophage (Dust cell) - Lung
- Langerhans cell - Skin
- Dermal macrophage - Dermis
- Microglia - CNS
- Perivascular macrophage
- Meningeal macrophage - Meninges
- Hofbauer cell - Placenta
- Osteoclasts - Bone
- Bone marrow macrophage - Bone marrow
- Marginal zone macrophage - Spleen
- Metallophilic macrophage - Spleen
- Red pulp macrophage - Splenic red pulp
- Tingible body macrophage (White pulp macrophage) - Splenic white pulp

- Giant cells

- Foreign-body giant cell
- Langhans giant cell
- Touton giant cells

- Epithelioid cells
- Bone marrow-derived macrophages - Generated in vitro

- Dendritic Cells

- Conventional Dendritic Cells
- Plasmacytoid dendritic cells

=== Lymphoid cells ===
Lymphoid cells

- B cells
  - Plasma B cells
  - Memory B cells
  - B-1 cells
  - B-2 cells (the conventional B cells most texts refer to)
  - Marginal-zone B cells
  - Follicular B cells
- T cells
  - Naive T cells
  - Helper T cells - Commonly termed CD4+ T cells
    - Th1 cells
    - Th2 cells
    - Th3 cells
    - Th17 cells
    - T_{FH} cells - Follicular helper T cells
  - Cytotoxic T cells - Commonly termed CD8+ T cells
  - Memory T cells
  - Regulatory T cells
  - Natural Killer T cells (NKT cells)
  - γδ T cells
  - Mucosal associated invariant T cells
- Innate lymphoid cells (ILC)
  - Group 1 ILC
    - Natural killer cells (NK cells)
  - Group 2 ILC
    - Nuocyte
  - Group 3 ILC
    - Lymphoid Tissue inducer cells (LTi cells)

=== Others ===
(Non-hematopoietic cells with immune functions)
- Stromal cells

- Lymph node stromal cells
- Follicular dendritic cells

- Epithelial cells
- Pericytes
- Microfold cells (M cells)

=== Hematopoiesis ===
- Lymphopoiesis

- Lymphoblast
- Prolymphocyte

- T cell development

- Thymocyte

- B cell development

- Pre-pro-B cell
- Early pro-B cell
- Late pro-B cell
- Large pre-B cell
- Small pre-B cell
- Immature B cell

- Myelopoiesis

- Common myeloid progenitor (CFU-GEMM)

- Granulocyte-macrophage progenitor (CFU-GM)

- Granulopoiesis

- Myeloblast (CFU-G)
- Promyelocyte
- Myelocyte
- Metamyelocyte
- Band cell

- Monocytopoiesis

- Monoblast (CFU-M)

- CFU-DL - Dendritic cell / Langerhans cell precursor

- Promonocyte

- CFU-Baso (Basophil precursor)
- CFU-Eos (Eosinophil precursor)
- Megakaryocyte-erythroid progenitor cell (MEP)

- Megakaryocytopoiesis

- CFU-Meg
- Megakaryoblast
- Promegakaryocyte
- Megakaryocyte
- Thrombopoiesis

- Thrombocyte (Platelets)

- Erythropoiesis

- Proerythroblast
- Normoblast
- Reticulocyte

- CFU-Mast

- Mast cell precursors

== Molecules of the immune system ==
=== Immune receptors ===
==== Antigen receptors ====
- B cells

- Antigen receptor - B cell receptor (BCR)
- Subunits- Immunoglobulin heavy chain / Immunoglobulin light chain
- Co-receptors

- Stimulatory

- CD21
- CD19
- CD81

- Inhibitory

- CD22

- Accessory molecule (CD79)

- Ig-α (CD79A)
- Ig-β (CD79B)

- T cells

- Antigen receptor - T cell receptor (TCR)

- Subunits - TRA@ / TRB@ / TRD@ / TRG@

- Co-receptors

- CD8 (CD8α / CD8β)
- CD4

- Accessory molecules

- CD3

- Subunits - one CD3γ / one CD3δ / two CD3ε

- ζ-chain (CD247, CD3ζ, TCRζ)

==== Pattern recognition receptors (PRRs) ====
Pattern recognition receptor

- Membrane-bound PRRs

- Toll-like receptors (TLRs)

- TLR1
- TLR2
- TLR3
- TLR4
- TLR5
- TLR6
- TLR7
- TLR8
- TLR9
- TLR10
- TLR11
- TLR12
- TLR13

- C-type lectin receptors (CLRs)

- Group 1 CLRs - Mannose receptors

- MRC1
- MRC2
- DEC205 (CD205)

- Group 2 CLRs - Asialoglycoprotein receptor family

- DC-SIGN (CD209)
- Langerin (CD207)
- CLEC10A (CD301, MGL)
- CLEC5A (MDL1)

- Dectin 1 subfamily

- Dectin 1 (CLEC7A)
- MICL (CLEC12A)
- CLEC2
- DNGR1 (CLEC9A)

- DCIR subfamily

- Dectin 2 (CLEC6A)
- BDCA2 (CD303)
- Mincle (CLEC4E)
- DCIR (CLEC4A)

- Scavenger receptors

- Class A - Trimers

- MSR1 (SCARA1)
- MARCO (SCARA2)
- SCARA3
- SCARA4 (COLEC12)
- SCARA5

- Class B - Two transmembrane domains

- SCARB1
- SCARB2
- CD36 (SCARB3)

- Others

- CD68
- LOX-1

- Formyl peptide receptors (FPRs)

- FPR1
- FPR2
- FPR3

- Cytoplasmic PRRs

- NOD-like receptors (NLRs)

- NLRA (A for acidic transactivating domain)

- CIITA

- NLRB (B for BIR, or Inhibitor of apoptosis domain)

- NAIP

- NLRC (C for CARD domain)

- NOD1
- NOD2
- NLRC3
- NLRC4 (IPAF)
- NLRC5

- NLRP (P for Pyrin domain)

- NLRP1
- NLRP2
- NLRP3
- NLRP4
- NLRP5
- NLRP6
- NLRP7
- NLRP8
- NLRP9
- NLRP10
- NLRP11
- NLRP12
- NLRP13
- NLRP14

- NLRX

- NLRX1

- RIG-I-like receptors (RLRs) - Intracellular sensors of viral replication by direct interaction with dsRNA

- RIG-I
- MDA5
- LGP2

- Secreted PRRs

- Complement system (see complement proteins section)
- Collectins

- Mannan-binding lectin (MBL)
- Surfactant protein A (SP-A)
- Surfactant protein D (SP-D)
- CL-L1
- CL-P1
- CL-K1

- Peptidoglycan recognition proteins (PGRPs)

- PGLYRP1
- PGLYRP2
- PGLYRP3
- PGLYRP4

- Ficolins

- FCN1
- FCN2
- FCN3

==== Complement receptors ====
Complement receptor

- CR1 (CD35)
- CR2 (CD21)
- CR3 - Heterodimer: CD11b / CD18
- CR4 - Heterodimer: CD11c / CD18
- CRIg (Complement receptor of the immunoglobulin family)
- Anaphylatoxin receptors

- C3a receptor
- C5a receptor (CD88)
- C5AR2

==== Fc receptors ====
Fc receptor

- Fc-gamma receptors (FcγR)

- FcγRI (CD64)
- FcγRIIA (CD32A)
- FcγRIIB (CD32B)
- FcγRIIIA (CD16a)
- FcγRIIIB (CD16b)
- FcγRT (Neonatal Fc receptor)

- Fc-alpha receptors (FcαR)

- FcαRI (CD89, FCAR)
- Fcα/μR

- Fc-epsilon receptors (FcεR)

- FcεRI - Tetramer: FCER1A / FCER1B / two FCER1G
- FcεRII (CD23)

- Secreted Fc receptors

- Polymeric immunoglobulin receptor (poly-Ig)

- Fc receptor-like molecules

- FCRL1
- FCRL2
- FCRL3
- FCRL4
- FCRL5
- FCRL6
- FCRLA
- FCRLB

==== Cytokine receptors ====
Cytokine receptor

- Type I cytokine receptors (Hemopoietin receptors) - Share extracellular WSXWS motif, Grouped by common receptor subunits

- Common gamma chain (γ-chain, CD132)

- IL2R - Heterotrimer: IL2RA (CD25) / IL2RB (CD122) / γ_{c}
- IL4R / IL13R - Heterodimer: IL4RA / (IL13RA1/IL13RA2)
- IL7R - Heterodimer: IL7RA (CD127) / γ-chain
- IL9R - Heterodimer: IL9R / γ-chain
- IL15R - Heterotrimer: IL15RA / IL2RB / γ-chain
- IL21R - Heterodimer: IL21R / γ-chain

- Common beta chain (β-chain, CD131)

- IL3R - Heterodimer: IL3RA / β-chain
- IL5R - Heterodimer: IL5RA / β-chain
- GM-CSFR (CD116) - Heterdimer: GM-CSFRA / β-chain

- Common gp130 subunit (gp130, CD130)

- IL6R - Heterodimer: IL6RA / gp130
- IL11R - Heterodimer: IL11RA / gp130
- IL27R - Heterodimer: IL27RA / gp130
- OSMR - Heterodimer: OSMR / gp130
- LIFR (CD118) - Heterodimer: LIFR / gp130

- IL12 receptor beta 1 subunit (IL12RB1)

- IL12R - Heterodimer: IL12RB1 / IL12RB2
- IL23R - Heterodimer: IL23RA / IL12RB1

- Others

- EPOR (Erythropoietin receptor) - Homodimer
- G-CSFR (CD114) - Homodimer upon ligand binding
- MPL (CD110, Thrombopoietin receptor) - Homodimer upon ligand binding
- GHR (Growth hormone receptor) - Homodimer upon ligand binding
- PRLR (Prolactin receptor)

- Type II cytokine receptor - Lack WSXWS motif

- Interferon receptors

- Interferon-α/β receptor (IFNAR) - Heterodimer: IFNAR1 / IFNAR2
- Interferon-γ receptor (IFNGR) - Heterodimer: IFNGR1 / IFNGR2

- Interleukin receptors

- IL10R - Heterodimer: IL10RA / IL10RB
- IL20R - Heterodimer: IL20RA / IL20RB
- IL22R - Heterodimer: IL22RA1 / IL10RB
- IL28R - Heterodimer: IL28RA / IL10RB

- Immunoglobulin superfamily (Some members)

- CSF1
- CD117 (c-KIT)
- IL1 receptor family (IL1R)

- IL1R type 1 (CD121a)
- IL1R type 2 (CD121b)
- IL1R accessory protein (IL1RAP)
- IL1RL1 (IL33R, ST2)

- IL18R - Heterodimer: IL18R1 / IL18RAP

- IL17 family

- IL17RA
- IL17RB
- IL17RC
- IL17RD
- IL17RE

- Tumor necrosis factor (TNF) receptor family - Trimeric cytokine receptors

- TNFRSF1A (CD120a)
- TNFRSF1B (CD120b)
- TNFRSF3 (Lymphotoxin βR)
- TNFRSF4 (CD134, OX40)
- TNFRSF5 (CD40)
- TNFRSF6 (FAS)

- TNFRSF6B
- TNFRSF7 (CD27)
- TNFRSF8 (CD30)
- TNFRSF9 (CD137)
- TNFRSF10A (CD261)
- TNFRSF10B (CD262)

- TNFRSF10C (CD263)
- TNFRSF10D (CD264)
- TNFRSF11A (CD265, RANK)
- TNFRSF11B (Osteoprotegerin)
- TNFRSF12A (CD266)
- TNFRSF13B (CD267)

- TNFRSF13C
- TNFRSF14 (CD268)
- TNFRSF16 (LNGRF)
- TNFRSF17 (CD269)
- TNFRSF18
- TNFRSF19

- TNFRSF21
- TNFRSF25
- TNFRSF27

- Chemokine receptors - 7-transmembrane G protein-coupled receptors

- CC chemokine receptors (CCRs)

- CCR1
- CCR2

- CCR3
- CCR4

- CCR5
- CCR6

- CCR7
- CCR8

- CCR9
- CCR10

- CXC chemokine receptors (CXCRs)

- CXCR1
- CXCR2

- CXCR3
- CXCR4

- CXCR5

- CXCR6

- CXCR7

- C chemokine receptors (XCRs)

- XCR1

- CX_{3}C chemokine receptors (CX_{3}CRs)

- CX_{3}CR1 (Fractalkine receptor)

- TGF beta receptors - Single transmembrane pass serine/threonine kinase receptors

- TGFBR1
- TGFBR2
- TGFBR3

==== Natural killer cell receptors ====
Natural killer cell receptors

- Killer activation receptors (KARs)

- Natural cytotoxicity receptors (NCRs)

- NCR1
- NCR2
- NCR3

- Natural killer group 2 receptors (NKG2s)

- NKG2A
- NKG2B
- NKG2C
- NKG2D
- NKG2E
- NKG2H

- Activating KIRs

- KIR2DS1

- Killer inhibitory receptors (KIRs)

- Two domains, long cytoplasmic tail

- KIR2DL1
- KIR2DL2
- KIR2DL3
- KIR2DL4
- KIR2DL5A
- KIR2DL5B

- Two domains, short cytoplasmic tail

- KIR2DS1
- KIR2DS2
- KIR2DS3
- KIR2DS4
- KIR2DS5

- Three domains, long cytoplasmic tail

- KIR3DL1
- KIR3DL2
- KIR3DL3

- Three domains, short cytoplasmic tail

- KIR3DS1

==== Others ====
- Leukocyte immunoglobulin-like receptors (LILRs)

- LILR subfamily A

- LILRA1
- LILRA2
- LILRA3
- LILRA4
- LILRA5
- LILRA6

- LILR subfamily B

- LILRB1
- LILRB2
- LILRB3
- LILRB4
- LILRB5

- Eicosanoid receptors

=== Antibodies ===
Antibodies

- Immunoglobulin A (IgA)
  - IgA1
  - IgA2
- Immunoglobulin D (IgD)
- Immunoglobulin E (IgE)
- Immunoglobulin G (IgG)
  - IgG1
  - IgG2
  - IgG3
  - IgG4
- Immunoglobulin M (IgM)

=== Cytokines ===
Cytokine

- Chemokines

- CC chemokines

- CCL1
- CCL2
- CCL3
- CCL4
- CCL5
- CCL6

- CCL7
- CCL8
- CCL9/CCL10
- CCL11
- CCL12
- CCL13

- CCL14
- CCL15
- CCL16
- CCL17
- CCL18

- CCL19
- CCL20
- CCL21
- CCL22
- CCL23

- CCL24
- CCL25
- CCL26
- CCL27
- CCL28

- CXC chemokines

- CXCL1
- CXCL2
- CXCL3
- CXCL4

- CXCL5
- CXCL6
- CXCL7
- CXCL8

- CXCL9
- CXCL10
- CXCL11

- CXCL12
- CXCL13
- CXCL14

- CXCL15
- CXCL16
- CXCL17

- C chemokines

- XCL1
- XCL2

- CX_{3}C chemokines

- CX_{3}CL1 (Fractalkine, Neurotactin)

- Interferons
  - Interferon type I
    - IFN-α
    - IFN-β
    - IFN-ω
  - Interferon type II
    - IFN-γ
- Interleukins

- IL1A
- IL1B
- IL1RA
- IL2
- IL3
- IL4
- IL5
- IL6
- IL7
- IL8

- IL9
- IL10
- IL11
- IL12
- IL13
- IL14
- IL15
- IL16
- IL17A
- IL17F

- IL18
- IL19
- IL20
- IL21
- IL22
- IL23
- IL24
- IL25
- IL26

- IL27
- IL28A
- IL28B
- IL29
- IL30
- IL31
- IL32
- IL33
- IL34

- IL35
- IL36A
- IL36B
- IL36G
- IL36RA
- IL37
- TSLP
- LIF (Leukemia inhibitory factor)
- OSM (Oncostatin M)

- Tumor necrosis factors

- TNFA
- TNFB (Lymphotoxin-α)
- TNFC (Lymphotoxin-β)
- TNFSF4 (OX40L)

- TNFSF5 (CD40L)
- TNFSF6 (FasL)
- TNFSF7 (CD70, CD27L)
- TNFSF8 (CD153, CD30L)

- TNFSF9 (4-1BBL)
- TNFSF10 (TRAIL)
- TNFSF11 (RANK-L, OPG-L)
- TNFSF12 (TWEAK)

- TNFSF13 (APRIL, CD256)
- TNFSF13B (BAFF, CD257)
- TNFSF14 (LIGHT, CD258)

- TNFSF15 (VEGI)
- TNFSF18
- EDA

- Colony stimulating factors

- CSF1 (M-CSF)
- CSF2 (GM-CSF)
- CSF3 (G-CSF)

=== MHCs ===
Major histocompatibility complex

- MHC class I
- HLA-A
- HLA-B
- HLA-C
- HLA-E
- HLA-F
- HLA-G
- MHC class II
- HLA-DM
  - α
  - β
- HLA-DO
  - α
  - β
- HLA-DP
  - α1
  - β1
- HLA-DQ
  - α1
  - α2
  - β1
  - β2
  - β3
- HLA-DR
  - α
  - β1
  - β3
  - β4
  - β5

=== Complement proteins ===
- Early stage (divided by pathway)

- Classical complement pathway

- C1Q complex - C1R / C1S
- C4 - C4a
- C2

- Mannan-binding lectin pathway

- MASP1 / MASP2
- Mannan-binding lectin

- Alternative complement pathway

- Factor B
- Factor D
- Factor P (Properdin)

- Middle stage

- C3 - C3a / C3b / iC3b
- C5 - C5a
- C3-convertase
- C5-convertase

- Late stage

- Membrane attack complex (MAC)

- C6
- C7
- C8
- C9

- Complement pathway inhibitors

- C1-inhibitor - Classical, Lectin, Alternate
- Decay-accelerating factor (CD59) - Classical, Lectin, Alternate
- Factor I - Classical, Lectin, Alternate
- C4BP - Classical, Lectin
- Factor H - Alternate

=== Antimicrobial peptides ===
Antimicrobial peptides

=== Transcription factors ===
- NF-κB
- AP-1
- Interferon regulatory factors (IRF)
- NFAT
- NFATc1
- NFATc2
- NFATc3
- NFATc4
- NFAT5
- T-bet - T_{H}1 differentiation
- GATA3 - T_{H}2 differentiation
- RORγT - T_{H}17 differentiation
- BCL6 - T_{FH} differentiation
- FoxP3 - T_{reg} differentiation

=== Signaling pathways ===
- JAK-STAT signaling pathway
- TGF beta signaling pathway
- TLR signalling pathway

=== Cell adhesion molecules (CAMs) ===
Cell adhesion molecules

- Integrins - Obligate heterodimers of one alpha and one beta subunits

- Alpha subunits

- A1
- A2
- A3
- A4
- A5
- A6
- A7
- A8
- A9
- A10
- A11
- AD
- AE
- AL (CD11a)
- AM (CD11b)
- AV
- AX (CD11c)

- Beta subunits

- B1
- B2
- B3
- B4
- B5
- B6
- B7
- B8

- Dimers

- Cytoadhesin receptor

- Integrin alpha6beta4
- Glycoprotein IIb/IIIa - Heterodimer: ITGA2B / ITGB3

- Fibrinogen receptor

- Macrophage-1 antigen (CR3) - Heterodimer: CD11b / CD18

- Fibronectin receptor:

- Integrin alpha2beta1
- Integrin alpha4beta1
- Integrin alpha5beta1

- Leukocyte-adhesion receptor:

- LFA-1 - Heterodimer: CD11a / CD18
- Macrophage-1 antigen (CR3) - Heterodimer: CD11b / CD18
- Integrin alphaXbeta2 (CR4) - Heterodimer: CD11c / CD18

- Very late antigen receptor:

- Integrin alpha1beta1
- Integrin alpha2beta1
- Integrin alpha3beta1
- VLA-4 - Heterodimer: CD49d / CD29
- Alpha-5 beta-1
- Integrin alpha6beta1

- Vitronectin receptor:

- Alpha-v beta-3
- Alpha-v beta-5

- Immunoglobulin superfamily CAMs

- SynCAMs - Synaptic cell adhesion molecules
- NCAMs - Neural cell adhesion molecules
- Intercellular adhesion molecules (ICAMs)

- ICAM-1
- ICAM2
- ICAM3
- ICAM4
- ICAM5

- VCAM-1 (CD106)
- PECAM-1 (CD31)
- L1 family

- L1-CAM
- CHL1
- Neurofascin
- NrCAM

- SIGLEC family - Sialic acid binding lectins

- SIGLEC1 (Sialoadhesin)
- SIGLEC2 (CD22)
- SIGLEC3 (CD33)
- SIGLEC4 (MAG)
- SIGLEC5
- SIGLEC6
- SIGLEC7
- SIGLEC8
- SIGLEC9
- SIGLEC10
- SIGLEC11
- SIGLEC12
- SIGLEC14
- SIGLEC15

- CTX family

- CTX
- Junctional adhesion molecule
- BT-IGSF
- CAR
- VSIG
- ESAM

- Nectins

- PVRL1
- PVRL2
- PVRL3
- Nectin-4
- CADM1
- CADM3
- NECL3
- NECL4
- NECL5

- CD2 family

- CD2
- CD58
- Signaling lymphocytic activation molecules (SLAMs)

- SLAMF1 (CD150)
- SLAMF2 (CD48)
- SLAMF3 (CD229, LY9)
- SLAMF4 (CD244)
- SLAMF5 (CD84)
- SLAMF6 (CD352)
- SLAMF7 (CD319)
- SLAMF8 (CD353)
- SLAMF9
- Cadherins
- Selectins

- E-selectin
- L-selectin
- P-selectin

- Others

- Lymphocyte homing receptors

- CD34
- GLYCAM-1
- Addressin (MAdCAM-1)

- CD44
- Carcinoembryonic antigens

- CEACAM1
- CEACAM3
- CEACAM4
- CEACAM5
- CEACAM6
- CEACAM7
- CEACAM8
- CEACAM16
- CEACAM18
- CEACAM19
- CEACAM20
- CEACAM21

- CD24
- CD44
- CD146
- CD164

=== Others ===
- CD69
- Sphingosine-1-phosphate receptors
- S1PR1
- S1PR2
- S1PR3
- S1PR4
- S1PR5
- Co-stimulatory molecules

- CD80 - Expressed by APCs
- CD86 - Expressed by APCs
- CD28 family receptors

- CD28 - Expressed by T Cells
- CD278 (ICOS) - Homodimer, expressed by T Cells
- CTLA-4 (CD152)
- PD-1 (CD279)

== Immune system disorders ==
Immune disorder

=== Hypersensitivity and Allergy ===
- Type 1 hypersensitivity / Allergy / Atopy

- Foreign (Allergen)

- Atopic eczema
- Allergic urticaria
- Allergic rhinitis (Hay fever)
- Allergic asthma
- Anaphylaxis
- Food allergy

- Milk allergy
- Egg allergy
- Peanut allergy
- Tree nut allergy
- Seafood allergy
- Soy allergy
- Wheat allergy
- Garlic allergy

- Penicillin allergy

- Type 2 hypersensitivity / Antibody-dependent cell-mediated cytotoxicity (ADCC)

- Foreign

- Pernicious anemia
- Hemolytic disease of the newborn

- Autoimmune

- Cytotoxic

- Autoimmune hemolytic anemia
- Idiopathic thrombocytopenic purpura
- Bullous pemphigoid
- Pemphigus vulgaris
- Rheumatic fever
- Goodpasture's syndrome

- Type 5 / Receptor mediated

- Graves' disease
- Myasthenia gravis

- Type 3 hypersensitivity / Immune complex

- Foreign

- Henoch–Schönlein purpura
- Hypersensitivity vasculitis
- Reactive arthritis
- Farmer's lung
- Post-streptococcal glomerulonephritis
- Serum sickness
- Arthus reaction

- Autoimmune

- Systemic lupus erythematosus
- Subacute bacterial endocarditis
- Rheumatoid arthritis

- Type 4 hypersensitivity (Delayed-Type Hypersensitivity)

- Foreign

- Allergic contact dermatitis
- Mantoux test

- Autoimmune

- Diabetes mellitus type 1
- Hashimoto's thyroiditis
- Guillain–Barré syndrome
- Multiple sclerosis
- Coeliac disease
- Giant-cell arteritis

- GVHD (Graft-versus-host disease)

- Transfusion-associated graft versus host disease

- Unknown/Multiple types

- Foreign

- Hypersensitivity pneumonitis
- Allergic bronchopulmonary aspergillosis
- Transplant rejection
- Latex allergy (I+IV)

- Autoimmune

- Sjögren's syndrome
- Autoimmune hepatitis
- Autoimmune polyendocrine syndrome (APS1 / APS2)
- Autoimmune adrenalitis
- Systemic autoimmune disease

=== Immunodeficiency ===
Immunodeficiency

- Primary immunodeficiency
- Acquired immunodeficiency
- Complement deficiency

=== Cancers of the immune system ===
}}

=== Inflammatory diseases ===
- Sepsis
- Inflammatory bowel disease (IBD)
- Cytokine storm

=== Immunoproliferative immunoglobulin disorders ===
Immunoproliferative immunoglobulin disorders

== Immunologic techniques and tests ==
- Flow cytometry
- Mass cytometry
- Histology
- Adoptive cell transfer
- Experiments in immunology
- Genetically modified mouse
- Immunofluorescence
- Immunofixation
- Immunoadsorption
- MHC multimer
- Hybridoma technology

- Rabbit hybridoma
- Developmental studies hybridoma bank

== Immunology and health ==
- Prevention
- Immunostimulants
- Immunotherapy

- Activation immunotherapy

- Cancer immunotherapy
- Autologous immune enhancement therapy

- Immunosuppression

- Sublingual immunotherapy
- Allergen immunotherapy
- Immunosuppressive drug

- Artificial induction of immunity
- Immunization

- Active immunotherapy
- Passive immunity

- Temporarily induced immunity
- Adoptive immunity

- Vaccination

- Vaccine-naive
- Vaccine
- Herd immunity
- Adjuvant

- Organ transplantation

- Allotransplant
- Transplant rejection

== Immunologists ==
List of immunologists

== Immunology lists ==
- List of autoimmune diseases
- List of immunologists
- List of viruses
- List of human clusters of differentiation
- List of vaccine ingredients
- List of allergens
- List of cytokines
- List of cytokine receptors
- List of pattern recognition receptors
- List of tissue-resident macrophages
- List of branches of immunology
- List of acute-phase proteins
- List of immune cells
