= Il-30 =

IL30 or IL-30 may be:

- Ilyushin Il-30, a Cold War-era Soviet ground attack aircraft
- Interleukin 30, a cytokine that forms a portion of interleukin 27
- Illinois Route 30, the former name of Illinois Route 91
