= Fragment antigen-binding region =

Part of an antibody that binds to antigens

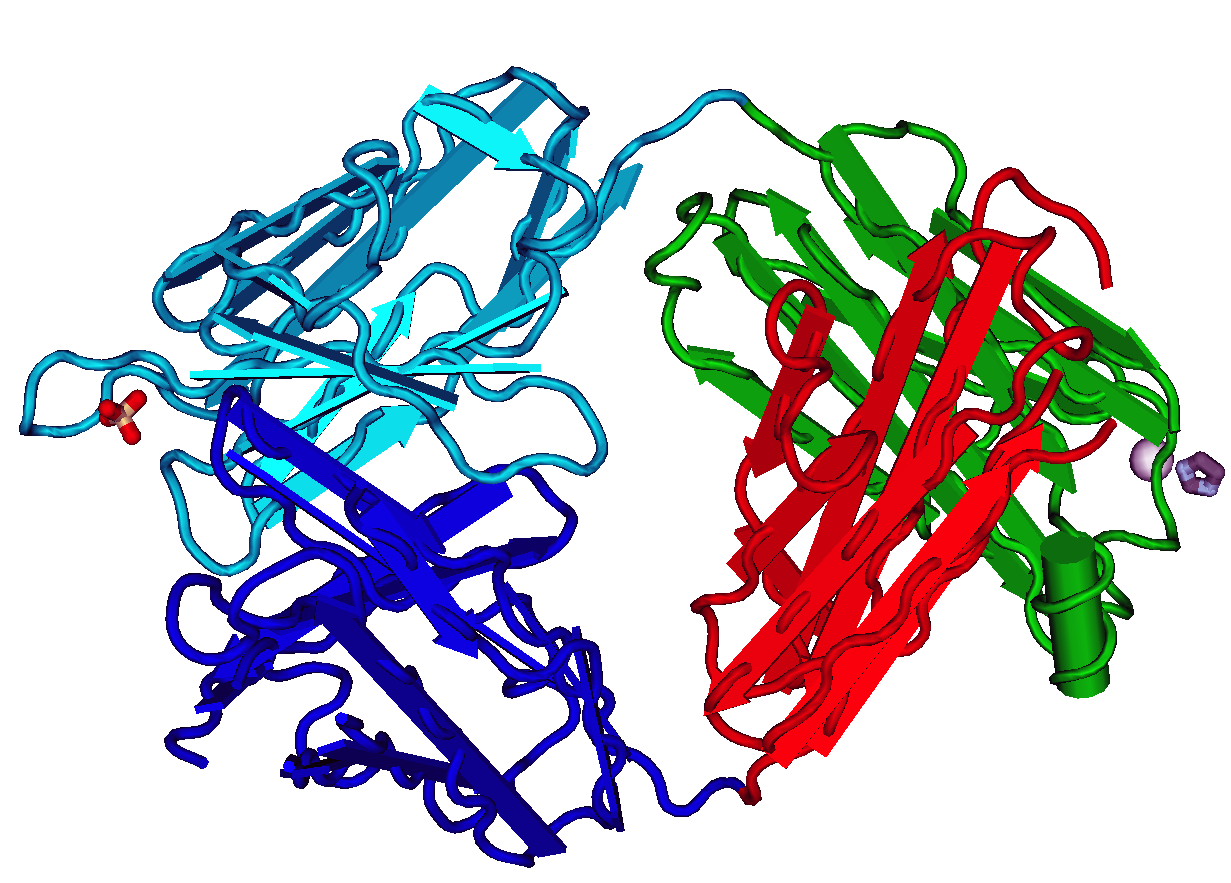
Structure of a Fab with light and heavy chains.

The fragment antigen-binding region (Fab region) is a region on an antibody that binds to antigens. It is composed of one constant and one variable domain of each of the heavy and the light chain. The variable domain contains the paratope (the antigen-binding site), comprising a set of complementarity-determining regions, at the amino terminal end of the monomer. Each arm of the Y thus binds an epitope on the antigen.

== Preparation ==
In an experimental setting, Fc and Fab fragments can be generated in the laboratory. The enzyme papain can be used to cleave an immunoglobulin monomer into two Fab fragments and an Fc fragment. Conversely, the enzyme pepsin cleaves below the hinge region, so the result instead is a F(ab')_{2} fragment and a pFc' fragment. Recently another enzyme for generation of F(ab')_{2} has been commercially available. The enzyme IdeS (Immunoglobulin degrading enzyme from Streptococcus pyogenes, trade name FabRICATOR) cleaves IgG in a sequence specific manner at neutral pH. The F(ab')_{2} fragment can be split into two Fab' fragments by mild reduction.

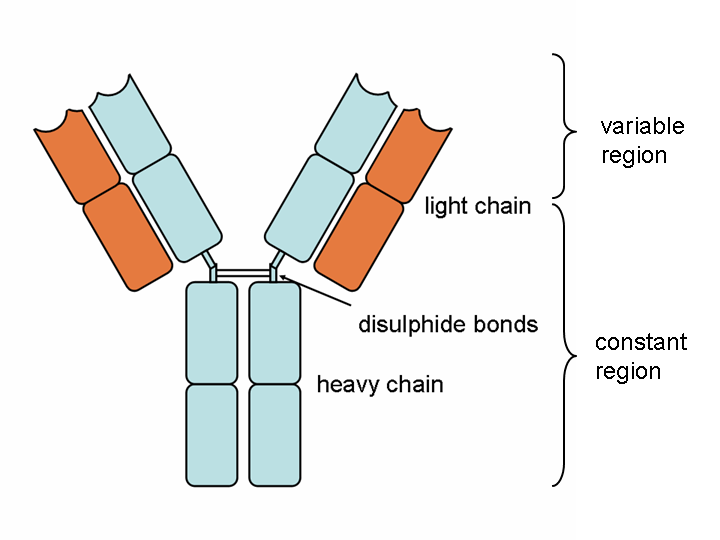
Heavy and light chains, variable and constant regions of an antibody.

An antibody digested by papain yields three fragments: two Fab fragments and one Fc fragment

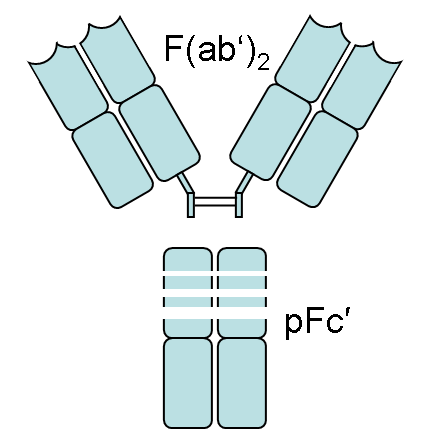
An antibody digested by pepsin yields two fragments: a F(ab')_{2} fragment and a pFc' fragment

The variable regions of the heavy and light chains can be fused together to form a single-chain variable fragment (scFv), which is only half the size of the Fab fragment, yet retains the original specificity of the parent immunoglobulin.

== Applications ==
=== Therapeutics ===
Fabs have seen some therapeutic use in emergency medicine as an antidote. Marketed applications include digoxin immune fab and Crofab, a mixture of Fabs for rattlesnake bites. Fabs against colchicine and tricyclic antidepressants has also been produced but are yet to see approval. Compared to whole non-human antibodies, Fab' and F(ab')_{2} antibodies are less likely to trigger anaphylaxis, as the species-related Fc region is removed.

Fabs are a common form-factor for monoclonal antibodies designated for therapeutic use. The Fab abciximab, which inhibits blood clotting, works by disabling glycoprotein IIb/IIIa found on platelets. Ranibizumab, a treatment for macular degeneration, targets vascular endothelial growth factor A, a protein involved in the growth of blood vessels. Certolizumab pegol is a Fab chemically linked to PEG, and it treats various inflammatory disorders by binding away TNFα.

=== Diagnostics ===
Fab antibodies also have diagnostic use. Arcitumomab is a mouse antibody that recognizes carcinoembryonic antigen, an antigen over-expressed in 95% of colorectal cancers. It is conjugated to a radioactive element, which will label the tumors when viewed with single-photon emission computed tomography. Sulesomab, an antigen that recognizes proteins on the surface of granulocytes, is used to label out infections, again using the ^{99m}Tc isotope.

Fab fragments are often fused to small proteins (<100 kDa) that have lower scattering, resulting in images with less contrast.

== See also ==
- Fragment crystallizable region
