= Technetium (99mTc) arcitumomab =

Pharmaceutical drug

Technetium (^{99m}Tc) arcitumomab
Monoclonal antibody
- Type: Fab' fragment
- Source: Mouse
- Target: CEA

Clinical data
- Routes of administration: Intravenous
- ATC code: V09IA06 (WHO)

Legal status
- Legal status: In general: ℞ (Prescription only)

Pharmacokinetic data
- Bioavailability: N/A
- Elimination half-life: 13 ± 4 hours

Identifiers
- CAS Number: 154361-49-6
- DrugBank: DB00113
- ChemSpider: none
- UNII: 029JF1SCU8

Chemical and physical data
- Molar mass: 54 kDa

Technetium (^{99m}Tc) arcitumomab was a drug used for the diagnostic imaging of colorectal cancers, marketed by Immunomedics. It consisted of the Fab' fragment of a monoclonal antibody (arcitumomab, trade name CEA-Scan) and a radionuclide, technetium-99m.

CEA-Scan was approved by the European Medicine Association (EMA) in October 1996 for imaging in the case of metastases and/or recurrence in patients that were suffering from colon or rectum cancer. Under the same decision, it was also approved to be used in patients that were suspected to have colon or rectal carcinoma recurrence and/or metastasis in association with rising blood CEA-levels.

== Chemistry ==
Technetium (^{99m}Tc) arcitumomab is an immunoconjugate. Arcitumomab is a Fab' fragment of IMMU-4, a murine IgG1 monoclonal antibody extracted from the ascites of mice. The enzyme pepsin cleaves the F(ab')_{2} fragment off the antibody. From this, the Fab' fragment is prepared by mild reduction.

Before application, arcitumomab is reconstituted with a solution of the radioactive agent sodium pertechnetate (^{99m}Tc) from a technetium generator.

== Mechanism of action ==
Arcitumomab recognizes carcinoembryonic antigen (CEA), an antigen over-expressed in 95% of colorectal cancers. Consequently, the antibody accumulates in such tumours together with the radioisotope, which emits photons. Via single photon emission computed tomography (SPECT), high-resolution images showing localisation, remission or progression, and metastases of the tumour can be obtained.

== Contraindications ==
Technetium (^{99m}Tc) arcitumomab is contraindicated for patients with known allergies or hypersensitivity to mouse proteins, as well as during pregnancy. Women should pause breast feeding for 24 hours after application of the drug.

== Adverse effects and overdose ==
Only mild and transient side effects have been observed, mostly immunological reactions like eosinophilia, itching and fever. Some patients develop human anti-mouse antibodies, so there is the theoretical possibility of anaphylactic reactions. High doses of IMMU-4 (up to 20-fold diagnostic arcitumomab dose) have not led to any serious events. One patient has been reported to develop a grand mal after application.

Radioactivity can lead to radiation poisoning. Since the dose of an arcitumomab application is about 10 mSv, such an overdose is unlikely.

== Removal from market ==
In August 2005, the marketing company Immunodemics voluntarily decided to withdraw the product from the market.

In September 2005, EMA accepted the decision and CEA-Scan was removed from the market.
