= Pregnancy-specific beta-1-glycoprotein 1 =

Mammalian protein found in Homo sapiens

PSG1

Identifiers
- Aliases: PSG1, B1G1, CD66f, DHFRP2, FL-NCA-1/2, PBG1, PS-beta-C/D, PS-beta-G-1, PSBG-1, PSBG1, PSG95, PSGGA, PSGIIA, SP1, pregnancy specific beta-1-glycoprotein 1
- External IDs: OMIM: 176390; GeneCards: PSG1

Gene location (Human)
| Chr. | Chromosome 19 (human) |
| Band | 19q13.2 | Start | 42,866,464 bp |
| Band | 19q13.2 | End | 42,879,822 bp |
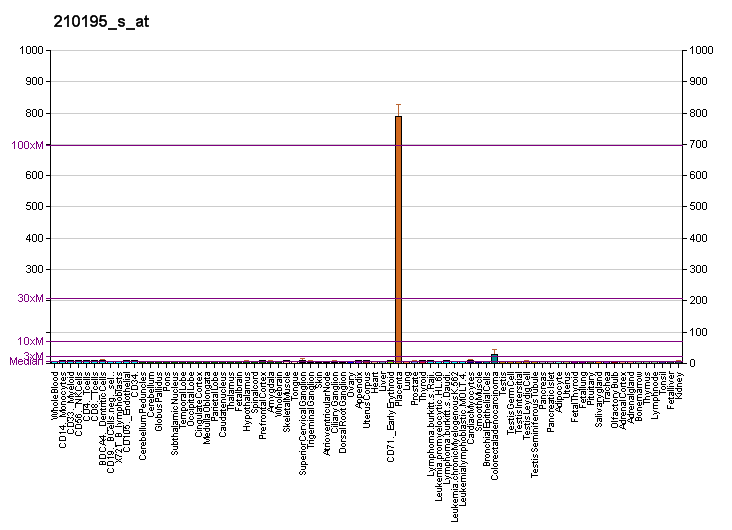

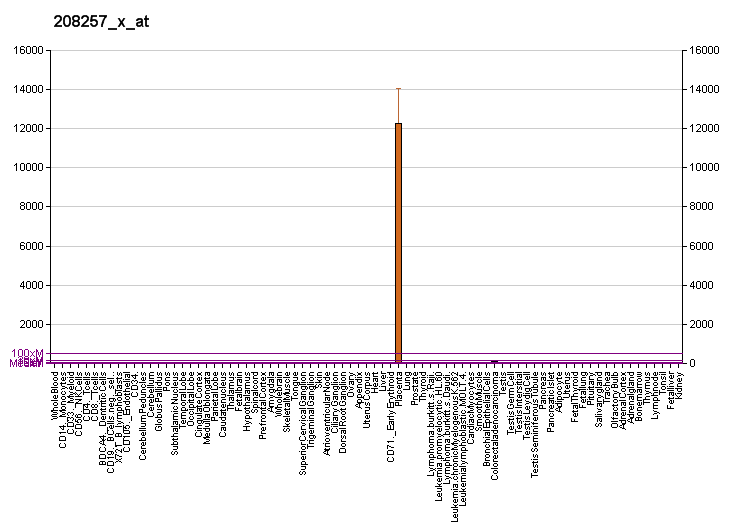

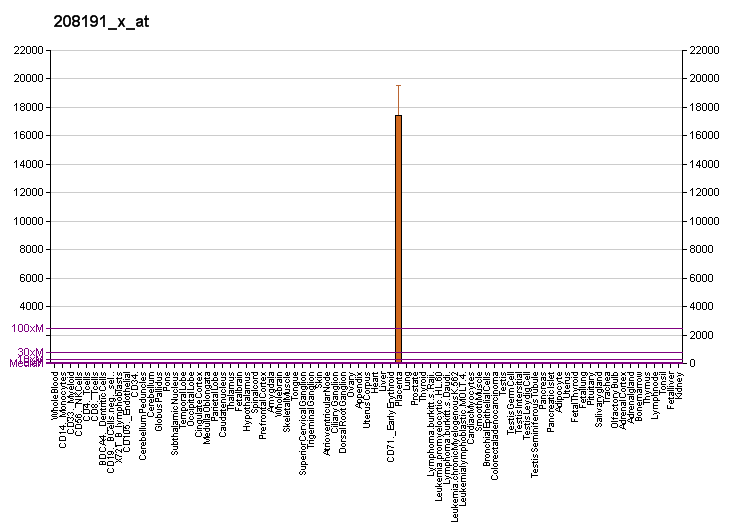
RNA expression pattern
| Bgee | Human / Mouse (ortholog); Top expressed in: placenta; buccal mucosa cell; testicle; stromal cell of endometrium; amniotic fluid; gonad; pancreatic ductal cell; secondary oocyte; skin of hip; lower lobe of lung / n/a; More reference expression data |
| BioGPS | More reference expression data |
Gene ontology
| Molecular function | protein binding |
| Cellular component | extracellular region |
| Biological process | female pregnancy; leukocyte migration |
Sources:Amigo / QuickGO
Orthologs
| Databases | NCBI: entry; OMA: entry |
| Species | Human | Mouse |
| Entrez | 5669 | n/a |
| Ensembl | ENSG00000231924 | n/a |
| UniProt | P11464 | n/a |
| RefSeq (mRNA) | NM_001184825; NM_001184826; NM_001297773; NM_006905; NM_001330524 | n/a |
| RefSeq (protein) | NP_001171754; NP_001171755; NP_001284702; NP_001317453; NP_008836 | n/a |
| Location (UCSC) | Chr 19: 42.87 – 42.88 Mb | n/a |
| PubMed search | | n/a |
- Wikidata
| View/Edit Human |

Pregnancy-specific beta-1-glycoprotein 1 (PSBG-1) also known as CD66f (Cluster of Differentiation 66f), is a protein that in humans is encoded by the PSG1 gene and is a member of the carcinoembryonic antigen (CEA) gene family. Pregnancy-specific glycoproteins (PSGs) are a complex consisting of carbohydrate and protein, which is present in the mammalian body specifically during pregnancy. This glycoprotein is the most abundant protein found in the maternal bloodstream during the later stages of pregnancy and it is of vital importance in fetal development. The PSG functions primarily as an immunomodulator to protect the growing fetus.

== Structure ==
PSG is a member of the immunoglobulin (Ig) superfamily and contains four immunoglobulin domains.

The complete isolation of certain glycoproteins, later classified as pregnancy-specific, within human blood serum occurred in the early 1980s, when experimental techniques like molecular cloning became common practice. The serum was being collected during the first trimester of pregnancy to test for other vital molecules that are present during pregnancy and it was in those samples that they were able to isolate the PSGs specifically and characterize their structure. PSGs have been studied extensively in multiple mammalian species; mammals including rodents, monkeys, elk, moose, cows, sheep, and humans. Mice are the primary subject in significant portion of PSG studies. Specific structure can vary between species regarding different sugars within the carbohydrate and amino acids within the protein; all species that contain a glycoprotein will have a core protein covalently bound to a carbohydrate. This covalently bound complex structure greatly contributes to the stability of the PSG; mammalian PSGs have demonstrated continual activity when subjected to an environment from 20 to 60 °C and within a pH of 5.0-11.0. The protein portion of the PSG varies depending on the gene coding for it. Several of the genes and proteins have been characterized by common experimental methods such as polymerase chain reaction, gel electrophoresis, ELISA, and restriction enzymes. The different genes produce PSGs with varying masses that contain different exposed amino acids residues; the residues that are exposed determine the type of binding site that can be used to bind PSG.

While receptors for other PSG family members have been identified, the precise receptor for PSG1 remains unknown. Cell surface receptors for PSGs are found on many cells throughout the body including dendritic cells and epithelial cells. These receptors are present both during development and in the adult. These receptors are also similar between species. Studies comparing mice and human PSGs discovered that some human PSGs when inserted into mice demonstrated partial levels of activity, because receptors present on the mice cells were able to interact with the human PSG. PSGs require the presence of a proteoglycan (PG) on the surface of the cell in order to bind. The PSG actually will specifically bind to the glycosaminoglycan (GAG) portion of the PG, which protrudes from the membrane of the cell. Their binding of PSG can be affected by heparin, which is a competitive inhibitor that binds to the GAG portion of a PG.

== Formation ==
Pregnancy-specific beta-1-glycoprotein is a major product of the syncytiotrophoblast in the placenta, reaching concentrations of 100 to 290 mg/L at term in the serum of pregnant women.

PSGs are synthesized through a gene's coding for a specific protein. These genes belong to a specific gene family; they are a subgroup of the carcinoembryonic antigen (CEA) family of genes. CEAs are immunoglobulins. Within humans there are total of 11 PSG genes located on the 19th chromosome; there are 17 genes within mice on the 7th chromosome. These genes code for PSGs that are of varying lengths of amino acids.

In order to characterize these separate types of PSGs, samples of the human placenta can be extracted and analyzed or they can be collected from blood. Though PSGs are abundant in the bloodstream a larger concentration is also found in the placenta, because PSGs are synthesized in the syncytiotrophoblast cells located in the placenta. Rodents also produce PSGs within their placenta but these cells are called spongiotrophoblasts. The presence of the PSGs can be recognized as early as 14 days after the initial fertilization of the egg. Throughout the course of the pregnancy the levels of PCGs within the bloodstream will continue to slowly and steadily rise.

== Function ==
PSGs are extremely vital to development and health of a fetus. Specifically they are important in inducing, enhancing or inhibiting an immune response. PSGs regulate lymphocytes and without the presence of the PSGs the fetus would be susceptible to various types of immune attacks from the maternal bloodstream. This includes immune responses to things such as inflammation, infection, and trauma which may occur during pregnancy. In addition PSG presence within the maternal bloodstream can induce the secretion of growth factors affecting fetal growth. Low levels of PSGs in the maternal bloodstream are associated with higher occurrences of abortion, fetal retardation, low birth weight and hypoxia.

== Inhibitors ==
Antibodies can form within the body that are specific to PSGs. These antibodies, when present, will cause symptoms similar as when PSG levels are low. Rodents and monkeys that were injected with a serum composed of the antibodies demonstrated an elevated abortion rate if pregnant and an increase of infertility if not pregnant. The receptors of some PSGs in mice have been discovered to be receptors for certain types of viruses. The mouse hepatitis virus (MHV) has been known to bind to a receptor for PSGs that is located within the brain.

External factors can also have an effect on the presence and function of PSGs. Specifically smoking during the first trimester of pregnancy can have adverse effects of the fetus. A pregnant female who has smoked is likely to have a significantly lower blood concentration of PSGs, specifically in the second and third trimester. The later effect on concentration correlates with restriction of fetal growth. A significant difference between the concentrations during the first trimester has not been conclusively proven.

== Applications ==
A lack of PSGs can have such a detrimental effect on the success of a pregnancy that it is a standard practice to test and measure the levels of PSGs within the maternal bloodstream during the first trimester. A low concentration level of PSGs can be an indication of Down syndrome.

Though high levels of PSGs are ideal during fetal development; their concentration throughout the rest of life, excluding the times in which a female is pregnant, is ideally low. A low concentration in adults is wanted to ensure normal and effective responses from the immune system. Adults that have a high level of PSG within their system are significantly more likely to suffer from tumors, because the immune system is repressed from fighting of abnormal cell growth.

== See also ==
- Cluster of differentiation
