= CEACAM5 =

Mammalian protein found in Homo sapiens

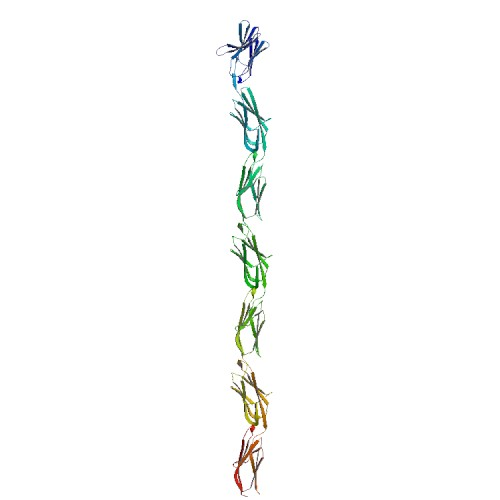

Identifiers
- Aliases: CEACAM5, CD66e, CEA, carcinoembryonic antigen related cell adhesion molecule 5, CEA cell adhesion molecule 5
- External IDs: OMIM: 114890; GeneCards: CEACAM5
Available structures
PDB	Human UniProt search: PDBe RCSB
PDB	List of PDB id codes 1E07, 2QSQ, 2QST, 2VER

Gene location (Human)
Chr.	Chromosome 19 (human)
Band	19q13.2	Start	41,708,585 bp
Band	19q13.2	End	41,730,433 bp
RNA expression pattern
Bgee	Human / Mouse (ortholog); Top expressed in: mucosa of ileum; mucosa of sigmoid colon; nasal epithelium; rectum; mucosa of transverse colon; mucosa of pharynx; appendix; oral cavity; palpebral conjunctiva; trachea / n/a; More reference expression data
BioGPS	n/a
Gene ontology
Molecular function	GPI anchor binding; protein homodimerization activity; identical protein binding
Cellular component	anchored component of membrane; basolateral plasma membrane; integral component of plasma membrane; extracellular exosome; membrane; integral component of external side of plasma membrane; extracellular region; plasma membrane; cell surface; apical plasma membrane
Biological process	homotypic cell-cell adhesion; negative regulation of apoptotic process; negative regulation of anoikis; negative regulation of myotube differentiation; C-terminal protein lipidation; leukocyte migration; apoptotic process; cell adhesion; homophilic cell adhesion via plasma membrane adhesion molecules; heterophilic cell-cell adhesion via plasma membrane cell adhesion molecules
Sources:Amigo / QuickGO
Orthologs
Databases	NCBI: entry; OMA: entry
Species	Human	Mouse
Entrez	1048	n/a
Ensembl	ENSG00000105388	n/a
UniProt	P06731	n/a
RefSeq (mRNA)	NM_001291484; NM_001308398; NM_004363	n/a
RefSeq (protein)	NP_001278413; NP_001295327; NP_004354	n/a
Location (UCSC)	Chr 19: 41.71 – 41.73 Mb	n/a
PubMed search		n/a
- Wikidata
View/Edit Human

Carcinoembryonic antigen-related cell adhesion molecule 5 (CEACAM5) also known as CD66e (Cluster of Differentiation 66e), is a member of the carcinoembryonic antigen (CEA) gene family.

== Functions ==
In the literature, CEACAM5 is often used as a synonym for cancer embryonic antigen (CEA), a well-known biomarker of many types of malignancies, such as colorectal cancer and non-small-cell lung cancer. Its primary function in the embryonic intestine and colon tumors is adhesion between epithelial cells. Also, it plays a significant role in the inhibition of differentiation and apoptosis in colon cells. There are evidences that high CEACAM5 expression is firmly associated with the CD133-positive colorectal cancer stem cells. High CEACAM5 expression has also been identified in ~25% of patients with advanced non-squamous (NSq) non-small cell lung cancer (NSCLC) detectable via IHC (immunohistochemistry).

== See also ==
- Cluster of differentiation
