= CEACAM8 =

Mammalian protein found in Homo sapiens

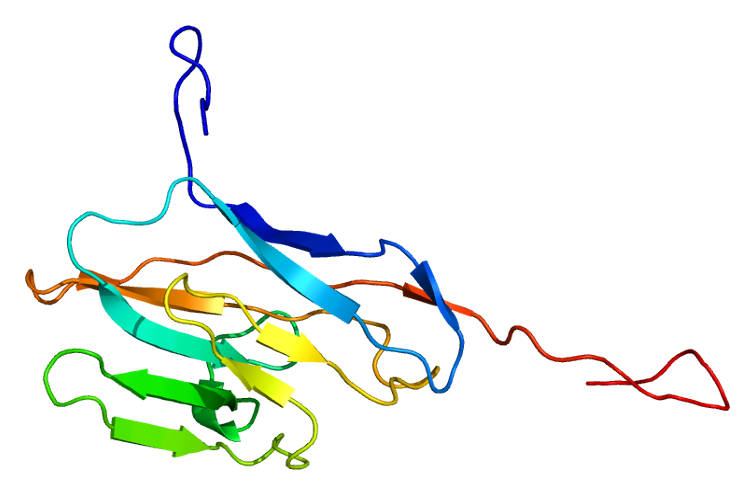

Identifiers
- Aliases: CEACAM8, CD66b, CD67, CGM6, NCA-95, carcinoembryonic antigen related cell adhesion molecule 8, CEA cell adhesion molecule 8
- External IDs: OMIM: 615747; GeneCards: CEACAM8
Available structures
PDB	Human UniProt search: PDBe RCSB
PDB	List of PDB id codes 2DKS, 4Y88, 4YIQ, 4WTZ

Gene location (Human)
Chr.	Chromosome 19 (human)
Band	19q13.2	Start	42,580,243 bp
Band	19q13.2	End	42,595,055 bp
RNA expression pattern
Bgee	Human / Mouse (ortholog); Top expressed in: trabecular bone; bone marrow; bone marrow cell; testicle; mononuclear cell; monocyte; blood; granulocyte; spleen; mucosa of transverse colon / n/a; More reference expression data
BioGPS	n/a
Gene ontology
Molecular function	protein binding; protein heterodimerization activity
Cellular component	anchored component of membrane; plasma membrane; integral component of plasma membrane; extracellular exosome; membrane; extracellular space; azurophil granule membrane; specific granule membrane; tertiary granule membrane; cell surface
Biological process	immune response; leukocyte migration; neutrophil degranulation; cell adhesion; heterophilic cell-cell adhesion via plasma membrane cell adhesion molecules
Sources:Amigo / QuickGO
Orthologs
Databases	NCBI: entry; OMA: entry
Species	Human	Mouse
Entrez	1088	n/a
Ensembl	ENSG00000124469	n/a
UniProt	P31997	n/a
RefSeq (mRNA)	NM_001816	n/a
RefSeq (protein)	NP_001807	n/a
Location (UCSC)	Chr 19: 42.58 – 42.6 Mb	n/a
PubMed search		n/a
- Wikidata
View/Edit Human

Carcinoembryonic antigen-related cell adhesion molecule 8 (CEACAM8) also known as CD66b (Cluster of Differentiation 66b), is a member of the carcinoembryonic antigen (CEA) gene family. Its main function is cell adhesion, cell migration, and pathogen binding.

== Use ==
CEACAM8 is expressed exclusively on granulocytes and used as granulocyte marker.

== See also ==
- Cluster of differentiation
