= CEACAM1 =

Mammalian protein found in humans

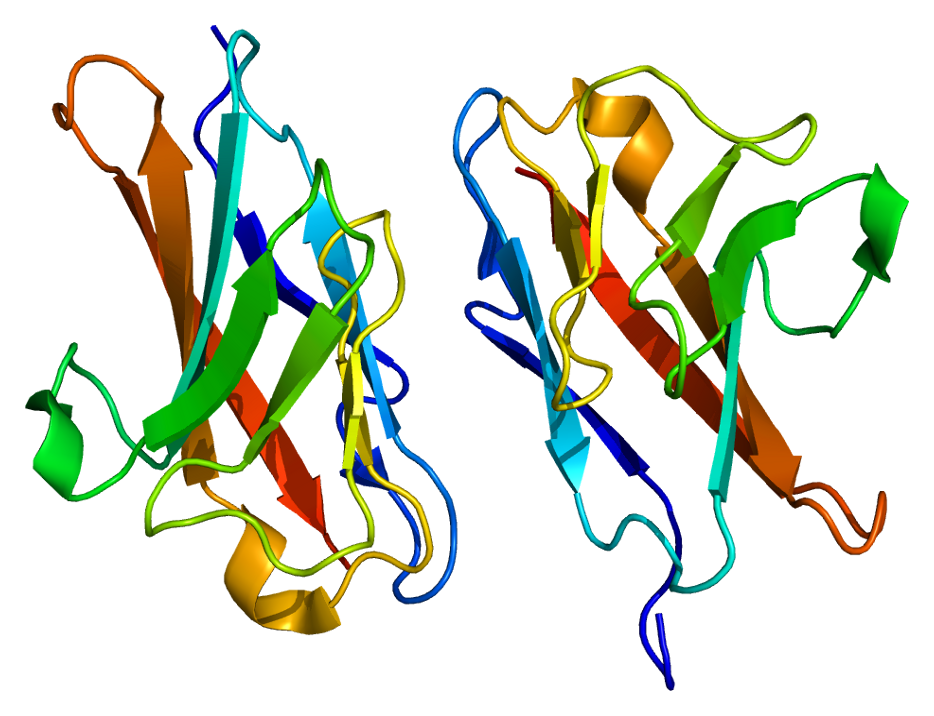

Identifiers
- Aliases: CEACAM1, BGP, BGP1, BGPI, carcinoembryonic antigen related cell adhesion molecule 1, CEA cell adhesion molecule 1
- External IDs: OMIM: 109770; MGI: 1347246; GeneCards: CEACAM1
Available structures
PDB	Ortholog search: P13688%20or%20M0R2K4 PDBe P13688,M0R2K4 RCSB
PDB	List of PDB id codes 2GK2, 4QXW, 5DZL, 4WHD

Gene location (Human)
Chr.	Chromosome 19 (human)
Band	19q13.2	Start	42,507,304 bp
Band	19q13.2	End	42,561,234 bp

Gene location (Mouse)
Chr.	Chromosome 7 (mouse)
Band	7 A3|7 13.87 cM	Start	25,215,467 bp
Band	7 A3|7 13.87 cM	End	25,239,282 bp
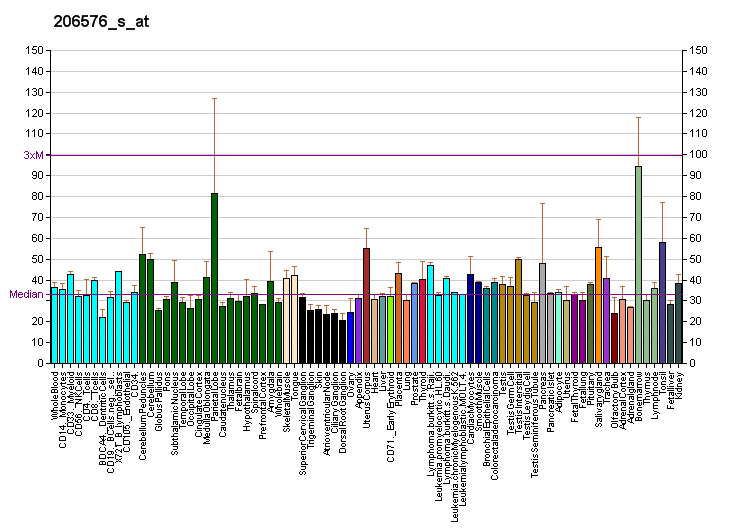

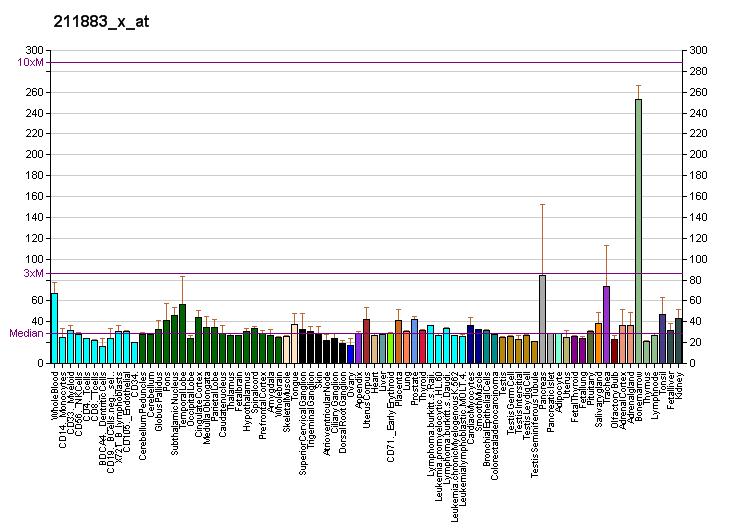

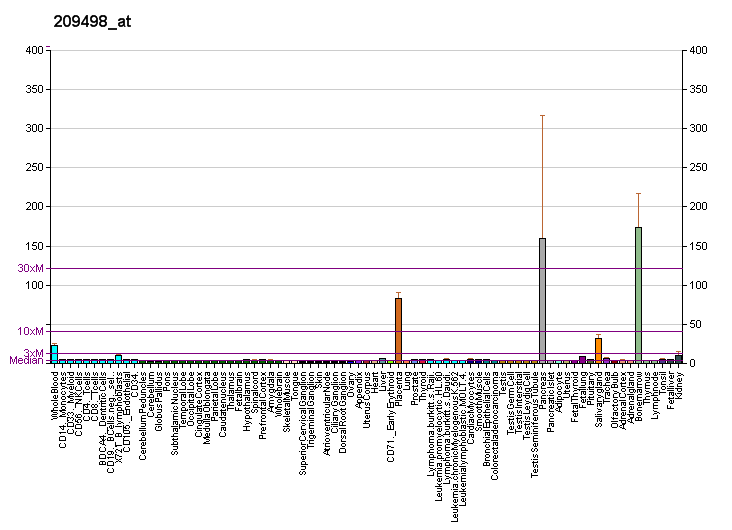
RNA expression pattern
Bgee	Human / Mouse (ortholog); Top expressed in: mucosa of ileum; mucosa of transverse colon; mucosa of sigmoid colon; rectum; minor salivary glands; jejunal mucosa; duodenum; bone marrow; bone marrow cell; appendix / Top expressed in: spermatid; right kidney; zygote; proximal tubule; seminiferous tubule; left colon; secondary oocyte; lens; major salivary gland; parotid gland; More reference expression data
BioGPS	More reference expression data
Gene ontology
Molecular function	protein binding; kinase binding; protein homodimerization activity; protein phosphatase binding; protein tyrosine kinase binding; filamin binding; bile acid transmembrane transporter activity; protein dimerization activity; actin binding; calmodulin binding; molecular function; identical protein binding
Cellular component	membrane; integral component of membrane; extracellular region; integral component of plasma membrane; extracellular exosome; T cell receptor complex; cell-cell junction; cell surface; plasma membrane; adherens junction; basal plasma membrane; apical plasma membrane; lateral plasma membrane; cell junction; transport vesicle membrane; cytoplasmic vesicle; microvillus membrane; specific granule membrane; cell projection; tertiary granule membrane
Biological process	integrin-mediated signaling pathway; cell migration; angiogenesis; leukocyte migration; insulin catabolic process; positive regulation of vasculogenesis; cellular response to insulin stimulus; negative regulation of cytotoxic T cell degranulation; regulation of ERK1 and ERK2 cascade; regulation of homophilic cell adhesion; negative regulation of vascular permeability; regulation of endothelial cell migration; negative regulation of interleukin-1 production; homophilic cell adhesion via plasma membrane adhesion molecules; granulocyte colony-stimulating factor signaling pathway; wound healing, spreading of cells; negative regulation of hepatocyte proliferation; negative regulation of granulocyte differentiation; negative regulation of platelet aggregation; blood vessel development; negative regulation of lipid biosynthetic process; bile acid and bile salt transport; regulation of blood vessel remodeling; negative regulation of T cell receptor signaling pathway; negative regulation of natural killer cell mediated cytotoxicity directed against tumor cell target; regulation of cell growth; insulin receptor internalization; negative regulation of T cell mediated cytotoxicity; regulation of sprouting angiogenesis; negative regulation of protein kinase activity; negative regulation of fatty acid biosynthetic process; regulation of cell migration; regulation of phosphatidylinositol 3-kinase signaling; common myeloid progenitor cell proliferation; regulation of epidermal growth factor receptor signaling pathway; regulation of endothelial cell differentiation; cell adhesion; neutrophil degranulation; cell-cell adhesion via plasma-membrane adhesion molecules
Sources:Amigo / QuickGO
Orthologs
Databases	NCBI: entry; OMA: entry
Species	Human	Mouse
Entrez	634	26367
Ensembl	ENSG00000079385	ENSMUSG00000054385
UniProt	Q3KRG8	Q925P2
RefSeq (mRNA)	NM_001024912; NM_001184813; NM_001184815; NM_001184816; NM_001205344 NM_001712	NM_001113368; NM_001113369; NM_007543
RefSeq (protein)	NP_001020083.1; NP_001020083; NP_001171742; NP_001171744; NP_001171745 NP_001192273; NP_001703	NP_001106839; NP_001106840; NP_031569
Location (UCSC)	Chr 19: 42.51 – 42.56 Mb	Chr 7: 25.22 – 25.24 Mb
PubMed search
- Wikidata
View/Edit Human	View/Edit Mouse

Carcinoembryonic antigen-related cell adhesion molecule 1 (biliary glycoprotein) (CEACAM1) also known as CD66a (Cluster of Differentiation 66a), is a human glycoprotein, and a member of the carcinoembryonic antigen (CEA) gene family.

== Function ==
This gene encodes a member of the carcinoembryonic antigen (CEA) gene family, which belongs to the immunoglobulin superfamily. Two subgroups of the CEA family: the CEA cell adhesion molecules and the pregnancy-specific glycoproteins are located within a 1.2 Mb cluster on the long arm of chromosome 19. Eleven pseudogenes of the CEA cell adhesion molecule subgroup are also found in the cluster. The encoded protein was originally described in bile ducts of liver as biliary glycoprotein. Subsequently, it was found to be a cell–cell adhesion molecule detected on leukocytes, epithelia, and endothelia. The encoded protein mediates cell adhesion via homophilic as well as heterophilic binding to other proteins of the subgroup. Multiple cellular activities have been attributed to the encoded protein, including roles in the differentiation and arrangement of tissue three-dimensional structure, angiogenesis, apoptosis, tumor suppression, metastasis, and the modulation of innate and adaptive immune responses. Multiple transcript variants encoding different isoforms have been reported, but the full-length nature of only two has been determined.

In melanocytic cells CEACAM1 gene expression may be regulated by MITF.

== Interactions ==
CEACAM1 has been shown to interact with PTPN11 and Annexin A2.

== See also ==
- Carcinoembryonic antigen
- Cluster of differentiation
