= TNFSF18 =

Protein-coding gene in humans

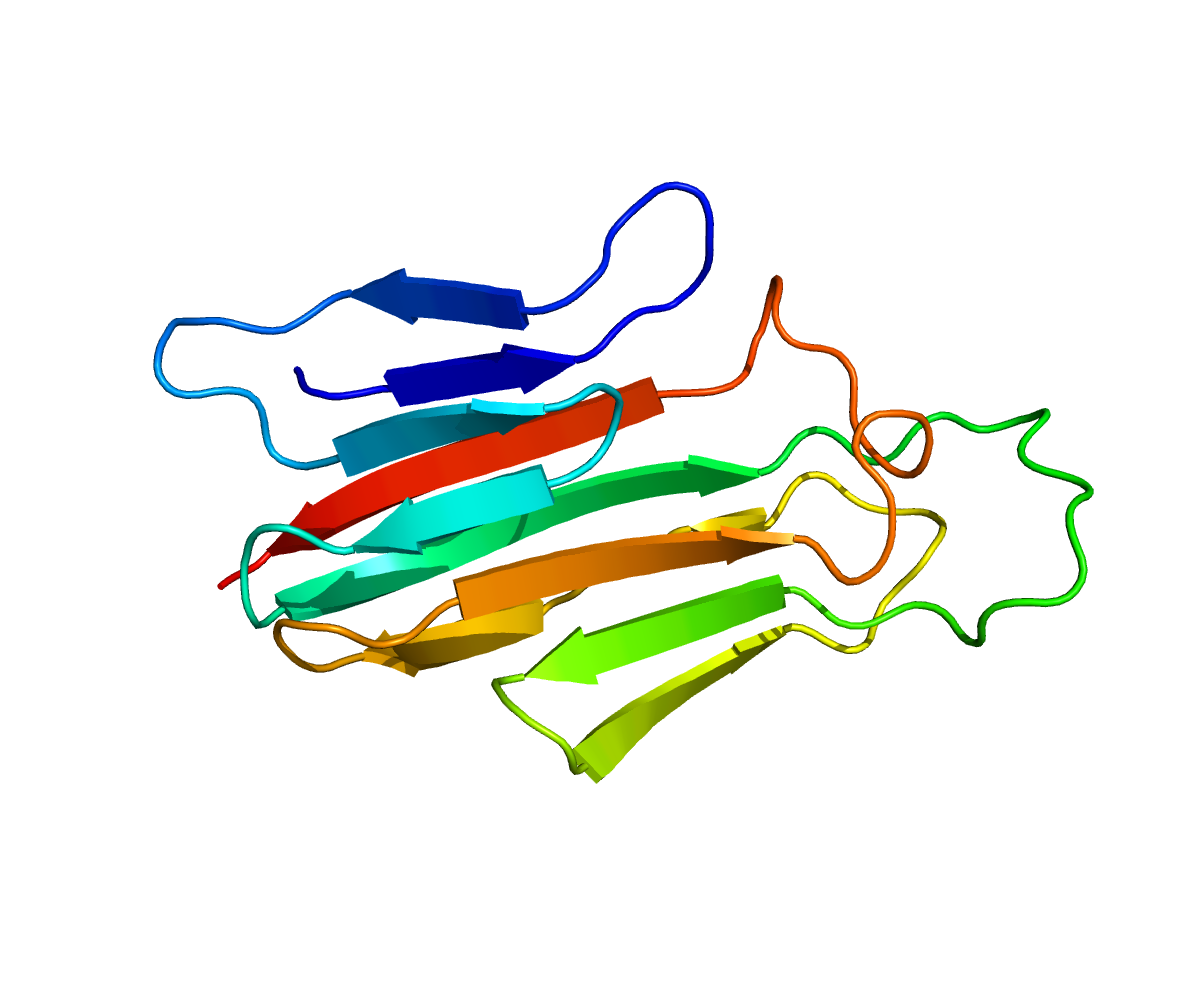

Identifiers
- Aliases: TNFSF18, AITRL, GITRL, TL6, hGITRL, TNLG2A, tumor necrosis factor superfamily member 18, TNF superfamily member 18
- External IDs: OMIM: 603898; MGI: 2673064; GeneCards: TNFSF18
Available structures
PDB	Ortholog search: PDBe RCSB
PDB	List of PDB id codes 2Q1M, 2R30, 2R32, 3B93, 3B94

Gene location (Human)
Chr.	Chromosome 1 (human)
Band	1q25.1	Start	173,039,202 bp
Band	1q25.1	End	173,050,941 bp

Gene location (Mouse)
Chr.	Chromosome 1 (mouse)
Band	1 H2.1|1 69.75 cM	Start	161,322,224 bp
Band	1 H2.1|1 69.75 cM	End	161,332,859 bp
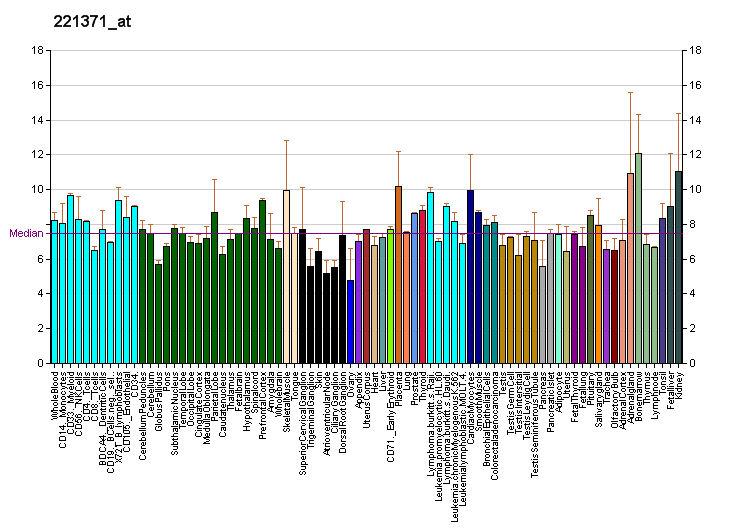
RNA expression pattern
Bgee	Human / Mouse (ortholog); Top expressed in: testicle; gallbladder; stromal cell of endometrium; cartilage tissue; rectum; prefrontal cortex; islet of Langerhans; Brodmann area 9; smooth muscle tissue; duodenum / Top expressed in: embryo; uterus; zone of skin; lip; spermatid; spleen; More reference expression data
BioGPS	More reference expression data
Gene ontology
Molecular function	cytokine activity; signaling receptor binding; protein binding; tumor necrosis factor receptor superfamily binding; identical protein binding
Cellular component	integral component of membrane; membrane; plasma membrane; extracellular space; cell surface
Biological process	adaptive immune response; positive regulation of leukocyte migration; immune system process; cell-cell signaling; negative regulation of apoptotic process; signal transduction; positive regulation of tyrosine phosphorylation of STAT protein; regulation of signaling receptor activity; T cell proliferation involved in immune response; tumor necrosis factor-mediated signaling pathway; regulation of T cell proliferation; positive regulation of cell adhesion; positive regulation of NF-kappaB transcription factor activity
Sources:Amigo / QuickGO
Orthologs
Databases	NCBI: entry; OMA: entry
Species	Human	Mouse
Entrez	8995	240873
Ensembl	ENSG00000120337	ENSMUSG00000066755
UniProt	Q9UNG2	Q7TS55
RefSeq (mRNA)	NM_005092	NM_183391
RefSeq (protein)	NP_005083	NP_899247
Location (UCSC)	Chr 1: 173.04 – 173.05 Mb	Chr 1: 161.32 – 161.33 Mb
PubMed search
- Wikidata
View/Edit Human	View/Edit Mouse

Tumor necrosis factor ligand superfamily member 18 is a protein that in humans is encoded by the TNFSF18 gene.

The protein encoded by this gene is a cytokine that belongs to the tumor necrosis factor (TNF) ligand family. This cytokine is a ligand for receptor TNFRSF18/AITR/GITR. It has been shown to modulate T lymphocyte survival in peripheral tissues. This cytokine is also found to be expressed in endothelial cells, and is thought to be important for interaction between T lymphocytes and endothelial cells.
