= CFU-Mast =

Subtype of a type of stem cell

Details
- Gives rise to: Mast cells
- Location: Bone marrow
- Function: Colony forming unit

Identifiers
- TH: H2.00.04.3.02014

In biology CFU-Mast is a colony forming unit. It gives rise to mast cells.
