= CCL1 =

Mammalian protein found in humans

Identifiers
- Aliases: CCL1, I-309, P500, SCYA1, SISe, TCA3, C-C motif chemokine ligand 1
- External IDs: OMIM: 182281; MGI: 98258; GeneCards: CCL1
Available structures
PDB	Ortholog search: PDBe RCSB
PDB	List of PDB id codes 1EL0, 4OIJ, 4OIK

Gene location (Human)
Chr.	Chromosome 17 (human)
Band	17q12	Start	34,360,328 bp
Band	17q12	End	34,363,233 bp

Gene location (Mouse)
Chr.	Chromosome 11 (mouse)
Band	11 C|11 49.99 cM	Start	82,067,483 bp
Band	11 C|11 49.99 cM	End	82,196,516 bp
RNA expression pattern
Bgee	Human / Mouse (ortholog); Top expressed in: testicle; gonad; primary visual cortex; rectum; pharynx; cell; superior frontal gyrus; somatic cell; mucosa of transverse colon; monocyte / Top expressed in: embryo; embryo; thymus; skin of abdomen; placenta; male human body; male reproductive system; testicle; spermatid; lip; More reference expression data
BioGPS	n/a
Gene ontology
Molecular function	cytokine activity; CCR chemokine receptor binding; chemokine activity
Cellular component	extracellular region; extracellular space
Biological process	chemokine-mediated signaling pathway; cellular response to tumor necrosis factor; cellular calcium ion homeostasis; neutrophil chemotaxis; chemotaxis; positive regulation of GTPase activity; cellular response to interleukin-1; immune response; positive regulation of ERK1 and ERK2 cascade; cellular response to interferon-gamma; lymphocyte chemotaxis; inflammatory response; viral process; signal transduction; positive regulation of cytosolic calcium ion concentration; antimicrobial humoral immune response mediated by antimicrobial peptide; positive regulation of monocyte chemotaxis; regulation of signaling receptor activity; G protein-coupled receptor signaling pathway; positive regulation of inflammatory response; monocyte chemotaxis; eosinophil chemotaxis
Sources:Amigo / QuickGO
Orthologs
Databases	NCBI: entry; OMA: entry
Species	Human	Mouse
Entrez	6346	20290
Ensembl	ENSG00000108702	ENSMUSG00000020702
UniProt	P22362	P10146
RefSeq (mRNA)	NM_002981	NM_011329
RefSeq (protein)	NP_002972	NP_035459
Location (UCSC)	Chr 17: 34.36 – 34.36 Mb	Chr 11: 82.07 – 82.2 Mb
PubMed search
- Wikidata
View/Edit Human	View/Edit Mouse

Chemokine (C-C motif) ligand 1 (CCL1) is a protein that in humans is encoded by the CCL1 gene. It is a small glycoprotein belonging to the CC chemokine family which is also known as small inducible cytokine A1 and I-309 in humans.

== Genomics ==
CCL1 is encoded by CCL1 gene which is one of the several chemokine genes clustered on the chromosome 17q11.2-q12 in humans. It is expressed by specifically activated T cells upon secondary stimulation. The homologous mouse gene is termed Tca-3.

== Discovery ==
CCL is the first human CCL chemokine that was identified by molecular cloning during searching for genes expressed by T cells.

== Function ==
CCL1 is a small glycoprotein with a molecular weight of approximately 15-16 kDa. CCL1 is secreted by activated monocytes/macrophages, T lymphocytes and endothelial cells. CCL1 binds to the chemokine receptor CCR8 and induces Ca2+ influx, chemotaxis and regulate apoptosis. CCR8 is constitutively expressed in monocytes/macrophages, Th2, and regulatory T lymphocytes. Thus, CCL1 mainly acts as a chemoattractant for monocytes/macrophages, T lymphocytes, specially Th2-differentiated T cells and a subset of T regulatory cells in vitro into inflammatory site. It can also attract NK cells, immature B cells but does not attract neutrophils.

CCL1 stimulates a transient increase in the concentration of cytoplasmic free calcium in monocytes but not in other type of cells. Furthermore, CCL1 inhibits apoptosis in thymic cell lines by the RAS/MAPK pathway but can prevent dexamethasone-induced apoptosis in cultured murine thymic lymphoma cells.

== Clinical importance ==
CCL1 is involved in inflammatory processes through leukocyte recruitment and could play a crucial role in angiogenesis and other viral and tumoral processes. For example, CCL1 transcription was increased in primary human CD4^{+} T cells expressing T cell immunoglobulin and protein 3 containing the mucin domain (TIM-3) and was identified as a differentially transcribed gene in CD4^{+} cells T cells expressing TIM-3 that play a role in the regulation anti-tumor immunity. CCL1 is also overexpressed in ATL cells and mediates an autocrine antiapoptotic loop along CCR8 for in vivo growth and survival of leukemic cells. Due to these facts, the dysregulation of CCL1 can leads in pathogenesis of several diseases. Some single nucleotide polymorphisms (SNPs) in the CCL1 gene are associated with exacerbations of chronic obstructive pulmonary disease (COPD).

CCL1 plays a role in various CNS functions and could be associated with some neuroinflammatory disorders. In addition to other chemokines, such as CCL2, CCL3, and CCL4, the presence of CCL1 has been reported in the development of brain abscesses, most likely leading to an influx of lymphocytes and monocytes and thus to an adaptive immune response.

Because CCL1 binds to the CCR8 receptor, some diseases can be caused by dysregulation and dysfunction of this receptor. For example, CCL1 and CCR8 mRNA expression has been detected in the CNS of mice with experimental autoimmune encephalomyelitis (EAE). However, the CCR8 receptor has also been shown to be associated with phagocytic macrophages and activated microglia in MS lesions and directly correlate with demyelinating activity. The CCR8 receptor can serve as a basic receptor for various strains of HIV-1 tropical, dual-tropical and macrophage tropics of HIV-1. Thus, CCl1 has also been studied as a possible potent inhibitor of fusion of cells and cells mediated by HIV-1 envelope and viral infection.

Due to the pathologies that can be caused by dysregulation of the CCR8 receptor, some research are focused on the possibilities of inhibiting this receptor. To suppress the apoptotic activity of CCL1, removing three amino acids from the C-terminus of CCL1 reduces CCR8 binding but converts CCL1 to a more potent CCR8 agonist, leading to increased intracellular calcium release and increased antiapoptotic activity.
