= CEACAM20 =

Protein-coding gene in the species Homo sapiens

Identifiers
- Aliases: CEACAM20, UNQ9366, carcinoembryonic antigen related cell adhesion molecule 20, CEA cell adhesion molecule 20
- External IDs: MGI: 1918851; GeneCards: CEACAM20

Gene location (Human)
Chr.	Chromosome 19 (human)
Band	19q13.31	Start	44,501,677 bp
Band	19q13.31	End	44,529,788 bp

Gene location (Mouse)
Chr.	Chromosome 7 (mouse)
Band	7|7 A3	Start	19,699,337 bp
Band	7|7 A3	End	19,725,029 bp
RNA expression pattern
Bgee	Human / Mouse (ortholog); Top expressed in: duodenum; gallbladder; prostate; smooth muscle tissue; right lobe of liver; right adrenal cortex; placenta; appendix; rectum; left testis / Top expressed in: zygote; jejunum; left colon; secondary oocyte; ileum; primary oocyte; epithelium of small intestine; duodenum; morula; blastocyst; More reference expression data
BioGPS	n/a
Orthologs
Databases	NCBI: entry; OMA: entry
Species	Human	Mouse
Entrez	125931	71601
Ensembl	ENSG00000273777	ENSMUSG00000070777
UniProt	Q6UY09	Q9D2Z1
RefSeq (mRNA)	NM_001102597; NM_001102598; NM_001102599; NM_001102600; NM_198444	NM_027839
RefSeq (protein)	NP_001096067; NP_001096068; NP_001096069; NP_001096070; NP_001096070.2	NP_082115
Location (UCSC)	Chr 19: 44.5 – 44.53 Mb	Chr 7: 19.7 – 19.73 Mb
PubMed search
- Wikidata
View/Edit Human	View/Edit Mouse

Carcinoembryonic antigen-related cell adhesion molecule 20 is a carcinoembryonic antigen encoded in the human by the CEACAM20 gene.
