= CEACAM4 =

Protein-coding gene in humans

Identifiers
- Aliases: CEACAM4, CGM7, CGM7_HUMAN, NCA, carcinoembryonic antigen related cell adhesion molecule 4, CEA cell adhesion molecule 4
- External IDs: GeneCards: CEACAM4

Gene location (Human)
Chr.	Chromosome 19 (human)
Band	19q13.2	Start	41,619,015 bp
Band	19q13.2	End	41,627,074 bp
RNA expression pattern
Bgee	Human / Mouse (ortholog); Top expressed in: blood; monocyte; spleen; granulocyte; bone marrow; testicle; bone marrow cell; appendix; right lung; upper lobe of left lung / n/a; More reference expression data
BioGPS	n/a
Orthologs
Databases	NCBI: entry; OMA: entry
Species	Human	Mouse
Entrez	1089	n/a
Ensembl	ENSG00000105352; ENSG00000274131	n/a
UniProt	O75871	n/a
RefSeq (mRNA)	NM_001817; NM_001362492; NM_001362493; NM_001362495	n/a
RefSeq (protein)	NP_001808; NP_001349421; NP_001349422; NP_001349424	n/a
Location (UCSC)	Chr 19: 41.62 – 41.63 Mb	n/a
PubMed search		n/a
- Wikidata
View/Edit Human

CEA cell adhesion molecule 4 is a protein that in humans is encoded by the CEACAM4 gene. CEACAM4 has also been called carcinoembryonic antigen CGM7. It is predicted to be involved in phagocytosis and to act upstream of or within flagellated sperm motility

It is located in extracellular region. Orthologous to several human genes including CEACAM4 (CEA cell adhesion molecule 4); interacts with 1-naphthyl isothiocyanate; 17alpha-ethynylestradiol; 2,3,4,7,8-Pentachlorodibenzofuran.
