= CEACAM21 =

Protein-coding gene in the species Homo sapiens

Identifiers
- Aliases: CEACAM21, CEACAM3, R29124_1, carcinoembryonic antigen related cell adhesion molecule 21, CEA cell adhesion molecule 21
- External IDs: OMIM: 618191; GeneCards: CEACAM21

Gene location (Human)
Chr.	Chromosome 19 (human)
Band	19q13.2	Start	41,549,518 bp
Band	19q13.2	End	41,586,844 bp
RNA expression pattern
Bgee	Human / Mouse (ortholog); Top expressed in: lymph node; granulocyte; blood; bone marrow cell; spleen; appendix; placenta; monocyte; hypothalamus; gallbladder / n/a; More reference expression data
BioGPS	n/a
Orthologs
Databases	NCBI: entry; OMA: entry
Species	Human	Mouse
Entrez	90273	n/a
Ensembl	ENSG00000278565; ENSG00000007129	n/a
UniProt	Q3KPI0	n/a
RefSeq (mRNA)	NM_001098506; NM_001288773; NM_001290113; NM_033543	n/a
RefSeq (protein)	NP_001091976; NP_001275702; NP_001277042; NP_291021	n/a
Location (UCSC)	Chr 19: 41.55 – 41.59 Mb	n/a
PubMed search		n/a
- Wikidata
View/Edit Human

Carcinoembryonic antigen-related cell adhesion molecule 21 is a carcinoembryonic antigen encoded in the human by the CEACAM21 gene.
