= C-C motif chemokine receptor 8 =

Protein-coding gene in humans

CCR8

Identifiers
- Aliases: CCR8, CC-CKR-8, CCR-8, CDw198, CKRL1, CMKBR8, CMKBRL2, CY6, GPRCY6, TER1, C-C motif chemokine receptor 8
- External IDs: OMIM: 601834; MGI: 1201402; GeneCards: CCR8

Gene location (Human)
Chr.	Chromosome 3 (human)
Band	3p22.1	Start	39,329,709 bp
Band	3p22.1	End	39,333,680 bp

Gene location (Mouse)
Chr.	Chromosome 9 (mouse)
Band	9|9 F4	Start	119,921,180 bp
Band	9|9 F4	End	119,923,972 bp
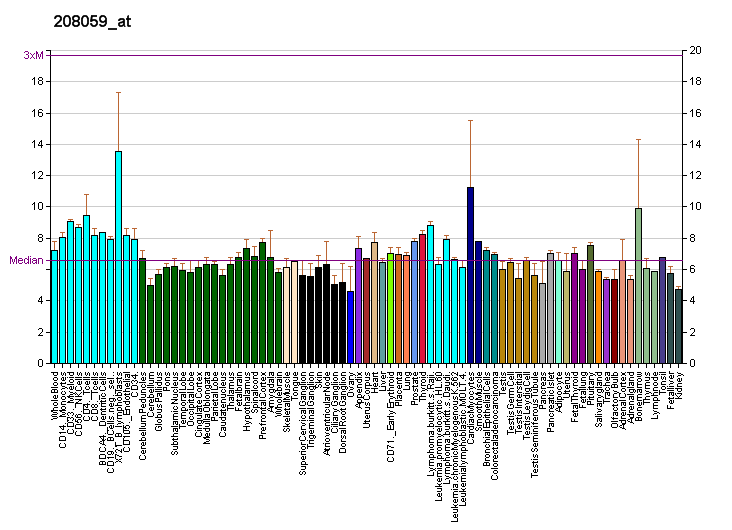
RNA expression pattern
Bgee	Human / Mouse (ortholog); Top expressed in: gonad; granulocyte; appendix; gallbladder; lymph node; blood; rectum; tonsil; urinary bladder; spleen / Top expressed in: morula; embryo; pharynx; thymus; meninges; lip; spleen; stomach; thalamus; amygdala; More reference expression data
BioGPS	More reference expression data
Gene ontology
Molecular function	C-C chemokine receptor activity; G protein-coupled receptor activity; chemokine receptor activity; coreceptor activity; signal transducer activity; chemokine binding; C-C chemokine binding
Cellular component	integral component of membrane; plasma membrane; integral component of plasma membrane; membrane; intracellular anatomical structure; external side of plasma membrane
Biological process	positive regulation of cytosolic calcium ion concentration; chemotaxis; chemokine-mediated signaling pathway; G protein-coupled receptor signaling pathway; cell adhesion; immune response; signal transduction; calcium-mediated signaling; cell chemotaxis
Sources:Amigo / QuickGO
Orthologs
Databases	NCBI: entry; OMA: entry
Species	Human	Mouse
Entrez	1237	12776
Ensembl	ENSG00000179934	ENSMUSG00000042262
UniProt	P51685	P56484
RefSeq (mRNA)	NM_005201	NM_007720
RefSeq (protein)	NP_005192	NP_031746
Location (UCSC)	Chr 3: 39.33 – 39.33 Mb	Chr 9: 119.92 – 119.92 Mb
PubMed search
- Wikidata
View/Edit Human	View/Edit Mouse

Chemokine (C-C motif) receptor 8, also known as CCR8, is a protein which in humans is encoded by the CCR8 gene. CCR8 has also recently been designated CDw198 (cluster of differentiation w198).

== Function ==
This gene encodes a member of the beta chemokine receptor family, which is predicted to be a seven transmembrane protein similar to G protein-coupled receptors. Chemokines and their receptors are important for the migration of various cell types into the inflammatory sites. This receptor protein preferentially expresses in the thymus. The ligand of the CCR8 is CCL1. CCL8 also functions as a CCR8 agonist.

Studies of this receptor and its ligands suggested its role in regulation of monocyte chemotaxis and thymic cell apoptosis. More specifically, this receptor may contribute to the proper positioning of activated T cells within the antigenic challenge sites and specialized areas of lymphoid tissues. This gene is located at the chemokine receptor gene cluster region.

== See also ==
- CC chemokine receptors
