= CEACAM18 =

Protein-coding gene in the species Homo sapiens

Identifiers
- Aliases: CEACAM18, carcinoembryonic antigen related cell adhesion molecule 18, CEA cell adhesion molecule 18
- External IDs: MGI: 1919681; GeneCards: CEACAM18

Gene location (Human)
Chr.	Chromosome 19 (human)
Band	19q13.41	Start	51,478,539 bp
Band	19q13.41	End	51,491,301 bp

Gene location (Mouse)
Chr.	Chromosome 7 (mouse)
Band	7|7 B3	Start	43,284,131 bp
Band	7|7 B3	End	43,298,719 bp
RNA expression pattern
Bgee	Human / Mouse (ortholog); Top expressed in: duodenum; gallbladder; bone marrow cell; mucosa of transverse colon; islet of Langerhans; liver; smooth muscle tissue; rectum; urinary system; stomach / Top expressed in: duodenum; jejunum; granulocyte; ileum; embryo; epithelium of small intestine; decidua; colon; blastocyst; left colon; More reference expression data
BioGPS	n/a
Orthologs
Databases	NCBI: entry; OMA: entry
Species	Human	Mouse
Entrez	729767	72431
Ensembl	ENSG00000213822	ENSMUSG00000030472
UniProt	n a	Q9D871
RefSeq (mRNA)	NM_001080405; NM_001278392; NM_001405061	NM_028236
RefSeq (protein)	n/a	NP_082512
Location (UCSC)	Chr 19: 51.48 – 51.49 Mb	Chr 7: 43.28 – 43.3 Mb
PubMed search
- Wikidata
View/Edit Human	View/Edit Mouse

CEA cell adhesion molecule 18 is a protein that in humans is encoded by the CEACAM18 gene.

CEACAM18 is a carcinoembryonic antigen.
