= Interleukin 27 receptor, alpha subunit =

Protein-coding gene in the species Homo sapiens

IL27RA

Identifiers
- Aliases: IL27RA, CRL1, IL-27RA, IL27R, TCCR, WSX1, zcytor1, Interleukin 27 receptor, alpha subunit, interleukin 27 receptor subunit alpha
- External IDs: OMIM: 605350; MGI: 1355318; GeneCards: IL27RA

Gene location (Human)
| Chr. | Chromosome 19 (human) |
| Band | 19p13.12 | Start | 14,031,762 bp |
| Band | 19p13.12 | End | 14,053,218 bp |

Gene location (Mouse)
| Chr. | Chromosome 8 (mouse) |
| Band | 8|8 C2 | Start | 84,756,923 bp |
| Band | 8|8 C2 | End | 84,769,218 bp |
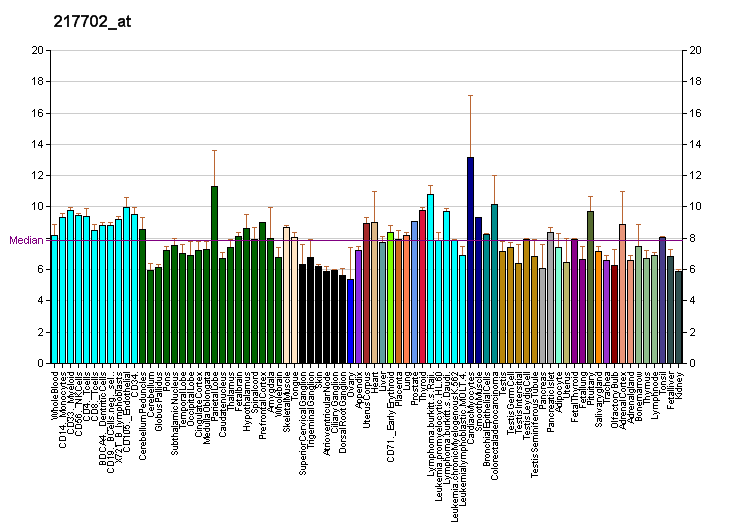

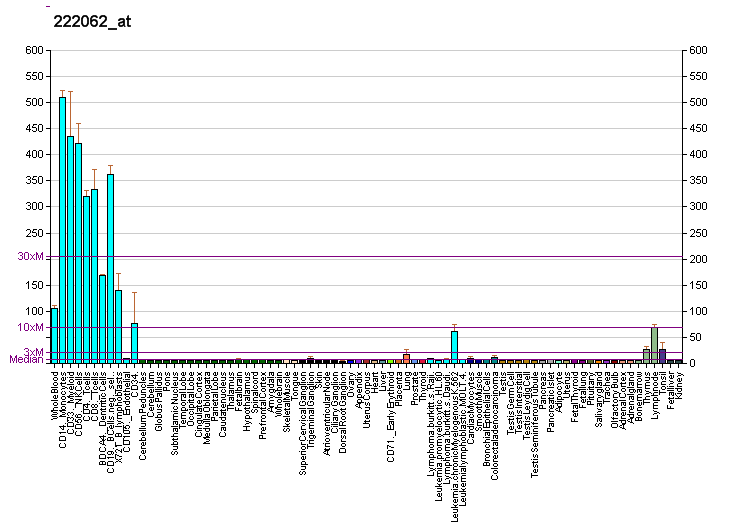

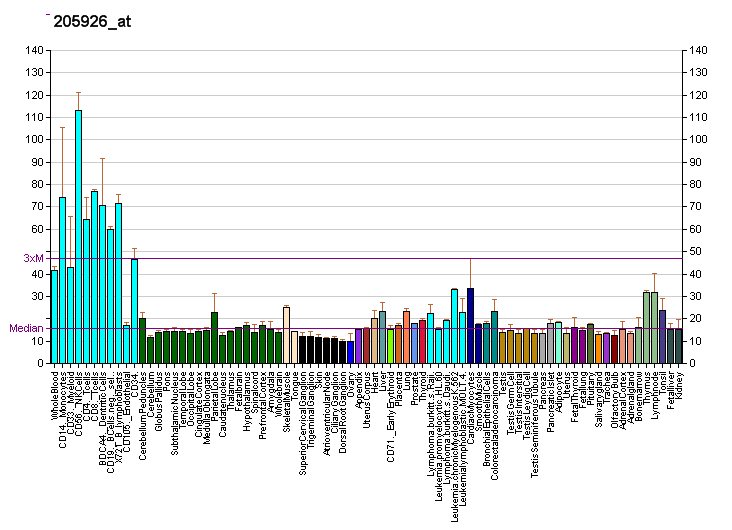
RNA expression pattern
| Bgee | Human / Mouse (ortholog); Top expressed in: granulocyte; monocyte; lymph node; blood; appendix; spleen; apex of heart; testicle; bone marrow cell; upper lobe of left lung / Top expressed in: Ileal epithelium; lymph node; mesenteric lymph nodes; blood; thymus; spleen; lactiferous gland; choroid plexus of fourth ventricle; extraocular muscle; subcutaneous adipose tissue; More reference expression data |
| BioGPS | More reference expression data |
Gene ontology
| Molecular function | transmembrane signaling receptor activity; interleukin-27 receptor activity; cytokine receptor activity; cytokine binding |
| Cellular component | integral component of membrane; plasma membrane; integral component of plasma membrane; membrane; external side of plasma membrane; receptor complex |
| Biological process | negative regulation of type 2 immune response; cell surface receptor signaling pathway; positive regulation of interferon-gamma production; regulation of isotype switching to IgG isotypes; positive regulation of T-helper 1 type immune response; immune response; defense response to Gram-positive bacterium; interleukin-27-mediated signaling pathway; interleukin-35-mediated signaling pathway; negative regulation of cellular extravasation; negative regulation of T-helper 17 type immune response; negative regulation of T cell extravasation |
Sources:Amigo / QuickGO
Orthologs
| Databases | NCBI: entry; OMA: entry |
| Species | Human | Mouse |
| Entrez | 9466 | 50931 |
| Ensembl | ENSG00000104998; ENSG00000288185 | ENSMUSG00000005465 |
| UniProt | Q6UWB1 | O70394 |
| RefSeq (mRNA) | NM_004843 | NM_016671 |
| RefSeq (protein) | NP_004834 | NP_057880 |
| Location (UCSC) | Chr 19: 14.03 – 14.05 Mb | Chr 8: 84.76 – 84.77 Mb |
| PubMed search |
- Wikidata
| View/Edit Human | View/Edit Mouse |

Interleukin 27 receptor, alpha is a subunit of the interleukin-27 receptor. IL27RA is its human gene.

== Function ==
In mice, CD4+ helper T-cells differentiate into type 1 (Th1) cells, which are critical for cell-mediated immunity, predominantly under the influence of IL12. Also, IL4 influences their differentiation into type 2 (Th2) cells, which are critical for most antibody responses. Mice deficient in these cytokines, their receptors, or associated transcription factors have impaired, but are not absent of, Th1 or Th2 immune responses. This gene encodes a protein which is similar to the mouse T-cell cytokine receptor Tccr at the amino acid level, and is predicted to be a glycosylated transmembrane protein.

== Interactions ==
Interleukin 27 receptor, alpha subunit has been shown to interact with STAT1.
