= Palaeoimmunology =

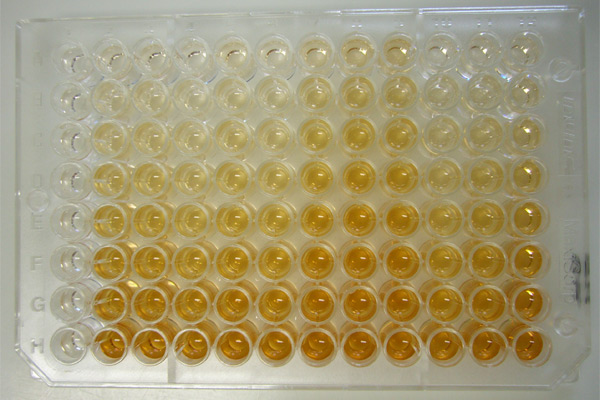
ELISA: a common immunoassay

Palaeoimmunology or paleo-immunology ("paleo"=ancient, "immuno"=referring to immunology) is the analysis using histochemical techniques to look at the matrix proteins in historic and pre-historic materials. Modern immunological assays are used to detect the presence of specific antigens in the sample material. Specimens subject to immunoassays have usually been preserved in a way that has prevented biomolecular targets from degrading. This has either been achieved through natural preservative circumstances, such as accelerated fossilization, or through artificial mummification. Regardless of the path taken to achieve this state, preservation has occurred before the denaturing of antigenic targets. The purpose of applying immunological assays to archaeological materials is to better understand the biochemical makeup and composition of these pre-historic samples. Antigenic elements within these materials may reveal information regarding the "life" and "death" of the sample being studied.

== Examples of use ==
Paleo-immunology encompasses a variety of immunoassays performed on a diverse array of archaeological materials. Paleo-immunology is a new, growing field that is still being properly defined. Examples of paleo-immunology as they appear in peer-reviewed literature are as follows:

- The extraction and analysis of collagen peptides from fossilized bones.
- The use of immunofluorescence and immunohistochemical techniques in order to study the proteins of the extracellular matrix found in mummified tissues. This was done to further understand the physiologic and pathologic alterations that can occur in preserved prehistoric tissues.
- A plague dipstick assay was used to detect the presence of plague antigens in medieval French graves. This paleo-immunological assay is also known as a "rapid diagnostic test for the plague" (RDT).
- Enzyme linked immunosorbent assay (ELISA) was used to detect remnant antigenic structures in preserved sauropod eggshells.
- The ParaSight-F test has been used to detect malaria antigens in Egyptian mummies.
