= NCR2 =

Mammalian protein found in Homo sapiens

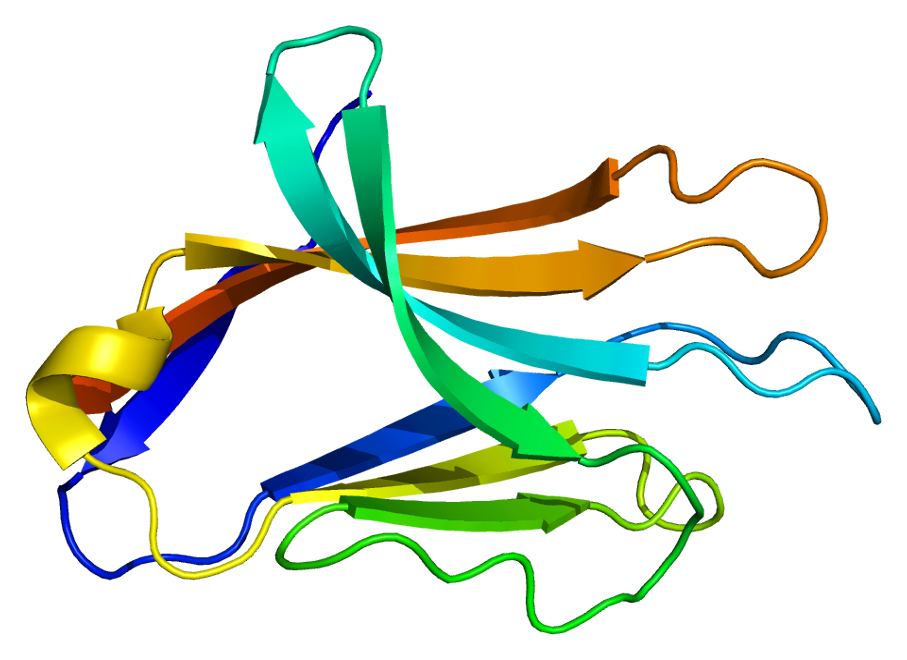

Identifiers
- Aliases: NCR2, CD336, LY95, NK-p44, NKP44, dJ149M18.1, natural cytotoxicity triggering receptor 2
- External IDs: OMIM: 604531; GeneCards: NCR2
Available structures
PDB	Human UniProt search: PDBe RCSB
PDB	List of PDB id codes 1HKF

Gene location (Human)
Chr.	Chromosome 6 (human)
Band	6p21.1	Start	41,335,608 bp
Band	6p21.1	End	41,350,889 bp
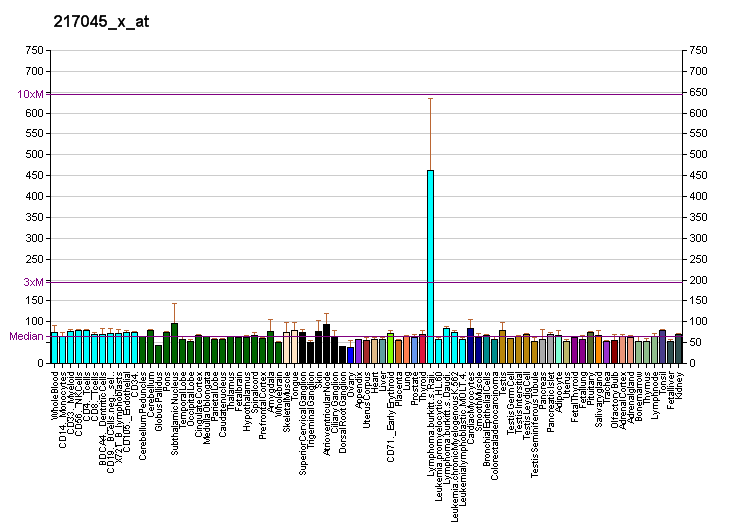

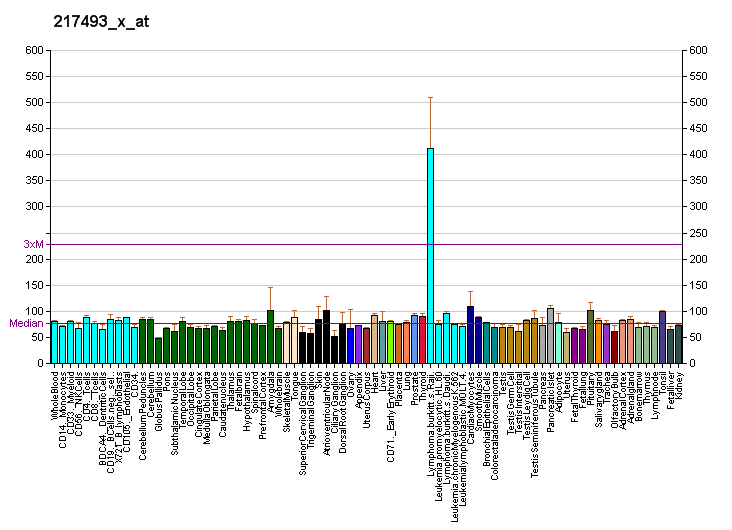

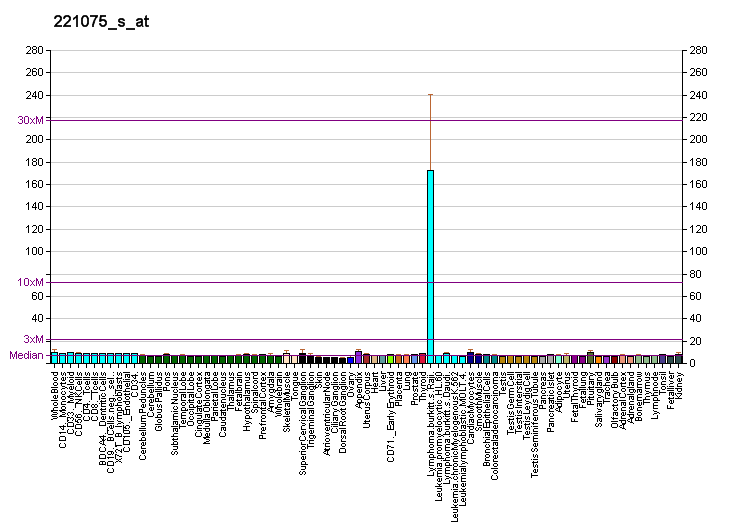
RNA expression pattern
Bgee	Human / Mouse (ortholog); Top expressed in: testicle; tibialis anterior muscle; mucosa of ileum; deltoid muscle; tendon of biceps brachii; secondary oocyte; amniotic fluid; lateral nuclear group of thalamus; cardia; synovial joint / n/a; More reference expression data
BioGPS	More reference expression data
Gene ontology
Molecular function	transmembrane signaling receptor activity; protein binding; signaling receptor activity
Cellular component	integral component of membrane; plasma membrane; integral component of plasma membrane; membrane; cell surface
Biological process	cellular defense response; innate immune response; signal transduction; regulation of immune response; regulation of innate immune response
Sources:Amigo / QuickGO
Orthologs
Databases	NCBI: entry; OMA: entry
Species	Human	Mouse
Entrez	9436	n/a
Ensembl	ENSG00000096264	n/a
UniProt	O95944	n/a
RefSeq (mRNA)	NM_004828; NM_001199509; NM_001199510	n/a
RefSeq (protein)	NP_001186438; NP_001186439; NP_004819	n/a
Location (UCSC)	Chr 6: 41.34 – 41.35 Mb	n/a
PubMed search		n/a
- Wikidata
View/Edit Human

Natural cytotoxicity triggering receptor 2 is a protein that in humans is encoded by the NCR2 gene. NCR2 has also been designated as CD336 (cluster of differentiation 336), NKp44, NKP44; NK-p44, LY95, and dJ149M18.1.
