= Interleukin-27 receptor =

Type I cytokine receptor for interleukin-27

interleukin 27 receptor, alpha

Identifiers
- Symbol: IL27RA
- Alt. symbols: WSX-1, TCCR, CRL1, WSX1, zcytor1, IL-27R
- NCBI gene: 9466
- HGNC: 17290
- OMIM: 605350
- RefSeq: NM_004843
- UniProt: Q6UWB1

Other data
- Locus: Chr. 19 p13.11
Search for
- Structures: Swiss-model
- Domains: InterPro

interleukin 6 signal transducer (gp130, oncostatin M receptor)

Identifiers
- Symbol: IL6ST
- Alt. symbols: GP130, CD130
- NCBI gene: 3572
- HGNC: 6021
- OMIM: 600694
- RefSeq: NM_002184
- UniProt: P40189

Other data
- Locus: Chr. 5 q11
Search for
- Structures: Swiss-model
- Domains: InterPro

The interleukin-27 receptor is a type I cytokine receptor for interleukin-27. It is a heterodimer composed of the interleukin 27 receptor, alpha subunit and glycoprotein 130.

IL27RA essential for transcriptional activation of STAT1 and for augmenting the induction of T-bet expression during initiation of Th1 cell differentiation.
