= CFU-DL =

Colony forming unit that gives rise to Langerhans cells

CFU-DL is a colony forming unit that gives rise to Langerhans cells.
