= CEACAM19 =

Protein-coding gene in the species Homo sapiens

Identifiers
- Aliases: CEACAM19, CEAL1, CEACM19, carcinoembryonic antigen related cell adhesion molecule 19, CEA cell adhesion molecule 19
- External IDs: OMIM: 606691; MGI: 2443001; GeneCards: CEACAM19

Gene location (Human)
Chr.	Chromosome 19 (human)
Band	19q13.31	Start	44,662,278 bp
Band	19q13.31	End	44,684,359 bp

Gene location (Mouse)
Chr.	Chromosome 7 (mouse)
Band	7|7 A3	Start	19,609,667 bp
Band	7|7 A3	End	19,621,890 bp
RNA expression pattern
Bgee	Human / Mouse (ortholog); Top expressed in: apex of heart; right uterine tube; tibial nerve; gastrocnemius muscle; body of pancreas; muscle of thigh; right lobe of liver; skin of leg; left ventricle; anterior pituitary / Top expressed in: lip; esophagus; zone of skin; stomach; urinary bladder; limb; right kidney; More reference expression data
BioGPS	n/a
Orthologs
Databases	NCBI: entry; OMA: entry
Species	Human	Mouse
Entrez	56971	319930
Ensembl	ENSG00000186567	ENSMUSG00000049848
UniProt	Q7Z692	Q3TQ88
RefSeq (mRNA)	NM_001127893; NM_020219; NM_001389722	NM_177036
RefSeq (protein)	NP_001121365; NP_064604	NP_796010
Location (UCSC)	Chr 19: 44.66 – 44.68 Mb	Chr 7: 19.61 – 19.62 Mb
PubMed search
- Wikidata
View/Edit Human	View/Edit Mouse

Carcinoembryonic antigen-related cell adhesion molecule 19 is a carcinoembryonic antigen encoded in the human by the CEACAM19 gene. The expression of this gene is associated with breast cancer and colorectal cancer
