= CEACAM3 =

Mammalian protein found in humans

Identifiers
- Aliases: CEACAM3, CD66D, CEA, CGM1, W264, W282, carcinoembryonic antigen related cell adhesion molecule 3, CEA cell adhesion molecule 3
- External IDs: OMIM: 609142; GeneCards: CEACAM3

Gene location (Human)
Chr.	Chromosome 19 (human)
Band	19q13.2	Start	41,796,587 bp
Band	19q13.2	End	41,811,554 bp
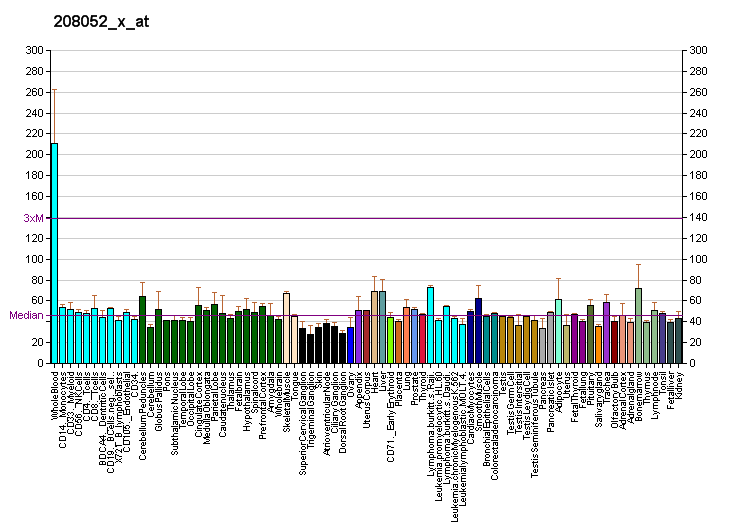

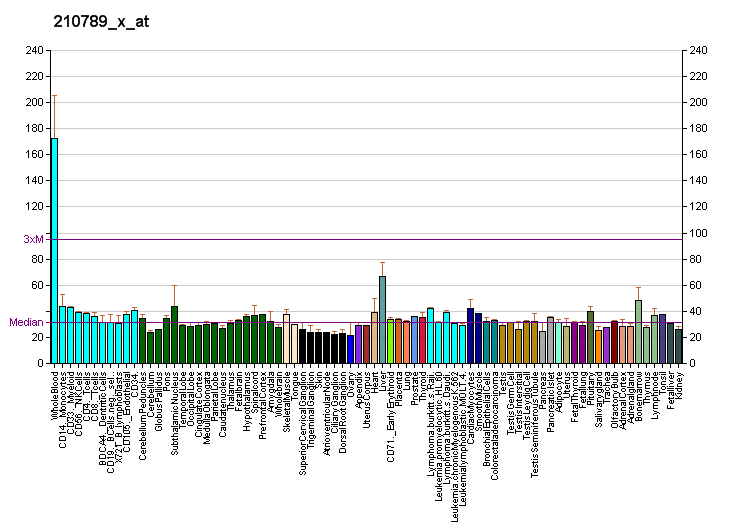
RNA expression pattern
Bgee	Human / Mouse (ortholog); Top expressed in: blood; granulocyte; bone marrow; bone marrow cell; periodontal fiber; monocyte; spleen; mucosa of transverse colon; trabecular bone; cecum / n/a; More reference expression data
BioGPS	More reference expression data
Orthologs
Databases	NCBI: entry; OMA: entry
Species	Human	Mouse
Entrez	1084	n/a
Ensembl	ENSG00000170956	n/a
UniProt	P40198	n/a
RefSeq (mRNA)	NM_001277163; NM_001815	n/a
RefSeq (protein)	NP_001264092; NP_001806	n/a
Location (UCSC)	Chr 19: 41.8 – 41.81 Mb	n/a
PubMed search		n/a
- Wikidata
View/Edit Human

Carcinoembryonic antigen-related cell adhesion molecule 3 (CEACAM3) also known as CD66d (Cluster of Differentiation 66d), is a member of the carcinoembryonic antigen (CEA) gene family..

This gene encodes a member of the family of carcinoembryonic antigen-related cell adhesion molecules (CEACAMs), which are used by several bacterial pathogens to bind and invade host cells. The encoded transmembrane protein directs phagocytosis of several bacterial species that is dependent on the small GTPase Rac. It is thought to serve an important role in controlling human-specific pathogens by the innate immune system. Alternatively spliced transcript variants have been described, but their biological validity has not been determined.

== Use ==
CEACAM3 is expressed exclusively on granulocytes and used as granulocyte marker.

== See also ==
- Cluster of differentiation
