= Carcinoembryonic antigen =

Biochemistry concept

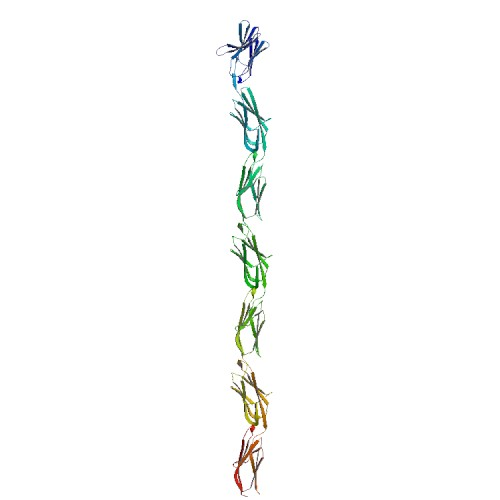
- Structure of extracellular domains of CEACAM based on 1e07

Identifiers
- Symbol: CEACAM
- Membranome: 211

Carcinoembryonic antigen (CEA) describes a set of highly-related glycoproteins involved in cell adhesion. CEA is normally produced in gastrointestinal tissue during fetal development, but the production stops before birth. Consequently, CEA is usually present at very low levels in the blood of healthy adults (about 2–4 ng/mL). However, the serum levels are raised in some types of cancer, which means that it can be used as a tumor marker in clinical tests. Serum levels can also be elevated in heavy smokers.

CEA are glycosyl phosphatidyl inositol (GPI) cell-surface-anchored glycoproteins whose specialized sialo fucosylated glycoforms serve as functional colon carcinoma L-selectin and E-selectin ligands, which may be critical to the metastatic dissemination of colon carcinoma cells. Immunologically they are characterized as members of the CD66 cluster of differentiation. The proteins include CD66a, CD66b, CD66c, CD66d, CD66e, CD66f.

== History ==
CEA was first identified in 1965 by Phil Gold, a Canadian physician, scientist and professor and Samuel O. Freedman who is also a Canadian professor of immunology in human colon cancer tissue extracts.

== Diagnostic significance ==
The CEA blood test is not reliable for diagnosing cancer or as a screening test for early detection of cancer. Most types of cancer do not result in a high CEA level.

Serum from individuals with colorectal carcinoma often has higher levels of CEA than healthy individuals (above approximately 2.5 ng/mL). CEA measurement is mainly used as a tumor marker to monitor colorectal carcinoma treatment, to identify recurrences after surgical resection, for staging or to localize cancer spread through measurement of biological fluids. CEA levels may also be raised in gastric carcinoma, pancreatic carcinoma, lung carcinoma, breast carcinoma, and medullary thyroid carcinoma, as well as some non-neoplastic conditions like ulcerative colitis, pancreatitis, cirrhosis, COPD, Crohn's disease, hypothyroidism as well as in smokers. Elevated CEA levels should return to normal after successful surgical removal of the tumor and can be used in follow up, especially of colorectal cancers.

CEA elevation is known to be affected by multiple factors. It varies inversely with tumor grade; well-differentiated tumors secrete more CEA. CEA is elevated more in tumors with lymph node and distant metastasis than in organ-confined tumors and, thus, varies directly with tumor stage. Left-sided tumors generally tend to have higher CEA levels than right-sided tumors. Tumors causing bowel obstruction produce higher CEA levels. Aneuploid tumors produce more CEA than diploid tumors. Liver dysfunction increases CEA levels as the liver is the primary site of CEA metabolism.

=== Antibodies ===
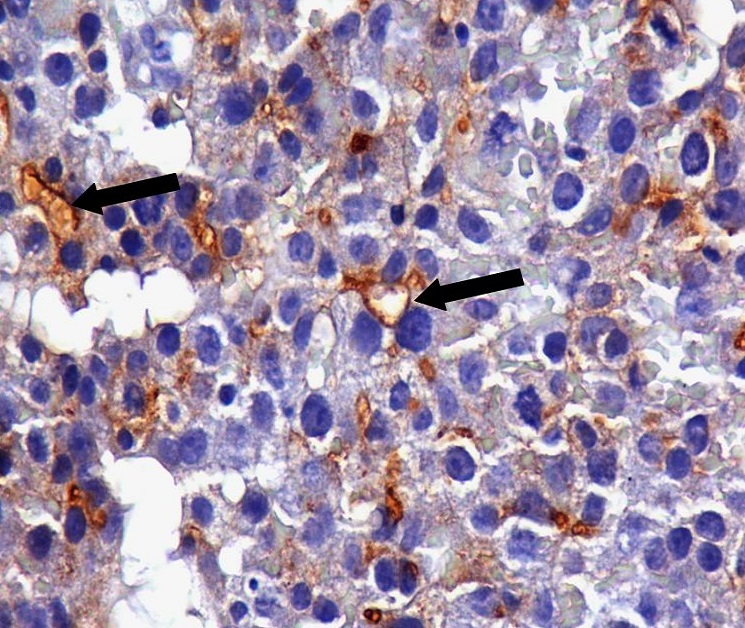
Immunohistochemistry using antibodies against CEA in a hepatocellular carcinoma, showing the typical canalicular pattern

An anti-CEA antibody is an antibody against CEA. Such antibodies to CEA are commonly used in immunohistochemistry to identify cells expressing the glycoprotein in tissue samples. In adults, CEA is primarily expressed in cells of tumors (some malignant, some benign) but they are particularly associated with the adenocarcinomas, such as those arising in the colon, lung, breast, stomach, or pancreas. It can therefore be used to distinguish between these and other similar cancers. For example, it can help to distinguish between adenocarcinoma of the lung and mesothelioma, a different type of lung cancer which is not normally CEA positive. Because even monoclonal antibodies to CEA tend to have some degree of cross-reactivity, occasionally giving false positive results, it is commonly employed in combination with other immunohistochemistry tests, such as those for BerEp4, WT1, and calretinin. For cancers that highly express CEA, targeting CEA through radioimmunotherapy is one of the therapy approaches. Engineered antibodies such as single-chain Fv antibodies (sFvs) or bispecific antibodies have been used for targeting and therapy of CEA expressing tumors both in vitro and in vivo with promising results. Regions of high CEA levels in the body can be detected with the monoclonal antibody arcitumomab.

== Genetics ==
CEA and related genes make up the CEA family belonging to the immunoglobulin superfamily.

In humans, the carcinoembryonic antigen family consists of 29 genes, 18 of which are normally expressed. The following is a list of human genes which encode carcinoembryonic antigen-related cell adhesion proteins: CEACAM1, CEACAM3, CEACAM4, CEACAM5, CEACAM6, CEACAM7, CEACAM8, CEACAM16, CEACAM18, CEACAM19, CEACAM20, CEACAM21.

== Clinical trials ==
CEA is expressed in many different types of cancer like lung, gastric, pancreatic and colorectal cancer. Many clinical trials have been performed.

CEA is used as tumor biomarker that can be used for Targeted Radionuclide Therapy. The cT84.66 is a chimeric antibody of murine origin that has been tested in phase I clinical trials with 111-In and 90-Yttrium. 111-In and 90-Y are β- emitters that are used in clinics for imaging and therapy respectively. The results were promising but a number of patients demonstrated immune responses and they had to withdraw from participating in the clinical trial. The cT84.66 antibody was huminized and in 2020, a phase I clinical trial was performed during which 18 cancer patients received an injection of 90Y-DOTA-M5A. The results of this trial demonstrated a stable disease for 10/18 patients (56%) and had no immunogenic response.

M5A-DOTA was coupled with 225-Ac, which is an alpa emitter, and an in vivo study was performed where cytokine therapy was combined with a-therapy. The result of the study revealed the benefit of combining these two treatments. Based on the results of this study, an ongoing clinical phase I study is currently underway (NCT05204147). The goal of this study is to establish the safety level and THE possible benefit of administrating M5A-DOTA-225-Ac.

== See also ==
- List of histologic stains that aid in diagnosis of cutaneous conditions
