= CEACAM16 =

Protein-coding gene in the species Homo sapiens

Identifiers
- Aliases: CEACAM16, CEAL2, DFNA4B, carcinoembryonic antigen related cell adhesion molecule 16, DFNB113, CEA cell adhesion molecule 16, tectorial membrane component
- External IDs: OMIM: 614591; MGI: 2685615; GeneCards: CEACAM16

Gene location (Human)
Chr.	Chromosome 19 (human)
Band	19q13.31-q13.32	Start	44,699,151 bp
Band	19q13.31-q13.32	End	44,710,718 bp

Gene location (Mouse)
Chr.	Chromosome 7 (mouse)
Band	7|7 A3	Start	19,586,022 bp
Band	7|7 A3	End	19,595,224 bp
RNA expression pattern
Bgee	Human / Mouse (ortholog); Top expressed in: mucosa of large intestine; body of pancreas; mucosa of transverse colon; right adrenal cortex; left adrenal cortex; liver; right lobe of liver; tonsil; skeletal muscle; muscle of leg / Top expressed in: inner ear; granulocyte; blastocyst; spleen; cerebellar cortex; adrenal gland; thymus; hippocampus proper; hypothalamus; primary visual cortex; More reference expression data
BioGPS	n/a
Gene ontology
Molecular function	identical protein binding
Cellular component	stereocilium tip; extracellular region; extracellular space
Biological process	hearing
Sources:Amigo / QuickGO
Orthologs
Databases	NCBI: entry; OMA: entry
Species	Human	Mouse
Entrez	388551	330483
Ensembl	ENSG00000213892	ENSMUSG00000014686
UniProt	Q2WEN9	E9QA28
RefSeq (mRNA)	NM_001039213	NM_001033419
RefSeq (protein)	NP_001034302	NP_001028591
Location (UCSC)	Chr 19: 44.7 – 44.71 Mb	Chr 7: 19.59 – 19.6 Mb
PubMed search
- Wikidata
View/Edit Human	View/Edit Mouse

Carcinoembryonic antigen-related cell adhesion molecule 16 is encoded in the human by the CEACAM16 gene. It is a member of the carcinoembryonic antigen family, a cluster of genes on chromosome 19. CEACAM16 is a structure of the tectorial membrane involved in hearing at low and high frequencies. It is the only carcinoembryonic antigen found in the platypus. The protein is expressed in mammalian outer hair cells, and mutations in this gene are associated with autosomal dominant nonsyndromic deafness.
