= CEACAM6 =

Mammalian protein found in Homo sapiens

Identifiers
- Aliases: CEACAM6, CD66c, CEAL, NCA, carcinoembryonic antigen related cell adhesion molecule 6, CEA cell adhesion molecule 6
- External IDs: OMIM: 163980; GeneCards: CEACAM6
Available structures
PDB	Human UniProt search: PDBe RCSB
PDB	List of PDB id codes 4WTZ, 4WHC, 4YIQ, 4Y8A

Gene location (Human)
Chr.	Chromosome 19 (human)
Band	19q13.2	Start	41,750,977 bp
Band	19q13.2	End	41,772,211 bp
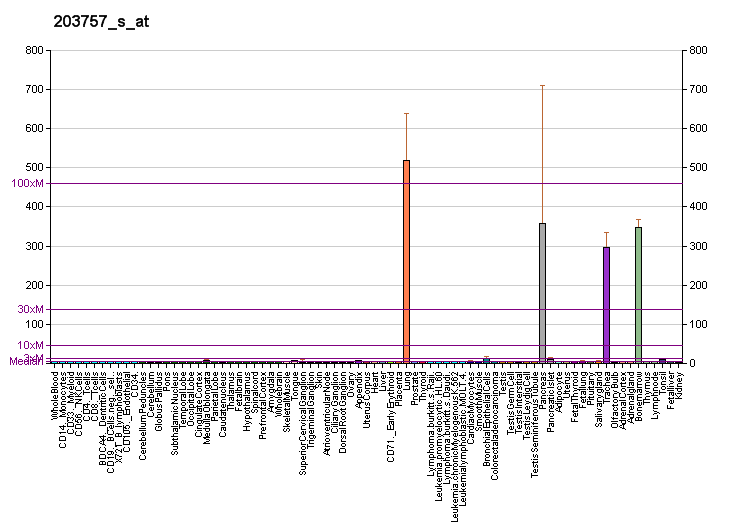

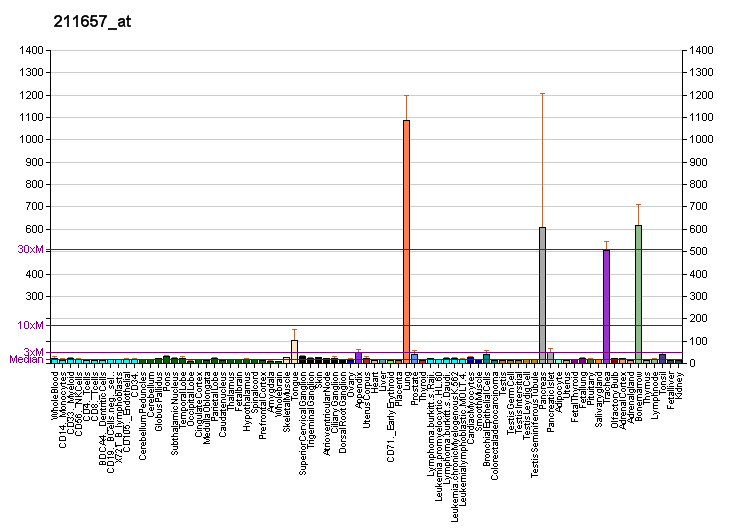
RNA expression pattern
Bgee	Human / Mouse (ortholog); Top expressed in: pancreatic ductal cell; palpebral conjunctiva; nasal epithelium; mucosa of colon; mucosa of sigmoid colon; lower lobe of lung; mucosa of pharynx; epithelium of bronchus; trabecular bone; bronchial epithelial cell / n/a; More reference expression data
BioGPS	More reference expression data
Gene ontology
Molecular function	protein binding; identical protein binding; protein heterodimerization activity
Cellular component	plasma membrane; integral component of plasma membrane; membrane; extracellular space; azurophil granule membrane; cell surface; apical plasma membrane; anchored component of membrane
Biological process	cell-cell signaling; leukocyte migration; positive regulation of cell population proliferation; positive regulation of cell migration; neutrophil degranulation; homophilic cell adhesion via plasma membrane adhesion molecules; heterophilic cell-cell adhesion via plasma membrane cell adhesion molecules; signal transduction; positive regulation of heterotypic cell-cell adhesion; positive regulation of endothelial cell-matrix adhesion via fibronectin; negative regulation of anoikis; apoptotic process; cell adhesion
Sources:Amigo / QuickGO
Orthologs
Databases	NCBI: entry; OMA: entry
Species	Human	Mouse
Entrez	4680	n/a
Ensembl	ENSG00000086548	n/a
UniProt	P40199	n/a
RefSeq (mRNA)	NM_002483	n/a
RefSeq (protein)	NP_002474	n/a
Location (UCSC)	Chr 19: 41.75 – 41.77 Mb	n/a
PubMed search		n/a
- Wikidata
View/Edit Human

Carcinoembryonic antigen-related cell adhesion molecule 6 (non-specific cross reacting antigen) (CEACAM6) also known as CD66c (Cluster of Differentiation 66c), is a member of the carcinoembryonic antigen (CEA) gene family..

== See also ==
- Cluster of differentiation
