= HLA-DQB3 =

major histocompatibility complex, class II, DQ beta 3

Identifiers
- Symbol: HLA-DQB3
- Alt. symbols: HLA-DVB
- NCBI gene: 3121
- HGNC: 4946
- UniProt: O78219

Other data
- Locus: Chr. 6 p21.3
Search for
- Structures: Swiss-model
- Domains: InterPro

Major histocompatibility complex, class II, DQ beta 3, also known as HLA-DQB3, is a human gene and also denotes the genetic locus which contains this gene. While the overall sequence of the protein encoded by this gene is similar to other HLA class II beta chains, the translated protein is lacking several domains and therefore it is not clear that this gene encodes a functional protein.

== See also ==
- Major histocompatibility complex
- Human leukocyte antigen
- HLA-DQ
