= Interleukin 30 =

Protein-coding gene in the species Homo sapiens

IL27

Identifiers
- Aliases: IL27, IL-27, IL-27A, IL27A, IL27p28, IL30, p28, Interleukin 30, IL-30, interleukin 27
- External IDs: OMIM: 608273; MGI: 2384409; HomoloGene: 17087; GeneCards: IL27; OMA:IL27 - orthologs

Gene location (Human)
Chr.	Chromosome 16 (human)
Band	16p12.1-p11.2	Start	28,499,362 bp
Band	16p12.1-p11.2	End	28,512,051 bp

Gene location (Mouse)
Chr.	Chromosome 7 (mouse)
Band	7|7 F3	Start	126,188,182 bp
Band	7|7 F3	End	126,194,113 bp
RNA expression pattern
Bgee	Human / Mouse (ortholog); Top expressed in: right lobe of liver; monocyte; granulocyte; gonad; apex of heart; blood; spleen; appendix; upper lobe of left lung; mucosa of transverse colon / Top expressed in: granulocyte; bone marrow; ileum; jejunum; spleen; zone of skin; thymus; colon; lung; islet of Langerhans; More reference expression data
BioGPS	n/a
Gene ontology
Molecular function	cytokine activity; interleukin-27 receptor binding; signaling receptor binding; protein binding
Cellular component	extracellular region; extracellular space; endoplasmic reticulum lumen; cytosol
Biological process	innate immune response; inflammatory response; regulation of T-helper 1 cell differentiation; regulation of defense response to virus; response to bacterium; immune system process; regulation of T cell proliferation; positive regulation of defense response to virus by host; regulation of signaling receptor activity; interleukin-27-mediated signaling pathway
Sources:Amigo / QuickGO
Orthologs
Species	Human	Mouse
Entrez	246778	246779
Ensembl	ENSG00000197272	ENSMUSG00000044701
UniProt	Q8NEV9	Q8K3I6
RefSeq (mRNA)	NM_145659	NM_145636
RefSeq (protein)	NP_663634	NP_663611
Location (UCSC)	Chr 16: 28.5 – 28.51 Mb	Chr 7: 126.19 – 126.19 Mb
PubMed search
- Wikidata
View/Edit Human	View/Edit Mouse

Interleukin 30 (IL-30) forms one chain of the heterodimeric cytokine called interleukin 27 (IL-27), thus it is also called IL27-p28. IL-27 is composed of α chain p28 and β chain Epstain-Barr induce gene-3 (EBI3). The p28 subunit, or IL-30, has an important role as a part of IL-27, but it can be secreted as a separate monomer and has its own functions in the absence of EBI3. The discovery of IL-30 as individual cytokine is relatively new and thus its role in the modulation of the immune response is not fully understood.

== Function ==
IL-30 monomer is believed to have some functions similar to IL-27, even though there are more information and research on the IL-27 than IL-30. Both IL-27 and IL-30 alone can regulate inflammation by inhibiting Th17 cells production using STAT1 pathway. Although IL-30 has similar effect as IL-27 on the production of IL-17, it has a lower efficiency than IL-27. If secreted as a monomer, IL-30 was observed to act as a suppressor of the IL-27 signalling pathway. Similar to subunit p40 of IL-12 which competitively bind to IL-12 receptor (IL-12R) complex, IL-30 most likely binds to IL-27 receptor (IL-27R) receptor and thus prevents the binding of IL-27. Since part of IL-27R is subunit gp130, which is also part of IL-6R, IL-30 can also act as an antagonist for IL-6 and thus suppress the production of Th17 and Th1 cells. Receptor subunit gp130 plays an important role in receptors for multiple cytokines, there is a possibility that IL-30 can affect also other cytokine signalling.

IL-30 can also form an alternative heterodimer with the EBI3 homolog cytokine-like factor 1 (CLF) called p28/CLF. This complex is produced by dendritic cells. p28/CLF binds to IL-6Rα and gp130 subunits of IL-6 receptor. It stimulates NK cells and thus increases production of IFN-γ. It can also induce production of IgG1c, IgG2c and IgM.

Artificially, IL-30 can form a heterodimer with p40 β chain of IL-12 creating novel recombinant protein p28/p40 that is biologically active, which suggest the α and β chains of cytokines from IL-12 family may form different heterodimers in nature. This recombinant protein has suppressive effect on Th17 cells that comes from inhibiting the activation of STAT1 and STAT3 pathways, which are normally induced through gp130 receptor by IL-6 and IL-27. p28/p40 also inhibits the expansion of Th1 cells. Both of those functions could potentially be beneficial in treatment of some autoimmune diseases.

It has been indicated that IL-30 plays a role in the regulation of prostate and breast cancer. It is linked with tumor progression as well as metastasization.

== Structure ==
IL-30 is a protein from the IL-6 cytokine family with molecular weight of 28 kilodaltons (thus the name IL27-p28). It is a member of the long-chain, 4-helix bundle family of cytokines, making it structurally similar to IL-6.

The human gene for IL-30 is located on chromosome 16p11. This gene for this molecule is now officially called IL-27 under HGNC guidelines.

== Cancer ==
IL-30 was found to be expressed in prostate and breast cancer by both cancer cells and tumor- or LN-infiltrating leukocytes, mostly myeloid cells, particularly in high-grade and stage of the diseases.

=== Prostate cancer ===
Recent studies provided evidence that IL-30 is implicated in prostate cancer progression. IL-30, absent in normal prostatic epithelia, was found to be expressed by cancerous epithelia. IL-30 expression by prostate cancer epithelia and leukocytes infiltrating tumor and draining lymph nodes correlates with high-grade and advanced-stage prostate cancer.

IL-30 promotes prostate cancer stem-like cells viability, self-renewal ability, tumorigenic and metastatic potential, it regulates, essentially via STAT1 and STAT3 signaling, a range of proinflammatory and chemokine/chemokine-receptor genes that promote tumor growth.

IL-30 is emerging as a new and intriguing factor that may condition prostate cancer onset and progression. It is produced by tumor-infiltrating leukocytes, mostly myeloid derived cells.

Discrimination of molecular pathways driving tumor growth and progression is important to identify novel prognostic markers and targets for new posibble treatments. Revealing that IL-30 displays cancer-promoting effects, strongly nominate this cytokine as a novel molecule shaping the tumor and lymph node microenvironment.

IL30 plays an important role in regulating prostate cancer stem-like cell behavior and metastatic potential. Hence targeting IL-30 signaling may be a potential therapeutic strategy against prostate cancer progression and recurrence.

Targeting IL-30 in both cancer and host environment consistently inhibits tumor growth, ameliorates immune reactivity and reduces the risks of disease recurrence. Studies suggested therapeutic monoclonal antibodies against IL-30 as a for cancer treatment.

=== Breast cancer ===
IL-30 was identified as a cytokine able to condition, in an autocrine or paracrine manner, gene expression profile, at times the viability, motility, and invasiveness of breast cancer cells and to generate an inflammatory and prometastatic milieu supporting tumor growth and progression.

High levels of IL-30 in myeloid derived cells of tumor-draining lymph nodes from breast cancer patients have also proven to be an independent predictor of poor prognosis, thus suggesting the involvement of IL-30, produced by the host's immune cells, in conditioning tumor behavior and patient outcome.

Directly and/or by subverting multiple oncogenes and tumor suppressor genes, IL-30 favors cancer cell proliferation, migration, and dissemination. That may boost cancer cell expression of cytokines and chemokines, which promote myeloid cell recruitment and tumor progression.

High level of IL-30 in breast cancer draining lymph nodes is an independent predictor of poor clinical outcome. Identification of IL-30 in breast and draining lymph nodes may provide a new prognostic tool and target for a tailored breast cancer therapy in the emerging era of personalized medicine.

== Therapeutic use ==
IL-30, or a heterodimer p28/p40, could potentially be used as an immunosuppressant for autoimmune and severe systematic inflammatory diseases. IL-30 could also be a potential target for cancer treatment.
