= CEACAM7 =

Protein-coding gene in the species Homo sapiens

Identifiers
- Aliases: CEACAM7, CEA, CGM2, carcinoembryonic antigen related cell adhesion molecule 7, CEA cell adhesion molecule 7
- External IDs: GeneCards: CEACAM7
Available structures
PDB	Human UniProt search: PDBe RCSB
PDB	List of PDB id codes 4Y89

Gene location (Human)
Chr.	Chromosome 19 (human)
Band	19q13.2	Start	41,673,303 bp
Band	19q13.2	End	41,706,976 bp
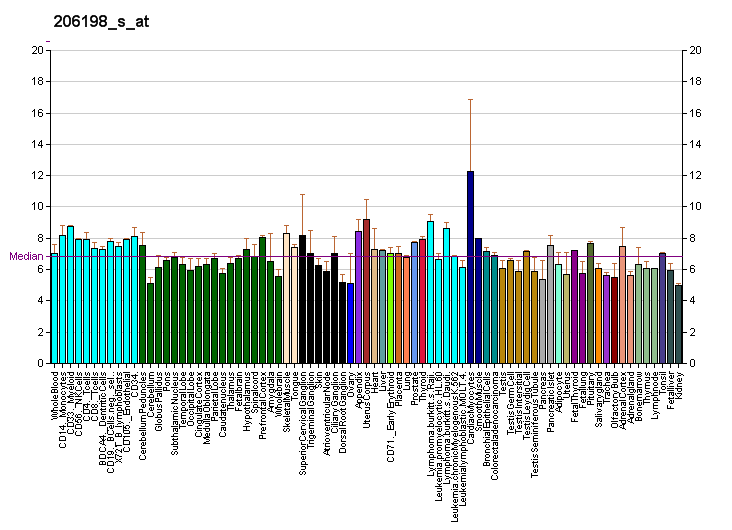

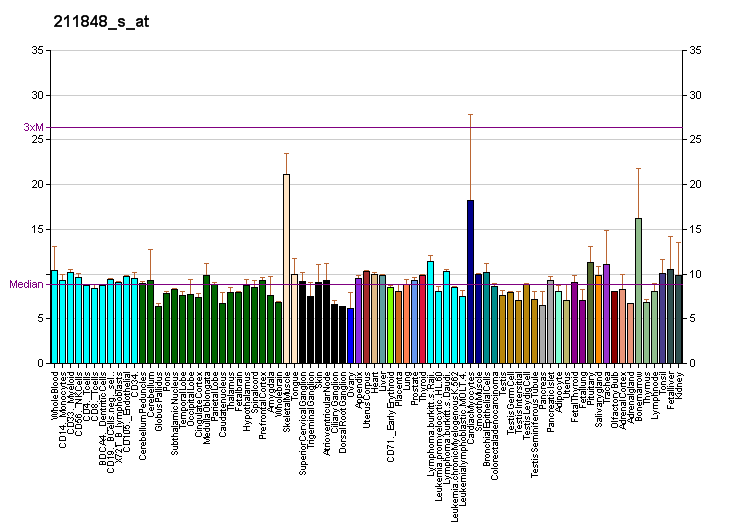

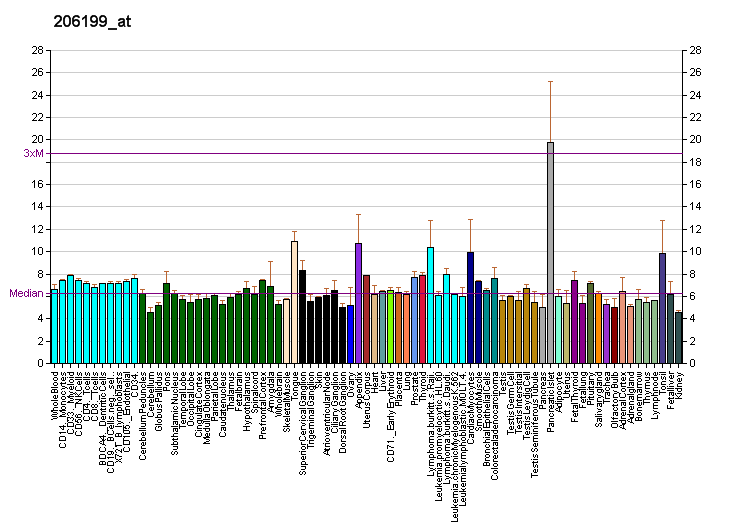
RNA expression pattern
Bgee	Human / Mouse (ortholog); Top expressed in: mucosa of transverse colon; rectum; mucosa of sigmoid colon; mucosa of ileum; appendix; islet of Langerhans; gallbladder; testicle; palpebral conjunctiva; vagina / n/a; More reference expression data
BioGPS	More reference expression data
Orthologs
Databases	NCBI: entry; OMA: entry
Species	Human	Mouse
Entrez	1087	n/a
Ensembl	ENSG00000280501; ENSG00000007306	n/a
UniProt	Q14002	n/a
RefSeq (mRNA)	NM_006890; NM_001291485	n/a
RefSeq (protein)	NP_001278414; NP_008821	n/a
Location (UCSC)	Chr 19: 41.67 – 41.71 Mb	n/a
PubMed search		n/a
- Wikidata
View/Edit Human

Carcinoembryonic antigen-related cell adhesion molecule 7 is a protein that in humans is encoded by the CEACAM7 gene.
