= Integrin alpha V =

Mammalian protein found in Homo sapiens

ITGAV
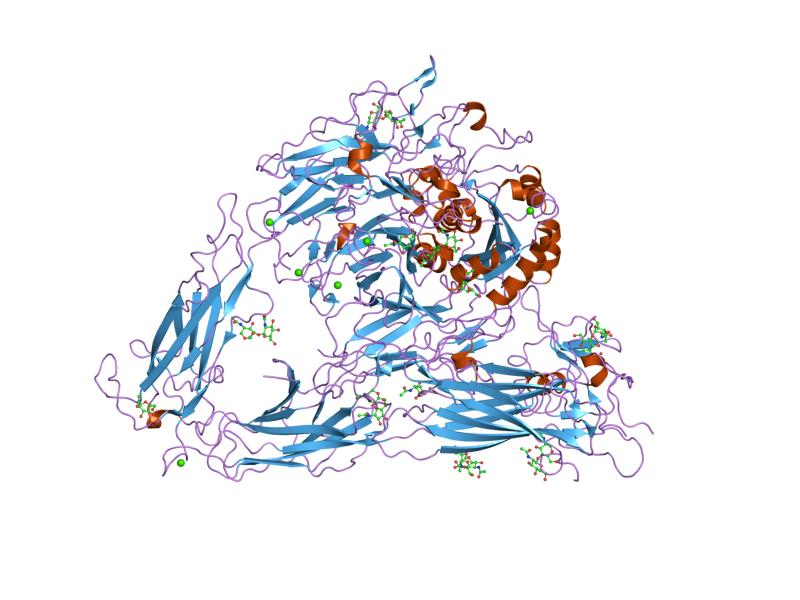

Identifiers
- Aliases: ITGAV, CD51, MSK8, VNRA, VTNR, integrin subunit alpha V
- External IDs: OMIM: 193210; MGI: 96608; GeneCards: ITGAV
Available structures
PDB	Ortholog search: H0WK80%20or%20H7BZG1 PDBe H0WK80,H7BZG1 RCSB
PDB	List of PDB id codes 1JV2, 1L5G, 1M1X, 1U8C, 3IJE, 4G1E, 4G1M, 4MMX, 4MMY, 4MMZ, 4O02, 4UM8, 4UM9

Gene location (Human)
Chr.	Chromosome 2 (human)
Band	2q32.1	Start	186,590,056 bp
Band	2q32.1	End	186,680,901 bp

Gene location (Mouse)
Chr.	Chromosome 2 (mouse)
Band	2 D|2 49.33 cM	Start	83,554,741 bp
Band	2 D|2 49.33 cM	End	83,637,260 bp
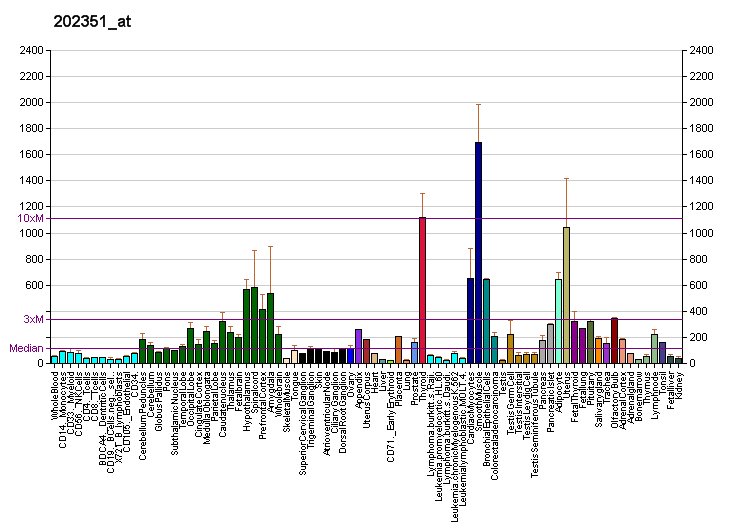
RNA expression pattern
Bgee	Human / Mouse (ortholog); Top expressed in: retinal pigment epithelium; Epithelium of choroid plexus; germinal epithelium; tibia; right ventricle; skin of hip; visceral pleura; glomerulus; metanephric glomerulus; parietal pleura / Top expressed in: cumulus cell; retinal pigment epithelium; renal corpuscle; conjunctival fornix; decidua; calvaria; epithelium of lens; body of femur; gastrula; external carotid artery; More reference expression data
BioGPS	More reference expression data
Gene ontology
Molecular function	transforming growth factor beta binding; metal ion binding; voltage-gated calcium channel activity; virus receptor activity; protein kinase C binding; protease binding; extracellular matrix protein binding; extracellular matrix binding; fibronectin binding; opsonin binding; insulin-like growth factor I binding; protein binding; fibroblast growth factor binding; neuregulin binding; coreceptor activity; C-X3-C chemokine binding; signaling receptor binding; peptide binding; integrin binding
Cellular component	lamellipodium membrane; integrin alphav-beta3 complex; extracellular exosome; alphav-beta3 integrin-IGF-1-IGF1R complex; integral component of membrane; integrin alphav-beta5 complex; membrane; integrin alphav-beta8 complex; ruffle membrane; integrin complex; microvillus membrane; filopodium membrane; external side of plasma membrane; phagocytic vesicle; plasma membrane; integral component of plasma membrane; cell surface; cytosol; focal adhesion; cell junction; specific granule membrane; integrin alphav-beta6 complex; alphav-beta3 integrin-PKCalpha complex; alphav-beta3 integrin-HMGB1 complex
Biological process	regulation of phagocytosis; apoptotic cell clearance; endodermal cell differentiation; apolipoprotein A-I-mediated signaling pathway; negative chemotaxis; negative regulation of lipid storage; extracellular matrix organization; heterotypic cell-cell adhesion; positive regulation of cell migration; regulation of apoptotic cell clearance; substrate adhesion-dependent cell spreading; vascular endothelial growth factor receptor signaling pathway; cell-matrix adhesion; viral process; antigen processing and presentation of exogenous peptide antigen via MHC class I, TAP-dependent; blood vessel development; negative regulation of entry of bacterium into host cell; integrin-mediated signaling pathway; calcium ion transmembrane transport; negative regulation of macrophage derived foam cell differentiation; negative regulation of extrinsic apoptotic signaling pathway; leukocyte migration; cell-substrate adhesion; negative regulation of lipoprotein metabolic process; negative regulation of lipid transport; extrinsic apoptotic signaling pathway in absence of ligand; positive regulation of cell adhesion; ERK1 and ERK2 cascade; cell growth; positive regulation of osteoblast proliferation; cell adhesion; angiogenesis; vasculogenesis; cellular calcium ion homeostasis; positive regulation of cytosolic calcium ion concentration; positive regulation of cell population proliferation; cell migration; neutrophil degranulation; positive regulation of MAPK cascade; cell adhesion mediated by integrin; viral entry into host cell; regulation of transforming growth factor beta activation
Sources:Amigo / QuickGO
Orthologs
Databases	NCBI: entry; OMA: entry
Species	Human	Mouse
Entrez	3685	16410
Ensembl	ENSG00000138448	ENSMUSG00000027087
UniProt	P06756	P43406
RefSeq (mRNA)	NM_001144999; NM_001145000; NM_002210	NM_008402; NM_001398691
RefSeq (protein)	NP_001138471; NP_001138472; NP_002201	NP_032428; NP_001385620
Location (UCSC)	Chr 2: 186.59 – 186.68 Mb	Chr 2: 83.55 – 83.64 Mb
PubMed search
- Wikidata
View/Edit Human	View/Edit Mouse

Integrin alpha-V is a protein that in humans is encoded by the ITGAV gene.

== Function ==
ITGAV encodes integrin alpha chain V. Integrins are heterodimeric integral membrane proteins composed of an alpha chain and a beta chain. Alpha V undergoes post-translational cleavage to yield disulfide-linked heavy and light chains, that combine with multiple integrin beta chains to form different integrins. Among the known associating beta chains (beta chains 1,3,5,6, and 8; ITGB1, ITGB3, ITGB5, ITGB6, and ITGB8), each can interact with extracellular matrix ligands; the alpha V beta 3 integrin, perhaps the most studied of these, is referred to as the Vitronectin receptor (VNR). In addition to adhesion, many integrins are known to facilitate signal transduction.

== Alpha V class integrins ==
In mammals the integrins that include alpha-V are :

Name	Synonyms	Distribution	Ligands
α_{V}β_{1}		neurological tumors	vitronectin; fibrinogen
α_{V}β_{3}	vitronectin receptor	activated endothelial cells, melanoma, glioblastoma	vitronectin, fibronectin, fibrinogen, osteopontin, Cyr61, thyroxine
α_{V}β_{5}		widespread, esp. fibroblasts, epithelial cells	vitronectin and adenovirus
α_{V}β_{6}		proliferating epithelia, esp. lung and mammary gland	fibronectin; TGFβ1+3
α_{V}β_{8}		neural tissue; peripheral nerve	fibronectin; TGFβ1+3

== Clinical significance ==
Overexpression of the ITGAV gene is associated with progression and spread of colorectal cancer, and prostate cancer.

== As a drug target ==
The mAbs intetumumab, and abituzumab target this protein which is found on some tumour cells.

== See also ==
- Cluster of differentiation
