= Fibronectin type II domain =

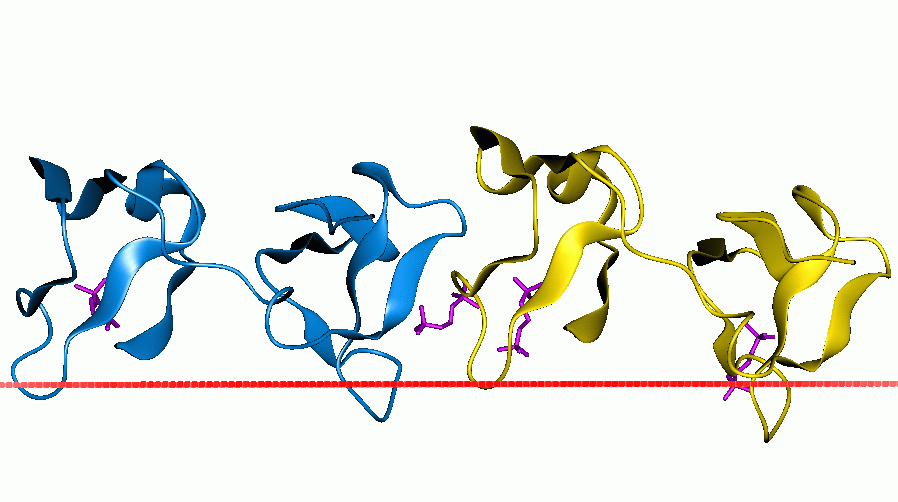
- Collagen-binding type II domain of seminal plasma protein PDC-109.

Identifiers
- Symbol: fn2
- Pfam: PF00040
- InterPro: IPR000562
- SMART: SM00059
- PROSITE: PDOC00022
- SCOP2: 1pdc / SCOPe / SUPFAM
- OPM superfamily: 115
- OPM protein: 1h8p
- CDD: cd00062
Available protein structures:
- Pfam: structures / ECOD
- PDB: RCSB PDB; PDBe; PDBj
- PDBsum: structure summary

Fibronectin type II domain is a collagen-binding protein domain. Fibronectin is a multi-domain glycoprotein, found in a soluble form in plasma, and in an insoluble form in loose connective tissue and basement membranes, that binds cell surfaces and various compounds including collagen, fibrin, heparin, DNA, and actin. Fibronectins are involved in a number of important functions e.g., wound healing; cell adhesion; blood coagulation; cell differentiation and migration; maintenance of the cellular cytoskeleton; and tumour metastasis. The major part of the sequence of fibronectin consists of the repetition of three types of domains, which are called type I, II, and III.

Type II domain is approximately sixty amino acids long, contains four conserved cysteines involved in disulfide bonds and is part of the collagen-binding region of fibronectin. Type II domains occur two times in fibronectin. Type II domains have also been found in a range of proteins including blood coagulation factor XII; bovine seminal plasma proteins PDC-109 (BSP-A1/A2) and BSP-A3; cation-independent mannose-6-phosphate receptor; mannose receptor of macrophages; 180 Kd secretory phospholipase A2 receptor; DEC-205 receptor; 72 Kd and 92 Kd type IV collagenase (EC 3.4.24.24); and hepatocyte growth factor activator.

== Fibronectin type II domain and Lipid bilayer interaction ==
Fibronectin type II domain is part of the extracellular portions of EphA2 receptor proteins. FN2 domain on EphA2 receptors bears positively-charged components, namely K441 and R443, which attract and almost exclusively bind to anionic lipids such as anionic membrane lipid phosphatidylglycerol. K441 and R443 together make up a membrane-binding motif that allows EphA2 receptors to attach to the cell membrane.

== Human proteins containing this domain ==
BSPH1; ELSPBP1; F12; FN1; HGFAC; IGF2R; LY75; MMP2; MMP9; MRC1; MRC1L1; MRC2; PLA2R1; SEL1L;

- Fibronectin type I domain: F12; FN1; HGFAC; PLAT;
