= Abituzumab =

Monoclonal antibody

Monoclonal antibody
- Type: Whole antibody
- Source: Humanized
- Target: CD51

Clinical data
- ATC code: none

Identifiers
- CAS Number: 1105038-73-0
- ChemSpider: none
- UNII: 724QD330RD

Abituzumab is a humanized IgG2 monoclonal antibody (mAb) targeted at CD51 (an integrin) currently in development by Merck KGaA Darmstadt, Germany in an attempt to prevent bone lesion metastases in castration-resistant prostate cancer.

== Pharmacology ==
=== Pharmacokinetics ===
Early results from clinical trials show that there are no severe dose-dependent adverse effects up to 1500 mg IV administration of Abituzumab. Maximum serum concentrations were observed one to two hours after the onset of administration, with a Cmax that increased proportionally with dose. Serum half-life is also dose-dependent, at 35 mg the half-life is 19.3 hours, and at 1500 mg half-life is 246.1 hours. Clearance of Abituzumab began to stabilize at 250 mg, which may suggest saturable first-order elimination kinetics. Volume of distribution remained constant between 4.1 - 5.9 L at all doses of Abituzumab, which indicates minimal distribution in the tissue. Anti-abituzumab antibodies were observed in 19% of patients, however, researchers believe the development of these antibodies did not alter the pharmacokinetic profile of Abituzumab.

== Society and culture ==
In 2014 Merck KGaA acquired Sigma-Aldrich Corp. for approximately $17 billion. Before the acquisition, Sigma-Aldrich Corp. primarily produced laboratory testing and research materials. During the purchase, Merck KGaA agreed to pay $140/share, which was 37% above the valued share price at the time. Merck KGaA cited the purchase as an opportunity to increase their platform of novel drug discovery. In a 2015 Annual Report, Merck KGaA proposed that the acquisition of Sigma-Aldrich Corp. would have a negative impact on earnings and net income during the 2016 fiscal year, however, they proposed no risks to jeopardize the continued existence of the company. Despite the negative impact on earnings and net income, Merck KGaA observed an 18.2% increase in net sales during the second quarter of 2016, with EBITDA pre-exceptionals rising 28.8% and EBITDA margin rising 30.4%

=== Patents ===
On December 14, 2009 Merck KGaA filed a patent application citing Abituzumab as a novel treatment and diagnostic tool for patients with tumor induced angiogenesis or another angiogenic-associated disorder. Ideally the therapy would target patients with an alteration in the expression of genes related to cell proliferation and angiogenesis.

== Research ==
=== Randomized Phase I/II POSEIDON Trial ===
This multiphase trial aimed to further evaluate the safety of tolerability of Abituzumab in combination therapy with cetuximab and irinotecan in the Phase I portion of the trial. Cetixumab, a monoclonal antibody, that targets epidermal growth factor receptor (EGFR), and irinotecan, a topoisomerase I inhibitor, can be used in combination as standard of care for treating colorectal cancer. The Phase II portion of the trial sought to compare the efficacy of Abituzumab, cetuximab, and irinotecan compared to cetuximab and irinotecan in patients with KRAS (exon 2) wild-type metastatic colorectal cancer. Patients included in the study failed treatment with oxaliplatin, and initial safety studies included comparing Abituzumab, cetuximab, and irinotecan with standard of care. The Phase I study showed that doses up to 1000 mg of Abituzumab, cetuximab, and irinotecan were well tolerated. The results of Phase II showed that the primary endpoint of progression-free survival was not met, but overall survival improved in patients receiving Abituzumab compared to standard of care. The researchers postulate that this could be due to increased expression of αvβ6 integrin in tumors.

=== Randomized Phase II PERSEUS Trial ===
Based on the positive results of the Phase I trial, an additional Phase II clinical trial investigating Abituzumab's ability to extend progression free survival (PFS) in metastatic castration-resistant prostate cancer was conducted. This trial utilized Abituzumab in combination with luteinizing hormone antagonist/agonist treatment every three weeks in patients with confirmed bone lesions in metastatic castration-resistant prostate cancer. During this study, the researchers did not see an overall improvement in prostate cancer, but they did observe a partial response in relation to the bone lesions. However, further study is warranted to determine the efficacy of Abituzumab in treating bone lesions in metastatic castration-resistant prostate cancer.
