= Alpha-v beta-5 =

α_{V}β_{5} is a type of integrin that binds to matrix macromolecules and proteinases and thereby stimulates angiogenesis. However, it inhibits angiogenesis.

It consists of two components, integrin alpha V and integrin beta 5.
