= PAK4 =

Mammalian protein found in Homo sapiens

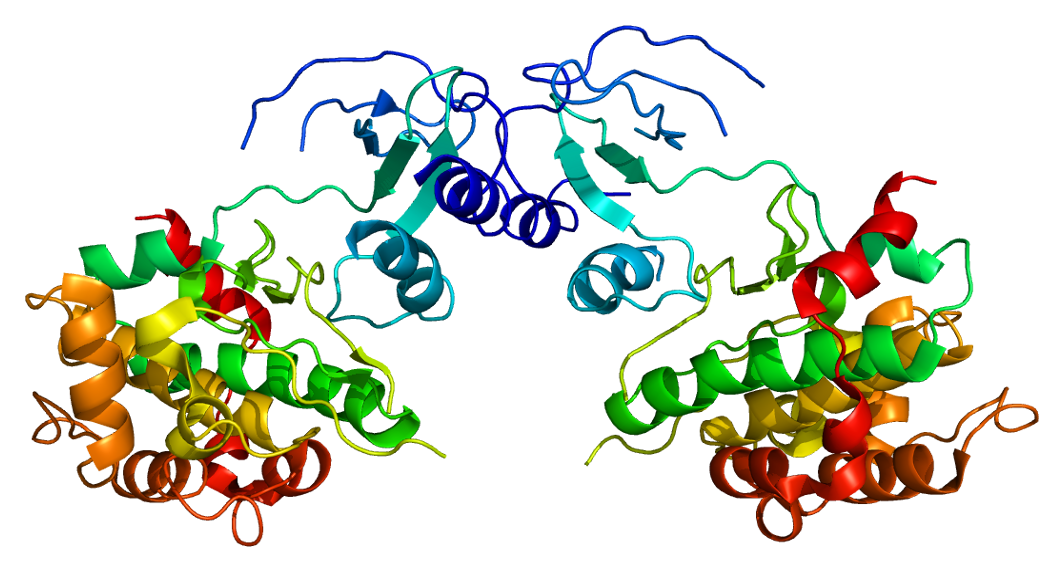

Identifiers
- Aliases: PAK4, p21 (RAC1) activated kinase 4
- External IDs: OMIM: 605451; MGI: 1917834; GeneCards: PAK4
Available structures
PDB	Ortholog search: PDBe RCSB
PDB	List of PDB id codes 2BVA, 2CDZ, 2J0I, 2OV2, 2Q0N, 2X4Z, 4APP, 4FIE, 4FIF, 4FIG, 4FIH, 4FII, 4FIJ, 4JDH, 4JDI, 4JDJ, 4JDK, 4L67, 4NJD, 4O0V, 4O0X, 4O0Y, 5BMS, 4XBU, 4XBR
Enzyme activity
EC #	BRENDA	ExPASy	KEGG	MetaCyc
2.7.11.1	↗	↗	↗	↗

Gene location (Human)
Chr.	Chromosome 19 (human)
Band	19q13.2	Start	39,125,770 bp
Band	19q13.2	End	39,182,816 bp

Gene location (Mouse)
Chr.	Chromosome 7 (mouse)
Band	7|7 A3- B1	Start	28,258,244 bp
Band	7|7 A3- B1	End	28,297,610 bp
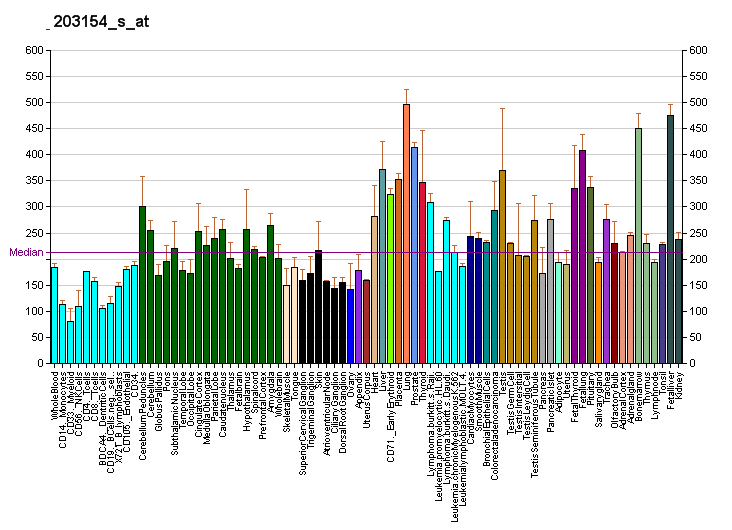

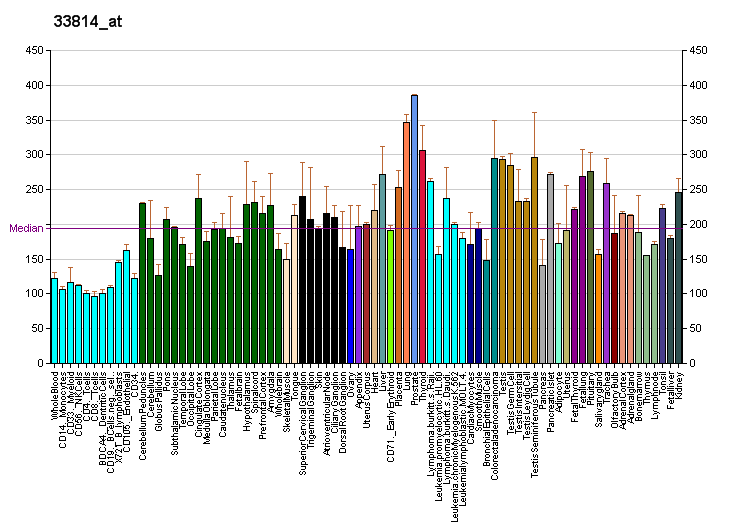
RNA expression pattern
Bgee	Human / Mouse (ortholog); Top expressed in: beta cell; olfactory bulb; thoracic diaphragm; mucosa of transverse colon; right uterine tube; right lung; parotid gland; upper lobe of left lung; myocardium of left ventricle; anterior pituitary / Top expressed in: zygote; secondary oocyte; yolk sac; epithelium of stomach; otolith organ; transitional epithelium of urinary bladder; hand; utricle; tail of embryo; primary oocyte; More reference expression data
BioGPS	More reference expression data
Gene ontology
Molecular function	transferase activity; protein kinase activity; nucleotide binding; kinase activity; protein binding; ATP binding; cadherin binding involved in cell-cell adhesion; protein serine/threonine kinase activity
Cellular component	cytoplasm; Golgi apparatus; focal adhesion
Biological process	phosphorylation; cellular response to organic cyclic compound; protein phosphorylation; cell growth; dendritic spine development; cytoskeleton organization; cell cycle; cell population proliferation; cell migration; signal transduction; apoptotic process; cell-cell adhesion; Rho protein signal transduction; regulation of mitotic cell cycle; actin cytoskeleton organization; stress-activated protein kinase signaling cascade; activation of protein kinase activity; regulation of apoptotic process; regulation of MAPK cascade; regulation of cell growth; positive regulation of angiogenesis; negative regulation of endothelial cell apoptotic process
Sources:Amigo / QuickGO
Orthologs
Databases	NCBI: entry; OMA: entry
Species	Human	Mouse
Entrez	10298	70584
Ensembl	ENSG00000130669	ENSMUSG00000030602
UniProt	O96013	Q8BTW9
RefSeq (mRNA)	NM_001014831; NM_001014832; NM_001014833; NM_001014834; NM_001014835 NM_005884; NM_001394501	NM_027470
RefSeq (protein)	NP_001014831; NP_001014832; NP_001014834; NP_001014835; NP_005875	NP_081746
Location (UCSC)	Chr 19: 39.13 – 39.18 Mb	Chr 7: 28.26 – 28.3 Mb
PubMed search
- Wikidata
View/Edit Human	View/Edit Mouse

Serine/threonine-protein kinase PAK 4 is an enzyme that in humans is encoded by the PAK4 gene.

PAK4 is one of six members of the PAK family of serine/threonine kinases which are divided into group I (PAK1, PAK2 and PAK3) and group II (PAK4, PAK6 and PAK5/7). PAK4 localizes in sub-cellular domains of the cytoplasm and nucleus. PAK4 regulates cytoskeleton remodeling, phenotypic signaling and gene expression, and affects directional motility, invasion, metastasis, and growth. Similar to PAK1, PAK4-signaling-dependent cellular functions also regulate both physiologic and disease processes such as cancer, as PAK4 is overexpressed and/or hyperstimulated in human cancer, at-large.

== Discovery ==
PAK4, the founding member of Group II PAK member, was cloned and identified by Minden A. and colleagues in 1998 using a PCR-based strategy from a cDNA library prepared from Jurkett cells.

== Gene and spliced variants ==
The group II PAKs have less coding exons compared with group I PAKs, highlights the potential structural and functional differences between two group of PAKs. The human PAK4 is about 57-kb in length with 13 exons. The PAK4 generates 12 transcripts of which 10 coding transcripts are predicted to code proteins of about 438 to 591 amino acids long, while remaining two transcripts are non-coding in nature. In contrast to human PAK4, murine PAK4 contains four transcripts - two coding for 593 amino acids long polypeptides and two are non-coding RNA transcripts.

== Protein domains ==
The core domains of PAK4 include, a kinase domain in the C-terminal region, a p21-binding domain (PBD), and a newly defined auto-inhibitory domain (AID) or an AID-like pseudosubstrate sequence (PS) domain.

== Regulation ==
PAK4 activity is stimulated by upstream activators and signals, including by HGF, PKD, PKA, CDK5RAP3, and SH3RF2.

In addition to other mechanisms, PAK4 functions are mediated though phosphorylation of its effector proteins, including, LIMK1-Thr508, integrin β5-Ser759/Ser762, p120-catenin-Ser288, superior cervical ganglia 10 (SCG10)-Ser50, GEF-H1-Ser810 β-catenin-Ser675, and Smad2-Ser465.

PAK4 and/or PAK4-dependent signals also modulate the expression of genomic targets, including p57Kip2.

== Inhibitors ==
The PAK4 activity and expression has been shown to be inhibited by chemical inhibitors such as PF-3758309, LCH-7749944, glaucarubinone, KY-04031, KY-04045, 1-phenanthryl-tetrahydroisoquinoline derivatives, (-)-β-hydrastine, Inka1, GL-1196, GNE-2861, and microRNAs such as miR-145, miR-433, and miR-126.

== Function ==
PAK proteins, a family of serine/threonine p21-activating kinases, include PAK1, PAK2, PAK3 and PAK4. PAK proteins are critical effectors that link Rho GTPases to cytoskeleton reorganization and nuclear signaling. They serve as targets for the small GTP binding proteins Cdc42 and Rac and have been implicated in a wide range of biological activities. PAK4 interacts specifically with the GTP-bound form of Cdc42Hs and weakly activates the JNK family of MAP kinases. PAK4 is a mediator of filopodia formation and may play a role in the reorganization of the actin cytoskeleton. Multiple alternatively spliced transcript variants encoding distinct isoforms have been found for this gene. PAK4 has been shown to be repressed at translational level by miR-24.

PAK4 regulates cellular processes by its scaffolding activity and/or by phosphorylation of effector substrates, which in-turn, set-up a cascades of biochemical events cumulating into a cellular phenotypic response. Examples of PAK4-regulated cellular processes include, dynamic reorganization of actin, and microtubule fibers, anchorage-independent growth, filopodium formation, and cell motility.

- ITGB5, cell survival embryonic development, supports stem cell-like phenotypes, and gene expression. Modulation of PAK4 signaling has been shown to lead to significant functional implications in a number of disease conditions, exemplified by oncogenesis, cancer cell invasion and metastasis.

== Interactions ==
PAK4 has been shown to interact with:

- CDC42,
- ITGB5, and
- LIMK1.
