= Mir-671 microRNA precursor family =

mir-671

Identifiers
- Symbol: mir-671
- Rfam: RF00891
- miRBase family: MIPF0000358

Other data
- RNA type: microRNA
- Domain(s): Eukaryota;
- PDB structures: PDBe

In molecular biology mir-671 microRNA is a short RNA molecule. MicroRNAs function to regulate the expression levels of other genes by several mechanisms.

== Alcoholic and Non-Alcoholic Fatty Liver Disease ==
miR-671 expression levels have been found to be vary significantly between the alcoholic and non-alcoholic forms of fatty liver disease.

== CDR1 regulation ==
miR-671 has been seen to negatively regulate the CDR1 (Cerebellar Degeneration-Related protein 1) gene, through the targeting and cleavage of a circular antisense transcript of the CDR1 locus. There is a partnered decrease in CDR1 mRNA levels with this downregulation.

== FN1 repression ==
miR-671 is able to bind to and repress fibronection type 1 (FN1) mRNA at its 3'untranslated region binding site.

== See also ==
- MicroRNA
