= Integrin alpha 9 =

Protein-coding gene in the species Homo sapiens

ITGA9

Identifiers
- Aliases: ITGA9, ALPHA-RLC, ITGA4L, RLC, integrin subunit alpha 9
- External IDs: OMIM: 603963; MGI: 104756; GeneCards: ITGA9

Gene location (Human)
Chr.	Chromosome 3 (human)
Band	3p22.2	Start	37,452,115 bp
Band	3p22.2	End	37,823,507 bp

Gene location (Mouse)
Chr.	Chromosome 9 (mouse)
Band	9 F3|9 70.32 cM	Start	118,435,758 bp
Band	9 F3|9 70.32 cM	End	118,730,071 bp
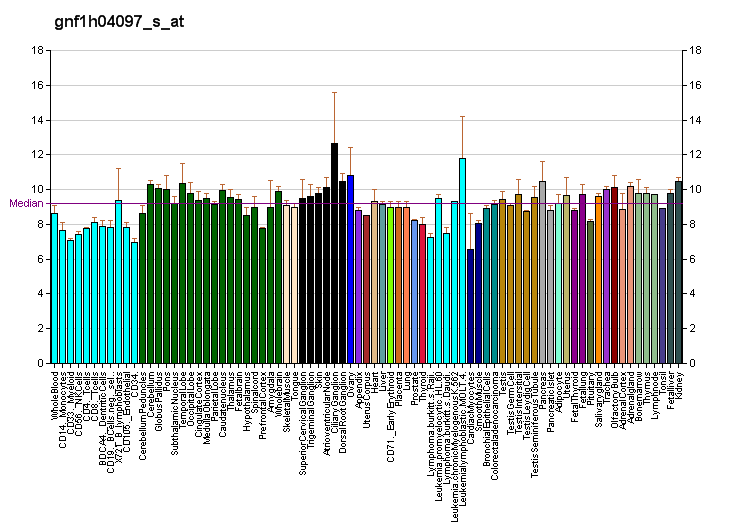
RNA expression pattern
Bgee	Human / Mouse (ortholog); Top expressed in: urethra; saphenous vein; visceral pleura; right ventricle; Descending thoracic aorta; tendon of biceps brachii; vena cava; ascending aorta; thyroid gland; right lobe of thyroid gland / Top expressed in: zygote; ascending aorta; secondary oocyte; primary oocyte; aortic valve; Gonadal ridge; external carotid artery; internal carotid artery; genital tubercle; interventricular septum; More reference expression data
BioGPS	More reference expression data
Gene ontology
Molecular function	metal ion binding; laminin binding; collagen binding
Cellular component	integrin complex; basal plasma membrane; plasma membrane; membrane; integrin alpha9-beta1 complex; integral component of membrane
Biological process	wound healing; integrin-mediated signaling pathway; extracellular matrix organization; neutrophil chemotaxis; cell adhesion
Sources:Amigo / QuickGO
Orthologs
Databases	NCBI: entry; OMA: entry
Species	Human	Mouse
Entrez	3680	104099
Ensembl	ENSG00000144668	ENSMUSG00000039115
UniProt	Q13797	B8JK39
RefSeq (mRNA)	NM_002207	NM_001113514; NM_133721
RefSeq (protein)	NP_002198	NP_001106986; NP_598482
Location (UCSC)	Chr 3: 37.45 – 37.82 Mb	Chr 9: 118.44 – 118.73 Mb
PubMed search
- Wikidata
View/Edit Human	View/Edit Mouse

Integrin alpha-9 is a protein that in humans is encoded by the ITGA9 gene. Cytogenetic location: 3p22.2

== Function ==
This gene encodes an alpha integrin. Integrins are heterodimeric integral membrane glycoproteins composed of an alpha chain and a beta chain that mediate cell-cell and cell-matrix adhesion. The protein encoded by this gene, when bound to the beta 1 chain, forms an integrin that is a receptor for tenascin-C, VCAM1 and osteopontin. Expression of this gene has been found to be upregulated in small cell lung cancers.

== Interactions ==
The α9 subunit forms a heterodimeric complex with a β1 subunit to form the α9β1 integrin. This integrin participates in cell adhesion with various ligands in the extracellular matrix (ECM), including extra domain A (EDA) fibronectin, tenascin-C, ADAMs, EMELIN1, osteopontin, and VEGF. α9β1 binding is independent of the RGD peptide sequence.
