= Integrin-like receptors =

Diagram indicating the complex structure of the plant cell wall; the region in which integrin-like proteins are located

Integrin-like receptors (ILRs) are found in plants and carry unique functional properties similar to true integrin proteins. True homologs of integrins exist in mammals, invertebrates, and some fungi but not in plant cells. Mammalian integrins are heterodimer transmembrane proteins that play a large role in bidirectional signal transduction. As transmembrane proteins, integrins connect the extracellular matrix (ECM) to the plasma membrane of the animal cell. The extracellular matrix of plant cells, fungi, and some protist is referred to as the cell wall. The plant cell wall is composed of a tough cellulose polysaccharide rather than the collagen fibers of the animal ECM. Even with these differences, research indicates that similar proteins involved in the interaction between the ECM and animals cells are also involved in the interaction of the cell wall and plant cells.

Integrin-like receptors and integrin-linked kinases together have been implicated in surface adhesion, immune response, and ion accumulation in plant cells in a manner akin to the family of integrin proteins.

== Structure ==
ILRs contain a transmembrane region with a large extracellular portion and a smaller intracellular section. Most commonly, ILRs resembles the β_{1} subunit found in integrin proteins. This structural similarity between ILRs and integrins was determined through various imaging techniques, SDS-PAGE, western blotting, and kinetic studies. These proteins are around 55 to 110 kDa and some studies have found them to react with animal anti-β_{1} antibodies suggesting the structural similarity between animal integrins and these plant integrin-like receptors.

Some ILRs mimic the α-subunit of integrin proteins containing the ligand binding region known as the I-domain. The I-domain functions primarily in the recognition and binding of a ligand. Conformational changes in the I-domain leads to ILR activation and is dependent on metal ion interaction at metal-ion-dependent adhesion sites (MIDAS). Activation of these sites occur in the presence of Mg^{2+}, Mn^{2+}, and Ca^{2+}.

The extracellular domain of most ILRs contain the highly conserved tripepetid sequence Arg-Gly-Asp (RGD). This sequence is commonly found in integrins and other molecules that attach to the extracellular matrix for cell adhesion. The discovery of the RGD sequence in many proteins suggest the same adhesive ability. While the RGD sequence is the most common, some ILRs have been found with sequences that are similar but differ in one amino acid. A plant protein with structural similarity to integrins contains the amino acid sequence Asn-Gly-Asp (NGD).

== Function ==
=== Plants ===
ILRs play a role in protein-protein interaction and are found in the plasma membrane of plant cells in the leaf, root and vasculature of plants. Plants produce a physiological response that is dependent on information obtained from the environment. The majority of this information is received through mechanical signals which include touch, sound, and gravity. Therefore, the interaction between the ECM and the internal cell response is incredibly important for receiving and interpreting information. The specific functionality of ILRs in plants is not well characterized but in addition to mechanical signaling transduction, they are believed to have some role in plant immune response, osmotic stress sensitivity, and ion regulation within the cell.

==== Surface-Adhesion ====
Some β_{1} integrin-like receptors on the root caps of Tabaco plants are found to play a role in the plant's ability to detect gravitational pull and aid in root elongation in a process known as gravitropism.

ILRs are found on the cellular membrane of plant protoplasts. The dispersion of the ILRs on these protoplasts can vary from species to species. The variation in the ILR surface placement has been correlated to species growth behavior. For example, Rubus fruticosus cells have a uniformed distribution of ILRs on their cellular membrane while Arabidopsis thaliana contains ILRs that cluster resulting in cell growth clusters.

==== Immunology ====
Integrin-like receptors have the capability to relay messages from inside the cell to the outside of the cell and vice versa. This is an important factor in the initiation and sustaining of an immunological response. A good body of research has found ILR proteins that model the glycoproteins vitronectin and fibronectin, two important molecules in membrane stability and homeostasis. These virtonectin-like and fibronectin-like protein provide further support that compounds in the cell membrane of plant cells have important regulatory functions in the immune response such as the activation of immune cells.

The non-race specific disease resistance-1 (NDR1) primarily discovered to have a large function in plant immune response. This protein shares functional homology with mammalian integrins in that it connects the ECM to the intracellular matrix to both stabilize the cell structure and allow for signal exchange. NDR1 is also believed to be involved in cell wall adhesion to the plasma membrane and fluid retention of the cell.

=== Fungi ===
In addition to adhesive properties, integrin-like receptors with RGD-binding sites have special functions in fungi. Using peptides that inhibit the activity of proteins with RGD activation, ILR were discovered in Magnaporthe oryzae to initiate fungal conidial adhesion and appressorium formation needed for host infection. Candida albicans is an opportunistic fungi with an integrin-like receptor protein known as αInt1p. This protein maintains structural similarity and sequence homology to the α-subunits of human leukocyte integrins. The αInt1p protein contains an RGD extracellular binding site and allows the organism to attach to epithelial cells in the host organism to begin the infection process. Once bound, the protein then assists in the morphogenesis of the fungi into a tube-like structure.

=== Invertebrates ===
In invertebrates, protein structures with the RGD-binding sequence assist in an array of different functions such as the repairing of wounds and cell adhesion. Integrin-like receptors are found in mollusk and have a part in the spreading of hemocytes to damaged locations in the cellular system. Studies that block the RGD-binding site of these integrin-like receptors indicate a reduction in hemocyte aggregation and spreading suggesting the RGD-binding site on integrin-like receptors is a necessary component in organismal immune response. Further support for this calm shows RGD-binding inhibition reduces nodule formation and encapsulation in invertebrate immune response.
