= Integrin =

Transmembrane receptors involved in cellular adhesion and signalling

Integrin alphaVbeta3 extracellular domains
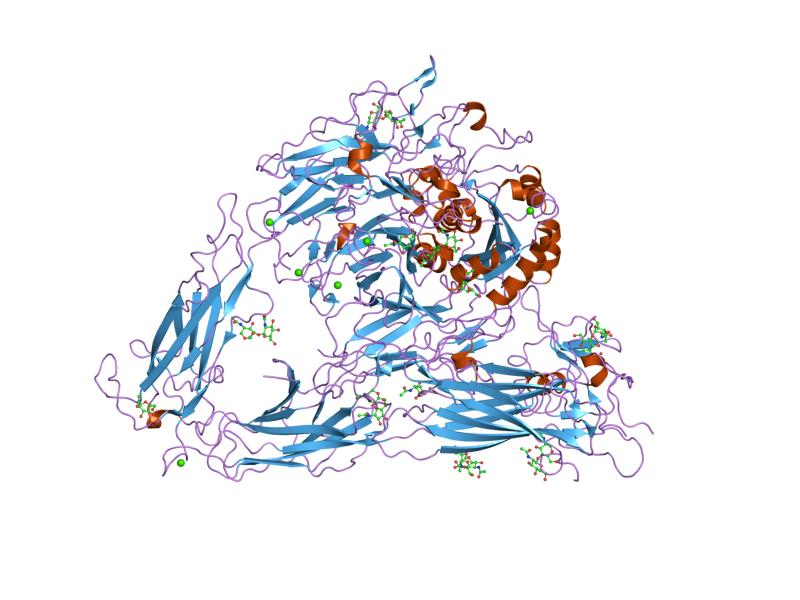
- Structure of the extracellular segment of integrin alpha Vbeta3.

Identifiers
- Symbol: Integrin_alphaVbeta3
- Pfam: PF08441
- Pfam clan: CL0159
- InterPro: IPR013649
- SCOP2: 1jv2 / SCOPe / SUPFAM
- OPM superfamily: 176
- OPM protein: 2knc
- Membranome: 13
Available protein structures:
- PDB: IPR013649 PF08441 (ECOD; PDBsum)
- AlphaFold: IPR013649; PF08441

Integrin alpha cytoplasmic region
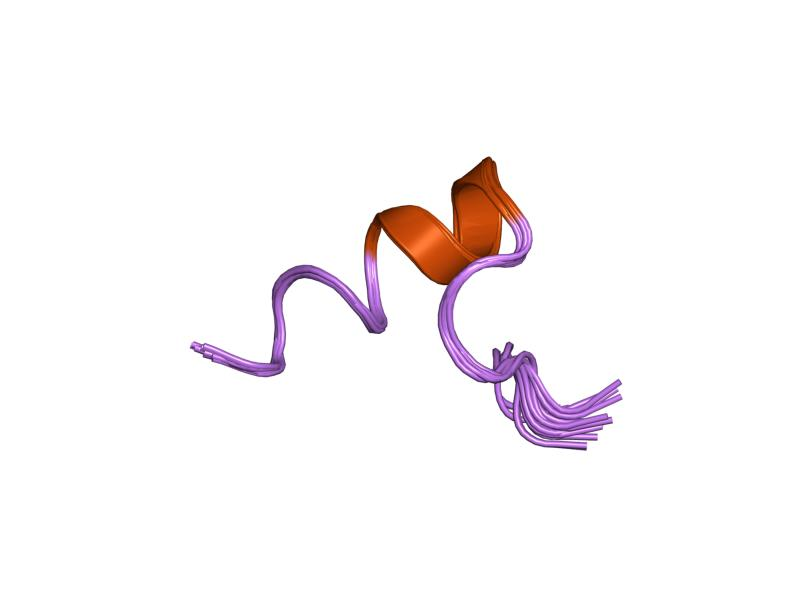
- Structure of chaperone protein PAPD.

Identifiers
- Symbol: Integrin_alpha
- Pfam: PF00357
- InterPro: IPR000413
- PROSITE: PDOC00215
- SCOP2: 1dpk / SCOPe / SUPFAM
Available protein structures:
- PDB: IPR000413 PF00357 (ECOD; PDBsum)
- AlphaFold: IPR000413; PF00357

Integrin, beta chain (vWA)
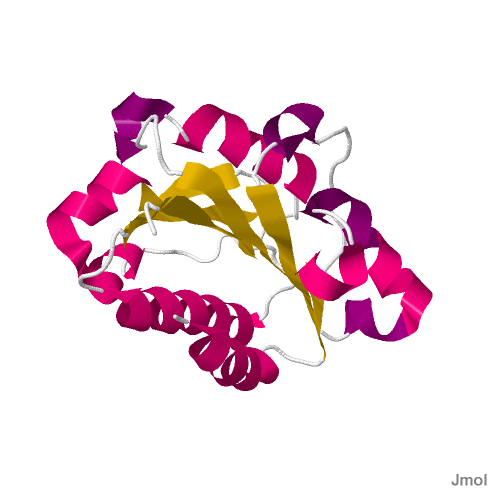

Identifiers
- Symbol: Integrin_beta
- Pfam: PF00362
- InterPro: IPR002369
- SMART: SM00187
- PROSITE: PDOC00216
- SCOP2: 1jv2 / SCOPe / SUPFAM
Available protein structures:
- PDB: 1jv2, 1kup, 1kuz, 1l3y, 1l5g, 1m1x, 1m8o, 1s4x, 1txv, 1ty3, 1ty5, 1ty6, 1ty7, 1tye, 1u8c IPR002369 PF00362 (ECOD; PDBsum)
- AlphaFold: IPR002369; PF00362

Integrin beta 7 cytoplasmic domain: complex with filamin
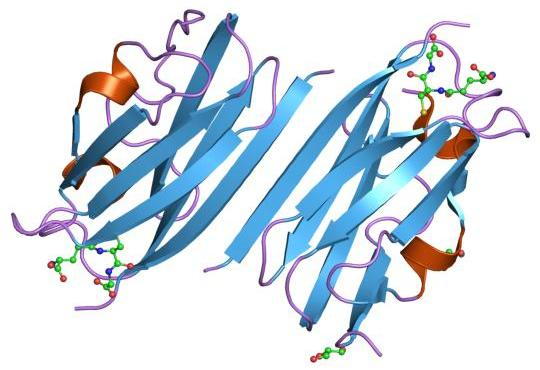
- crystal structure of the filamin a repeat 21 complexed with the integrin beta7 cytoplasmic tail peptide

Identifiers
- Symbol: Integrin_b_cyt
- Pfam: PF08725
- InterPro: IPR014836
- SCOP2: 1m8O / SCOPe / SUPFAM
Available protein structures:
- PDB: IPR014836 PF08725 (ECOD; PDBsum)
- AlphaFold: IPR014836; PF08725

Integrins are transmembrane receptors that help cell–cell and cell–extracellular matrix (ECM) adhesion. Upon ligand binding, integrins activate signal transduction pathways that mediate cellular signals such as regulation of the cell cycle, organization of the intracellular cytoskeleton, and movement of new receptors to the cell membrane. The presence of integrins allows rapid and flexible responses to events at the cell surface (e.g. signal platelets to initiate an interaction with coagulation factors).

Several types of integrins exist, and one cell generally has multiple different types on its surface. Integrins are found in all animal cells while integrin-like receptors are found in plant cells.

Integrins work alongside other proteins such as cadherins, the immunoglobulin superfamily cell adhesion molecules, selectins and syndecans, to mediate cell–cell and cell–matrix interaction. Ligands for integrins include fibronectin, vitronectin, collagen and laminin.

== Structure ==
Integrins are obligate heterodimers composed of α and β subunits. Several genes code for multiple isoforms of these subunits, which gives rise to an array of unique integrins with varied activity. In mammals, integrins are assembled from eighteen α and eight β subunits, in Drosophila five α and two β subunits, and in Caenorhabditis nematodes two α subunits and one β subunit. The α and β subunits are both class I transmembrane proteins, so each penetrates the plasma membrane once, and can possess several cytoplasmic domains.

alpha (mammal)
gene	protein	synonyms
ITGA1	CD49a	α_{1}, VLA1
ITGA2	CD49b	α_{2}, VLA2
ITGA3	CD49c	α_{3}, VLA3
ITGA4	CD49d	α_{4}, VLA4
ITGA5	CD49e	α_{5}, VLA5
ITGA6	CD49f	α_{6}, VLA6
ITGA7	ITGA7	α_{7}, FLJ25220
ITGA8	ITGA8	α_{8}
ITGA9	ITGA9	α_{9}, RLC
ITGA10	ITGA10	α_{10}, PRO827
ITGA11	ITGA11	α_{11}, HsT18964
ITGAD	CD11d	α_{D}, FLJ39841
ITGAE	CD103	α_{E}, HUMINAE
ITGAL	CD11a	α_{L}, LFA1A
ITGAM	CD11b	α_{M}, MAC-1
ITGAV	CD51	α_{V}, VNRA, MSK8
ITGA2B	CD41	α_{IIb}, GPIIb
ITGAX	CD11c	α_{X}

beta (mammal)
gene	protein	synonyms
ITGB1	CD29	β_{1}, FNRB, MSK12, MDF2
ITGB2	CD18	β_{2}, LFA-1, MAC-1, MFI7
ITGB3	CD61	β_{3}, GP3A, GPIIIa
ITGB4	CD104	β_{4}
ITGB5	ITGB5	β_{5}, FLJ26658
ITGB6	ITGB6	β_{6}
ITGB7	ITGB7	β_{7}
ITGB8	ITGB8	β_{8}

Variants of some subunits are formed by differential RNA splicing; for example, four variants of the beta-1 subunit exist. Through different combinations of the α and β subunits, 24 unique mammalian integrins are generated, excluding splice- and glycosylation variants.

Integrin subunits span the cell membrane and have short cytoplasmic domains of 40–70 amino acids. The exception is the beta-4 subunit, which has a cytoplasmic domain of 1,088 amino acids, one of the largest of any membrane protein. Outside the cell membrane, the α and β chains lie close together along a length of about 23 nm; the final 5 nm N-termini of each chain forms a ligand-binding region for the ECM. They have been compared to lobster claws, although they don't actually "pinch" their ligand, they chemically interact with it at the insides of the "tips" of their "pinchers".

The molecular mass of the integrin subunits can vary from 90 kDa to 160 kDa. Beta subunits have four cysteine-rich repeated sequences. Both α and β subunits bind several divalent cations. The role of divalent cations in the α subunit is unknown, but may stabilize the folds of the protein. The cations in the β subunits are more interesting: they are directly involved in coordinating at least some of the ligands that integrins bind.

Integrins can be categorized in multiple ways. For example, some α chains have an additional structural element (or "domain") inserted toward the N-terminal, the alpha-A domain (so called because it has a similar structure to the A-domains found in the protein von Willebrand factor; it is also termed the α-I domain). Integrins carrying this domain either bind to collagens (e.g. integrins α1 β1, and α2 β1), or act as cell-cell adhesion molecules (integrins of the β2 family). This α-I domain is the binding site for ligands of such integrins. Those integrins that don't carry this inserted domain also have an A-domain in their ligand binding site, but this A-domain is found on the β subunit.

In both cases, the A-domains carry up to three divalent cation binding sites. One is permanently occupied in physiological concentrations of divalent cations, and carries either a calcium or magnesium ion, the principal divalent cations in blood at median concentrations of 1.4 mM (calcium) and 0.8 mM (magnesium). The other two sites become occupied by cations when ligands bind—at least for those ligands involving an acidic amino acid in their interaction sites. An acidic amino acid features in the integrin-interaction site of many ECM proteins, for example as part of the amino acid sequence Arginine-Glycine-Aspartic acid ("RGD" in the one-letter amino acid code).

=== Structure ===
Despite many years of effort, discovering the high-resolution structure of integrins proved to be challenging, as membrane proteins are classically difficult to purify, and as integrins are large, complex and highly glycosylated with many sugar 'trees' attached to them. Low-resolution images of detergent extracts of intact integrin GPIIbIIIa, obtained using electron microscopy, and even data from indirect techniques that investigate the solution properties of integrins using ultracentrifugation and light scattering, were combined with fragmentary high-resolution crystallographic or NMR data from single or paired domains of single integrin chains, and molecular models postulated for the rest of the chains.

The X-ray crystal structure obtained in 2001 for the complete extracellular region of one integrin, αvβ3, shows the molecule to be folded into an inverted V-shape that potentially brings the ligand-binding sites close to the cell membrane. Perhaps more importantly, the crystal structure was also obtained in 2003 for the same integrin bound to a small ligand containing the RGD-sequence, the drug cilengitide. As detailed above, this finally revealed why divalent cations (in the A-domains) are critical for RGD-ligand binding to integrins. The interaction of such sequences with integrins is believed to be a primary switch by which ECM exerts its effects on cell behaviour.

The structure poses many questions, especially regarding ligand binding and signal transduction. The ligand binding site is directed towards the C-terminal of the integrin, the region where the molecule emerges from the cell membrane. If it emerges orthogonally from the membrane, the ligand binding site would apparently be obstructed, especially as integrin ligands are typically massive and well cross-linked components of the ECM. In fact, little is known about the angle that membrane proteins subtend to the plane of the membrane; this is a problem difficult to address with available technologies. The default assumption is that they emerge rather like little lollipops, but there is little evidence for this. The integrin structure has drawn attention to this problem, which may have general implications for how membrane proteins work. It appears that the integrin transmembrane helices are tilted (see "Activation" below), which hints that the extracellular chains may also not be orthogonal with respect to the membrane surface.

Although the crystal structure changed surprisingly little after binding to cilengitide, the current hypothesis is that integrin function involves changes in shape to move the ligand-binding site into a more accessible position, away from the cell surface, and this shape change also triggers intracellular signaling. There is a wide body of cell-biological and biochemical literature that supports this view. Perhaps the most convincing evidence involves the use of antibodies that only recognize integrins when they have bound to their ligands, or are activated. As the "footprint" that an antibody makes on its binding target is roughly a circle about 3 nm in diameter, the resolution of this technique is low. Nevertheless, these so-called LIBS (Ligand-Induced-Binding-Sites) antibodies unequivocally show that dramatic changes in integrin shape routinely occur. However, how the changes detected with antibodies look on the structure is still unknown.

In 2018, X-ray crystal work revealed the complete structure of an extended β3 "headpiece" via the construction of a chimeric protein: the I domain of β3 was replaced with the I domain of αL. This work confirmed the swing-out motion of the hybrid domain (resulting in headpiece opening) and the switchblade-like extending motion of the headpiece from the "leg" domains previously observed and added more resolution and detail on how the two motions interact.

High-resolution structures (< 3.15 Å) for extracellular parts of whole integrin complexes were finally obtained in 2025 thanks to advancements in cryo-TEM and a micellar construction. 11 structures were obtained for αvβ3, including six apo and five ligand-bound. (The transmembrane part is visible in the low-resolution map but failed to refine to high resolution, indicating considerable flexibility.) An intermediate state was found with CWHM-12 as the ligand called "conformation 2". The classical inactive (1) and open (3) states were also observed in detail, with a notable resemblance to two states previously observed in low resolution using the LM609 antibody (known to not bind to the LIGS).

=== Activation ===
When released into the cell membrane, newly synthesized integrin dimers are speculated to be found in the same "bent" conformation revealed by the structural studies described above. One school of thought claims that this bent form prevents them from interacting with their ligands, although bent forms can predominate in high-resolution EM structures of integrin bound to an ECM ligand. Therefore, at least in biochemical experiments, integrin dimers must apparently not be 'unbent' in order to prime them and allow their binding to the ECM. In cells, the priming is accomplished by a protein talin, which binds to the β tail of the integrin dimer and changes its conformation. The α and β integrin chains are both class-I transmembrane proteins: they pass the plasma membrane as single transmembrane alpha-helices. Unfortunately, the helices are too long, and recent studies suggest that, for integrin gpIIbIIIa, they are tilted with respect both to one another and to the plane of the membrane. Talin binding alters the angle of tilt of the β3 chain transmembrane helix in model systems and this may reflect a stage in the process of inside-out signalling which primes integrins. Moreover, talin proteins are able to dimerize and thus are thought to intervene in the clustering of integrin dimers which leads to the formation of a focal adhesion. Recently, the Kindlin-1 and Kindlin-2 proteins have also been found to interact with integrin and activate it.

== Function ==
Integrins have two main functions: attachment of the cells to the ECM and signal transduction from the ECM to the cells. They are also involved in a wide range of other biological activities, including extravasation, cell-to-cell adhesion, cell migration, and as receptors for certain viruses, such as adenovirus, echovirus, hantavirus, foot-and-mouth disease, polio virus and other viruses. Recently, the importance of integrins in the progress of autoimmune disorders is also gaining attention of the scientists. These mechanoreceptors seem to regulate autoimmunity by dictating various intracellular pathways to control immune cell adhesion to endothelial cell layers followed by their trans-migration. This process might or might not be dependent on the sheer force faced by the extracellular parts of different integrins.

A prominent function of the integrins is seen in the molecule GpIIb/IIIa, an integrin on the surface of blood platelets (thrombocytes) responsible for attachment to fibrin within a developing blood clot. This molecule dramatically increases its binding affinity for fibrin/fibrinogen through association of platelets with exposed collagens in the wound site. Upon association of platelets with collagen, GPIIb/IIIa changes shape, allowing it to bind to fibrin and other blood components to form the clot matrix and stop blood loss.

=== Attachment of cell to the ECM ===
Integrins couple the cell-extracellular matrix (ECM) outside a cell to the cytoskeleton (in particular, the microfilaments) inside the cell. Which ligand in the ECM the integrin can bind to is defined by which α and β subunits the integrin is made of. Among the ligands of integrins are fibronectin, vitronectin, collagen, and laminin. The connection between the cell and the ECM may help the cell to endure pulling forces without being ripped out of the ECM. The ability of a cell to create this kind of bond is also of vital importance in ontogeny.

Cell attachment to the ECM is a basic requirement to build a multicellular organism. Integrins are not simply hooks, but give the cell critical signals about the nature of its surroundings. Together with signals arising from receptors for soluble growth factors like VEGF, EGF, and many others, they enforce a cellular decision on what biological action to take, be it attachment, movement, death, or differentiation. Thus integrins lie at the heart of many cellular biological processes. The attachment of the cell takes place through formation of cell adhesion complexes, which consist of integrins and many cytoplasmic proteins, such as talin, vinculin, paxillin, and alpha-actinin. These act by regulating kinases such as FAK (focal adhesion kinase) and Src kinase family members to phosphorylate substrates such as p130CAS thereby recruiting signaling adaptors such as CRK. These adhesion complexes attach to the actin cytoskeleton. The integrins thus serve to link two networks across the plasma membrane: the extracellular ECM and the intracellular actin filamentous system. Integrin α6β4 is an exception: it links to the keratin intermediate filament system in epithelial cells.

Focal adhesions are large molecular complexes, which are generated following interaction of integrins with ECM, then their clustering. The clusters likely provide sufficient intracellular binding sites to permit the formation of stable signaling complexes on the cytoplasmic side of the cell membrane. So the focal adhesions contain integrin ligand, integrin molecule, and associate plaque proteins. Binding is propelled by changes in free energy. As previously stated, these complexes connect the extracellular matrix to actin bundles. Cryo-electron tomography reveals that the adhesion contains particles on the cell membrane with diameter of 25 ± 5 nm and spaced at approximately 45 nm. Treatment with Rho-kinase inhibitor Y-27632 reduces the size of the particle, and it is extremely mechanosensitive.

One important function of integrins on cells in tissue culture is their role in cell migration. Cells adhere to a substrate through their integrins. During movement, the cell makes new attachments to the substrate at its front and concurrently releases those at its rear. When released from the substrate, integrin molecules are taken back into the cell by endocytosis; they are transported through the cell to its front by the endocytic cycle, where they are added back to the surface. In this way they are cycled for reuse, enabling the cell to make fresh attachments at its leading front. The cycle of integrin endocytosis and recycling back to the cell surface is important for migrating cells and also during animal development.

=== Signal transduction ===
Integrins play an important role in cell signaling by modulating the cell signaling pathways of transmembrane protein kinases such as receptor tyrosine kinases (RTK). While the interaction between integrin and receptor tyrosine kinases originally was thought of as uni-directional and supportive, recent studies indicate that integrins have additional, multi-faceted roles in cell signaling. Integrins can regulate the receptor tyrosine kinase signaling by recruiting specific adaptors to the plasma membrane. For example, β1c integrin recruits Gab1/Shp2 and presents Shp2 to IGF1R, resulting in dephosphorylation of the receptor. In a reverse direction, when a receptor tyrosine kinase is activated, integrins co-localise at focal adhesion with the receptor tyrosine kinases and their associated signaling molecules.

The repertoire of integrins expressed on a particular cell can specify the signaling pathway due to the differential binding affinity of ECM ligands for the integrins. The tissue stiffness and matrix composition can initiate specific signaling pathways regulating cell behavior. Clustering and activation of the integrins/actin complexes strengthen the focal adhesion interaction and initiate the framework for cell signaling through assembly of adhesomes.

Depending on the integrin's regulatory impact on specific receptor tyrosine kinases, the cell can experience:

- cell growth
- cell division
- cell survival
- cellular differentiation
- apoptosis (programmed cell death)

Knowledge of the relationship between integrins and receptor tyrosine kinase has laid a foundation for new approaches to cancer therapy. Specifically, targeting integrins associated with RTKs is an emerging approach for inhibiting angiogenesis.

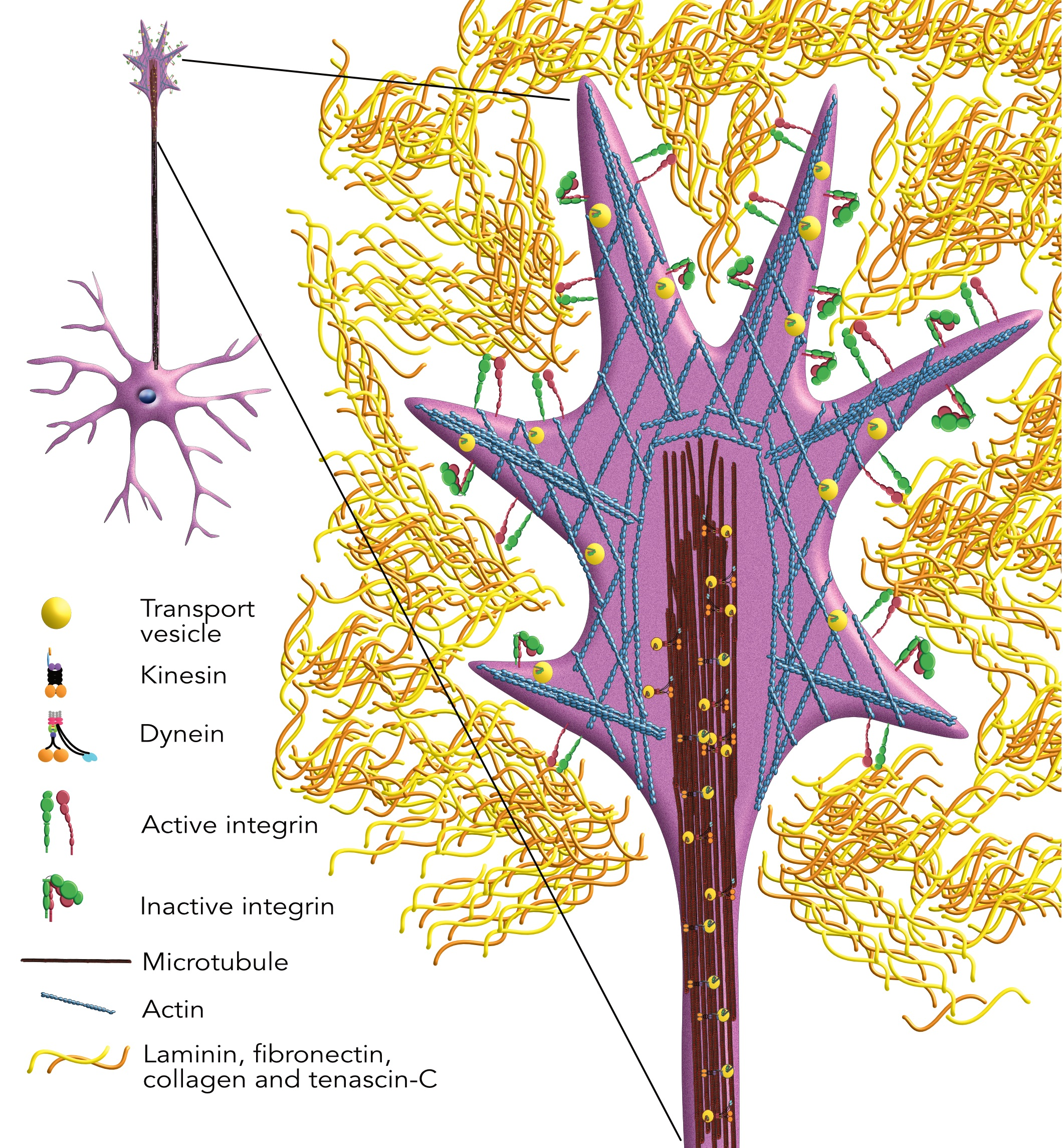
Integrins are localised at the growth cone of regenerating neurons.

== Integrins and nerve repair ==
Integrins have an important function in neuroregeneration after injury of the peripheral nervous system (PNS). Integrins are present at the growth cone of damaged PNS neurons and attach to ligands in the ECM to promote axon regeneration. It is unclear whether integrins can promote axon regeneration in the adult central nervous system (CNS). There are two obstacles that prevent integrin-mediated regeneration in the CNS: 1) integrins are not localised in the axon of most adult CNS neurons and 2) integrins become inactivated by molecules in the scar tissue after injury.

== Vertebrate integrins ==
The following are 16 of the ~24 integrins found in vertebrates:

Name	Synonyms	Distribution	Ligands
α_{1}β_{1}	VLA-1	Many	Collagens, laminins
α_{2}β_{1}	VLA-2	Many	Collagens, laminins
α_{3}β_{1}	VLA-3	Many	Laminin-5
α_{4}β_{1}	VLA-4	Hematopoietic cells	Fibronectin, VCAM-1
α_{4}β_{7}	LPAM-1	T cells	MAD-CAM1
α_{5}β_{1}	VLA-5; fibronectin receptor	widespread	fibronectin and proteinases
α_{6}β_{1}	VLA-6; laminin receptor	widespread	laminins
α_{7}β_{1}		muscle, glioma	laminins
α_{L}β_{2}	LFA-1	T-lymphocytes	ICAM-1, ICAM-2
α_{M}β_{2}	Mac-1, CR3	Neutrophils and monocytes	Serum proteins, ICAM-1
α_{IIb}β_{3}	Fibrinogen receptor; gpIIbIIIa	Platelets	fibrinogen, fibronectin
α_{V}β_{1}		neurological tumors	vitronectin, osteopontin, fibrinogen
α_{V}β_{3}	vitronectin receptor	activated endothelial cells, melanoma, glioblastoma	vitronectin, fibronectin, fibrinogen, osteopontin, Cyr61, thyroxine, TETRAC
α_{V}β_{5}		widespread, esp. fibroblasts, epithelial cells	vitronectin, osteopontin, and adenovirus
α_{V}β_{6}		proliferating epithelia, esp. lung and mammary gland	fibronectin; TGFβ1+3
α_{V}β_{8}		neural tissue; peripheral nerve	fibronectin; TGFβ1+3
α_{6}β_{4}		Epithelial cells	Laminin

Beta-1 integrins interact with many alpha integrin chains. Gene knockouts of integrins in mice are not always lethal, which suggests that during embryonal development, one integrin may substitute its function for another in order to allow survival. Some integrins are on the cell surface in an inactive state, and can be rapidly primed, or put into a state capable of binding their ligands, by cytokines. Integrins can assume several different well-defined shapes or "conformational states". Once primed, the conformational state changes to stimulate ligand binding, which then activates the receptors — also by inducing a shape change — to trigger outside-in signal transduction.

== See also ==
- D-dimer
- Disintegrin
- Exopolymer
- Extracellular polymeric substance (EPS or XPS)
