= BSPH1 =

Protein-coding gene in humans

Identifiers
- Aliases: BSPH1, BSP1, ELSPBP2, binder of sperm protein homolog 1
- External IDs: OMIM: 612213; MGI: 2685613; HomoloGene: 86818; GeneCards: BSPH1; OMA:BSPH1 - orthologs

Gene location (Human)
Chr.	Chromosome 19 (human)
Band	19q13.33	Start	47,968,046 bp
Band	19q13.33	End	47,992,170 bp

Gene location (Mouse)
Chr.	Chromosome 7 (mouse)
Band	7|7 A1	Start	13,184,766 bp
Band	7|7 A1	End	13,207,374 bp
RNA expression pattern
Bgee	Human / Mouse (ortholog); Top expressed in: gonad; right hemisphere of cerebellum; superior frontal gyrus; primary visual cortex; cell; prefrontal cortex; monocyte; C1 segment; substantia nigra; male reproductive system / Top expressed in: striatum of neuraxis; spermatid; neural layer of retina; testicle; More reference expression data
BioGPS	n/a
Gene ontology
Molecular function	heparin binding
Cellular component	extracellular region; cell surface
Biological process	single fertilization; sperm capacitation
Sources:Amigo / QuickGO
Orthologs
Species	Human	Mouse
Entrez	100131137	330470
Ensembl	ENSG00000188334	ENSMUSG00000074378
UniProt	Q075Z2	Q3UW26
RefSeq (mRNA)	NM_001128326	NM_001033418; NM_001301682
RefSeq (protein)	NP_001121798	NP_001028590; NP_001288611
Location (UCSC)	Chr 19: 47.97 – 47.99 Mb	Chr 7: 13.18 – 13.21 Mb
PubMed search
- Wikidata
View/Edit Human	View/Edit Mouse

Binder of sperm protein homolog 1 is a protein that in humans is encoded by the BSPH1 gene. It contains two fibronectin type II domains (Fn2 domains) linked in tandem by disulfide bonds. BSPH1 is a member of the BSP protein superfamily along with bovine PDC-109.

== Function ==
The BSPH1 protein performs various roles in sperm function, primarily through binding of the sperm membrane. This is done through its Fn2 domains, which bind choline phospholipids on the membranes' surfaces. Binding occurs in the epididymis prior to ejaculation, and acts to stabilize the sperm.

After ejaculation and entry of sperm into the oviduct, the protein facilitates capacitation, a key step in egg fertilization. Here, it acts in conjunction with oviductal cholesterol acceptors, such as albumin and HDL, to remove cholesterol from the sperm membrane in a cholesterol efflux. With the loss of cholesterol, glycosylphosphatidylinositol-anchor proteins (GPI-APs) become destabilized, increasing membrane fluidity, resulting in the release of BSPH1.
