= Vitaxin =

Monoclonal antibody
- Type: Whole antibody
- Source: Humanized (from mouse)
- Target: alpha-v beta-3 integrin

Clinical data
- Trade names: Vitaxin
- ATC code: none

Identifiers
- DrugBank: DB05787
- ChemSpider: none

Vitaxin (MEDI-523) is a humanized monoclonal antibody against the vascular integrin alpha-v beta-3. It is shown to be a promising angiogenesis inhibitor used in the treatment of some forms of cancer. Vitaxin was in 2002 being studied for rheumatoid arthritis. It is the developmental precursor of Etaracizumab (MEDI-522). Both are derived from the mouse antibody LM609.

Vitaxin is safe for humans. It has little effect on advanced cancer.
