= Alpha-v beta-3 =

α_{V}β_{3} is a type of integrin that is a receptor for vitronectin. It consists of two components, integrin alpha V and integrin beta 3 (CD61), and is expressed by platelets. Furthermore, it is a receptor for phagocytosis on macrophages or dendritic cells.

== As a drug target ==
Integrin α_{V}β_{3} is a potential drug target because abnormal expression of v3 is linked to the development and progression of various diseases. Its role in angiogenesis, in cancer and other diseases, is linked to the blood supply for problematic overgrowths.

Inhibitors like etaracizumab may be used as antiangiogenics.

One novel protein (ProAgio) has been designed to bind at an unusual site, and then induces apoptosis by recruiting caspase 8. It is designed by mutating domain 1 of CD2 (D1-CD2), which naturally binds weakly to the receptor.

Fibronectin domain 10 contains the RGD motif that α_{V}β_{3} recognizes. A high-affinity, pure antagonist mutant has been discovered for this protein.

== See also ==
- Proteases in angiogenesis
- Vitaxin, a respective antibody
