= Fibronectin type I domain =

Fibronectin, type I

Identifiers
- Symbol: Fibrnctn1
- Pfam: PF00039
- InterPro: IPR000083
- SMART: SM00058
- PROSITE: PDOC00965
- CDD: cd00061
Available protein structures:
- Pfam: structures / ECOD
- PDB: RCSB PDB; PDBe; PDBj
- PDBsum: structure summary
- PDB: PDB: 1e88 PDB: 1e8b PDB: 1fbr PDB: 1o9a PDB: 1qgb PDB: 1qo6 PDB: 1tpg PDB: 1tpm PDB: 1tpn PDB: 2fn2

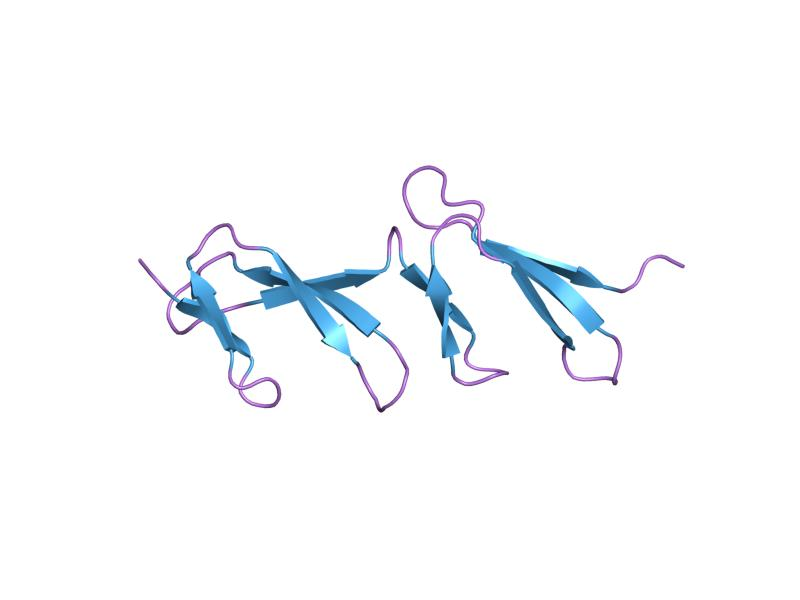

Fibronectin, type I repeats are one of the three repeats found in the fibronectin protein. Fibronectin is a plasma protein that binds cell surfaces and various compounds including collagen, fibrin, heparin, DNA, and actin. Type I domain (FN1) is approximately 40 residues in length. Four conserved cysteines are involved in disulfide bonds. The 3D structure of the FN1 domain has been determined. It consists of two antiparallel beta-sheets, first a double-stranded one, that is linked by a disulfide bond to a triple-stranded beta-sheet. The second conserved disulfide bridge links the C-terminal adjacent strands of the domain.

In human tissue plasminogen activator chain A the FN1 domain together with the following epidermal growth factor (EGF)-like domain are involved in fibrin-binding. It has been suggested that these two modules form a single structural and functional unit. The two domains keep their specific tertiary structure, but interact intimately to bury a hydrophobic core; the inter-module linker makes up the third strand of the EGF-module's major beta-sheet.

== Human proteins containing this domain ==
F12; FN1; HGFAC; PLAT;
