= Integrin alpha 11 =

Protein-coding gene in the species Homo sapiens

ITGA11

Identifiers
- Aliases: ITGA11, HsT18964, integrin subunit alpha 11
- External IDs: OMIM: 604042, 604789; MGI: 2442114; GeneCards: ITGA11

Gene location (Human)
Chr.	Chromosome 15 (human)
Band	15q23	Start	68,296,532 bp
Band	15q23	End	68,432,163 bp

Gene location (Mouse)
Chr.	Chromosome 9 (mouse)
Band	9|9 B	Start	62,585,108 bp
Band	9|9 B	End	62,691,264 bp
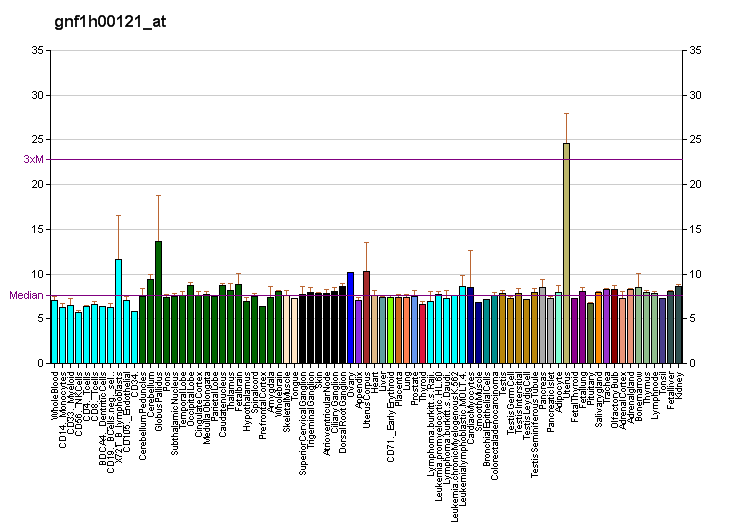
RNA expression pattern
Bgee	Human / Mouse (ortholog); Top expressed in: Descending thoracic aorta; ascending aorta; Achilles tendon; stromal cell of endometrium; body of uterus; right coronary artery; smooth muscle tissue; myometrium; left coronary artery; popliteal artery / Top expressed in: upper arm; appendicular skeleton; mesenchyme; rib; bones of pectoral girdle; second toe; humerus; clavicle; mandible; quadriceps femoris muscle; More reference expression data
BioGPS	More reference expression data
Gene ontology
Molecular function	collagen receptor activity; collagen binding involved in cell-matrix adhesion; collagen binding; metal ion binding
Cellular component	integral component of membrane; integrin complex; plasma membrane; integrin alpha11-beta1 complex; membrane; focal adhesion
Biological process	integrin-mediated signaling pathway; muscle organ development; cell adhesion; cell-matrix adhesion; extracellular matrix organization; cell adhesion mediated by integrin; osteoblast differentiation; substrate-dependent cell migration; collagen-activated signaling pathway
Sources:Amigo / QuickGO
Orthologs
Databases	NCBI: entry; OMA: entry
Species	Human	Mouse
Entrez	22801	319480
Ensembl	ENSG00000137809	ENSMUSG00000032243
UniProt	Q9UKX5	P61622
RefSeq (mRNA)	NM_001004439; NM_012211	NM_176922
RefSeq (protein)	NP_001004439	n/a
Location (UCSC)	Chr 15: 68.3 – 68.43 Mb	Chr 9: 62.59 – 62.69 Mb
PubMed search
- Wikidata
View/Edit Human	View/Edit Mouse

Integrin alpha-11 is a protein that, in humans, is encoded by the ITGA11 gene.

This gene encodes an alpha integrin. Integrins are heterodimeric integral membrane proteins composed of an alpha chain and a beta chain. This protein contains an I domain, is expressed in muscle tissue, dimerizes with beta 1 integrin in vitro, and appears to bind collagen in this form. Therefore, the protein may be involved in attaching muscle tissue to the extracellular matrix. Alternative transcriptional splice variants have been found for this gene, but their biological validity is not determined.

According to one study, ITGA11 expression is increased in the anterior stroma of corneal buttons excised from the eyes affected by keratoconus. Another study showed that ITGA11 is overexpressed in myofibroblasts in different human fibrotic diseases, including liver cirrhosis, renal fibrosis, and lung fibrosis tissues. ITGA11 has also been found to be upregulated in the tumor stroma of pancreatic ductal adenocarcinoma. Knocking down of ITGA11 in human pancreatic stellate cells led to the inhibition of their differentiation into myofibroblasts and paracrine effect on tumor cells.
