= Etaracizumab =

Monoclonal antibody

Monoclonal antibody
- Type: Whole antibody
- Source: Humanized (from mouse)
- Target: alpha-v beta-3 integrin

Clinical data
- Trade names: Abegrin
- ATC code: none

Identifiers
- CAS Number: 892553-42-3
- ChemSpider: none
- UNII: 41W9MFI160
- KEGG: D09342

Chemical and physical data
- Formula: C_{6392}H_{9908}N_{1732}O_{1996}S_{42}
- Molar mass: 144302.22 g·mol^{−1}

Etaracizumab, also known as MEDI-522, trade name Abegrin, is a humanized monoclonal antibody which is being investigated for the treatment of metastatic melanoma, prostate cancer, ovarian cancer and various other types of cancer. It is manufactured by MedImmune.

It is an enhanced iteration of Vitaxin, also known as MEDI-523. Both are derived from the mouse antibody LM609.
