= PF-3758309 =

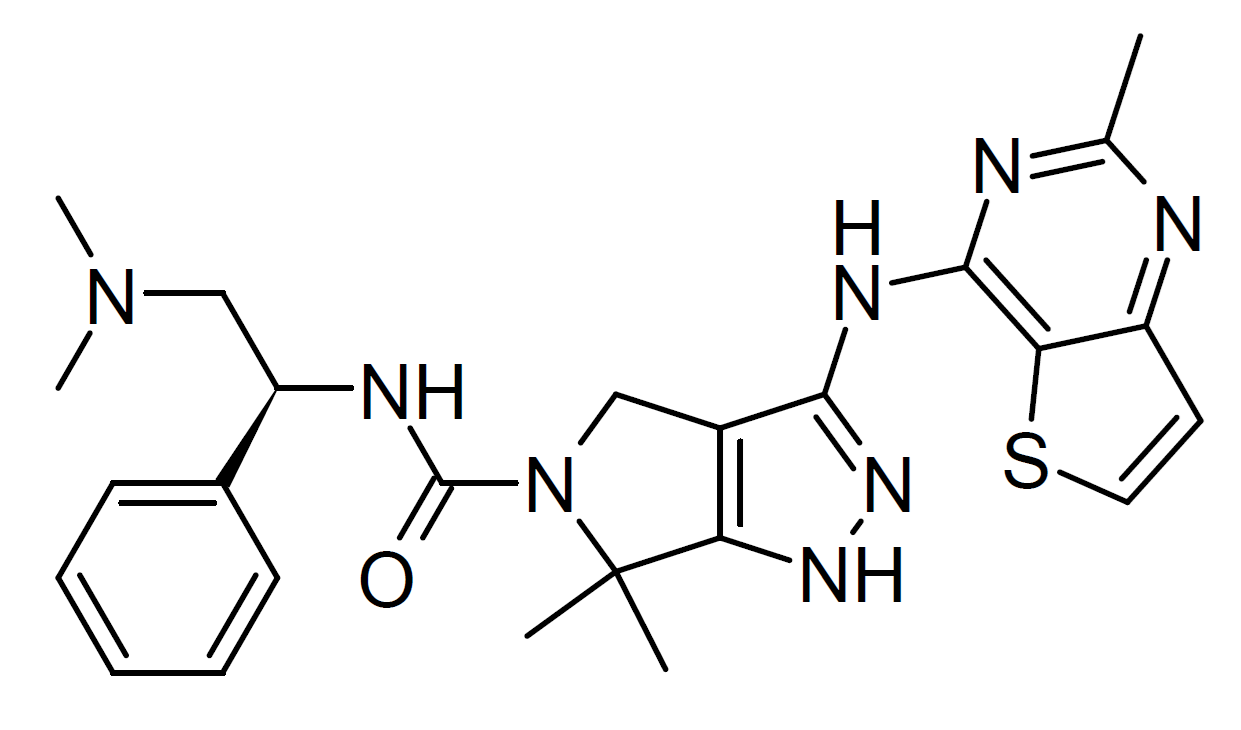

Identifiers
- IUPAC name: N-[(1S)-2-(dimethylamino)-1-phenylethyl]-6,6-dimethyl-3-[(2-methylthieno[3,2-d]pyrimidin-4-yl)amino]-1,4-dihydropyrrolo[3,4-c]pyrazole-5-carboxamide
- CAS Number: 898044-15-0
- PubChem CID: 25227462
- IUPHAR/BPS: 8937
- DrugBank: DB11775
- ChemSpider: 25069694
- UNII: PK459EA5I2
- ChEBI: CHEBI:93751
- ChEMBL: ChEMBL3128043
- CompTox Dashboard (EPA): DTXSID70649389
- ECHA InfoCard: 100.231.337

Chemical and physical data
- Formula: C_{25}H_{30}N_{8}OS
- Molar mass: 490.63 g·mol^{−1}
- 3D model (JSmol): Interactive image
- SMILES: CC1=NC2=C(C(=N1)NC3=NNC4=C3CN(C4(C)C)C(=O)N[C@H](CN(C)C)C5=CC=CC=C5)SC=C2
- InChI: InChI=1S/C25H30N8OS/c1-15-26-18-11-12-35-20(18)23(27-15)29-22-17-13-33(25(2,3)21(17)30-31-22)24(34)28-19(14-32(4)5)16-9-7-6-8-10-16/h6-12,19H,13-14H2,1-5H3,(H,28,34)(H2,26,27,29,30,31)/t19-/m1/s1; Key:AYCPARAPKDAOEN-LJQANCHMSA-N

PF-3758309 is an experimental anticancer drug which acts as an inhibitor of p21-activated kinases with highest affinity for PAK4. It shows activity against a variety of different cancer types including colon, lung and pancreatic cancers, and is in early stage clinical trials.
