= PUR4 =

pUR4 is a recombinant peptide that is known to inhibit the polymerization of fibronectin in a number of cell types including fibroblasts and endothelial cells. Fibronectin is an essential component of the extracellular matrix that acts as a mediator between the extracellular matrix and the cells that reside within the matrix. This cell-matrix communication occurs by binding interactions between fibronectin and matrix assembly sites on the cell surface. pUR4 interferes with these binding interaction by binding to fibronectin itself.

Fibronectin is known to regulate the deposition of other extracellular matrix proteins as well as influence the formation of vascular networks. For this reason, pUR4 is utilized in a number of research studies to determine the precise impact fibronectin has on these processes. The formation of vascular networks is a particularly interesting topic as it is of special interest to those who study tumor and cancer growth. Tumors are limited in size by the rate of diffusion of nutrients and waste. The ability to form vascular networks allows a tumor to grow beyond this limit and leads to the possibility of metastasis. By searching for a way to inhibit tumor vascular network formation, tumor size can be restricted and the possibility of metastasis reduced.

pUR4 is derived from the F1 adhesin of Streptococcus pyogenes, which binds to the N-terminal 70-kDa region of fibronectin with high affinity It does not bind to any other extracellular matrix proteins nor does it inhibit cell spreading or adhesion to the extracellular matrix. pUR4 also does not inhibit mRNA synthesis of any of the extracellular matrix proteins.

Current research shows that pUR4 inhibits the deposition of fibronectin. By preventing polymerization of fibronectin, the deposition of collagen type I, another extracellular matrix protein, is also reduced. This ultimately leads to a decrease in the accumulation of extracellular matrix, decreases cell proliferation, and blocks vascular remodeling.
