= Intetumumab =

Monoclonal antibody

Monoclonal antibody
- Type: Whole antibody
- Source: Human
- Target: integrin alpha-V

Clinical data
- ATC code: none

Identifiers
- CAS Number: 725735-28-4
- ChemSpider: none
- UNII: GQE1BJE2NI
- KEGG: D09631

Chemical and physical data
- Formula: C_{6468}H_{10008}N_{1744}O_{2006}S_{40}
- Molar mass: 145579.81 g·mol^{−1}

Intetumumab is a human monoclonal antibody targeting integrins that was being studied for the treatment of solid tumors.

Intetumumab was developed by Centocor, Inc.

Phase II clinical trials for treatment of melanoma and prostate cancer were in progress when development of the drug was discontinued.
