= Integrin alpha D =

Protein-coding gene in the species Homo sapiens

ITGAD

Identifiers
- Aliases: ITGAD, ADB2, CD11D, integrin subunit alpha D
- External IDs: OMIM: 602453; MGI: 3578624; GeneCards: ITGAD

Gene location (Human)
Chr.	Chromosome 16 (human)
Band	16p11.2	Start	31,393,335 bp
Band	16p11.2	End	31,426,505 bp

Gene location (Mouse)
Chr.	Chromosome 7 (mouse)
Band	7|7 F3	Start	127,753,548 bp
Band	7|7 F3	End	127,822,988 bp
RNA expression pattern
Bgee	Human / Mouse (ortholog); Top expressed in: granulocyte; spleen; gastrocnemius muscle; lymph node; muscle of thigh; appendix; blood; decidua; right lobe of liver; gallbladder / Top expressed in: spleen; spermatid; testicle; spermatocyte; islet of Langerhans; bone marrow; embryo; granulocyte; thymus; primary oocyte; More reference expression data
BioGPS	n/a
Gene ontology
Molecular function	metal ion binding; protein heterodimerization activity
Cellular component	integral component of membrane; cell surface; integrin complex; plasma membrane; membrane
Biological process	integrin-mediated signaling pathway; heterotypic cell-cell adhesion; extracellular matrix organization; cell adhesion; immune response
Sources:Amigo / QuickGO
Orthologs
Databases	NCBI: entry; OMA: entry
Species	Human	Mouse
Entrez	3681	381924
Ensembl	ENSG00000156886	ENSMUSG00000070369
UniProt	Q13349	Q3V0T4
RefSeq (mRNA)	NM_005353; NM_001318185	NM_001029872; NM_001177632
RefSeq (protein)	NP_001305114; NP_005344	NP_001025043
Location (UCSC)	Chr 16: 31.39 – 31.43 Mb	Chr 7: 127.75 – 127.82 Mb
PubMed search
- Wikidata
View/Edit Human	View/Edit Mouse

Integrin alpha-D is a protein that in humans is encoded by the ITGAD gene.
