= Integrin alpha 8 =

Protein-coding gene in the species Homo sapiens

ITGA8

Identifiers
- Aliases: ITGA8, integrin subunit alpha 8
- External IDs: OMIM: 604063; MGI: 109442; GeneCards: ITGA8

Gene location (Human)
Chr.	Chromosome 10 (human)
Band	10p13	Start	15,513,954 bp
Band	10p13	End	15,719,922 bp

Gene location (Mouse)
Chr.	Chromosome 2 (mouse)
Band	2 A1|2 9.12 cM	Start	12,111,443 bp
Band	2 A1|2 9.12 cM	End	12,306,733 bp
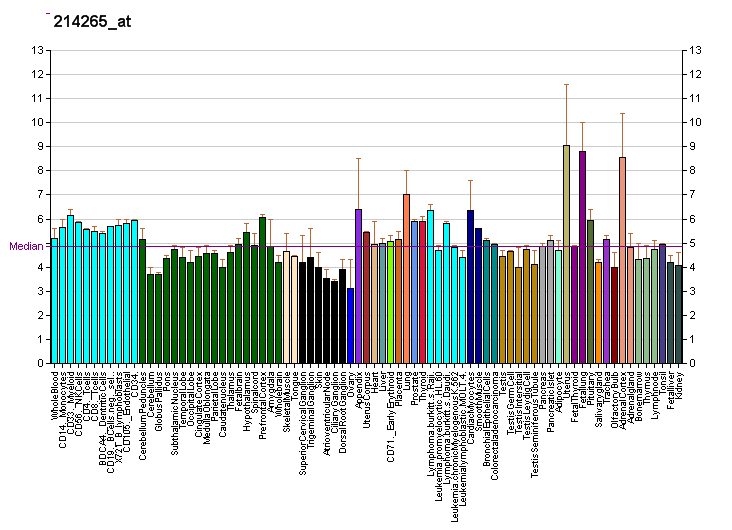
RNA expression pattern
Bgee	Human / Mouse (ortholog); Top expressed in: Descending thoracic aorta; ascending aorta; urethra; right coronary artery; saphenous vein; gastric mucosa; popliteal artery; tibial arteries; left coronary artery; vena cava / Top expressed in: ascending aorta; aortic valve; carotid body; right lung lobe; vas deferens; tunica media of zone of aorta; left lung lobe; vestibular membrane of cochlear duct; efferent ductule; conjunctival fornix; More reference expression data
BioGPS	More reference expression data
Gene ontology
Molecular function	metal ion binding
Cellular component	integral component of membrane; perikaryon; membrane; postsynaptic density; focal adhesion; integrin alpha8-beta1 complex; plasma membrane; apical part of cell; cell surface; integrin complex; endoplasmic reticulum; dendritic spine membrane
Biological process	positive regulation of transforming growth factor beta receptor signaling pathway; cell differentiation; kidney development; establishment of protein localization; extracellular matrix organization; memory; nervous system development; multicellular organism development; brain development; cell adhesion; cell projection organization; inner ear morphogenesis; positive regulation of transcription from RNA polymerase II promoter involved in smooth muscle cell differentiation; smooth muscle tissue development; mesodermal cell differentiation; integrin-mediated signaling pathway; substrate adhesion-dependent cell spreading; cell-matrix adhesion; metanephros development; cell-cell adhesion
Sources:Amigo / QuickGO
Orthologs
Databases	NCBI: entry; OMA: entry
Species	Human	Mouse
Entrez	8516	241226
Ensembl	ENSG00000077943	ENSMUSG00000026768
UniProt	P53708	A2ARA8
RefSeq (mRNA)	NM_001291494; NM_003638	NM_001001309
RefSeq (protein)	NP_001278423; NP_003629	NP_001001309; NP_001395029; NP_001395030; NP_001395031
Location (UCSC)	Chr 10: 15.51 – 15.72 Mb	Chr 2: 12.11 – 12.31 Mb
PubMed search
- Wikidata
View/Edit Human	View/Edit Mouse

Integrin alpha-8 is a protein that in humans is encoded by the ITGA8 gene.
