= Integrin beta 8 =

Protein-coding gene in the species Homo sapiens

ITGB8

Identifiers
- Aliases: ITGB8, integrin subunit beta 8
- External IDs: OMIM: 604160; MGI: 1338035; GeneCards: ITGB8

Gene location (Human)
Chr.	Chromosome 7 (human)
Band	7p21.1	Start	20,330,702 bp
Band	7p21.1	End	20,415,754 bp

Gene location (Mouse)
Chr.	Chromosome 12 (mouse)
Band	12|12 F2	Start	119,121,757 bp
Band	12|12 F2	End	119,202,537 bp
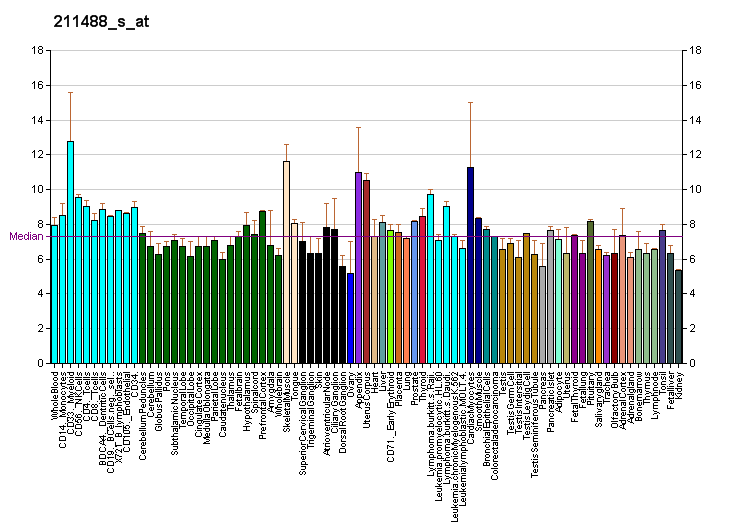

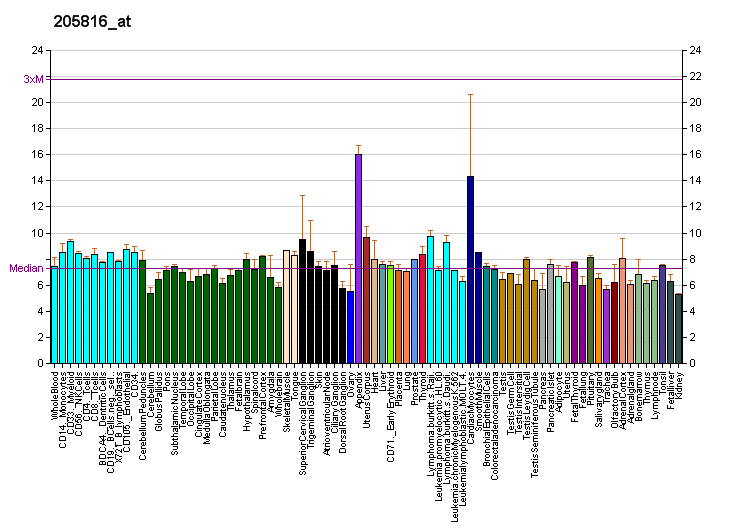
RNA expression pattern
Bgee	Human / Mouse (ortholog); Top expressed in: retinal pigment epithelium; external globus pallidus; ventricular zone; synovial joint; spinal ganglia; bronchial epithelial cell; corpus epididymis; mucosa of paranasal sinus; trigeminal ganglion; caput epididymis / Top expressed in: retinal pigment epithelium; Epithelium of choroid plexus; suprachiasmatic nucleus; deep cerebellar nuclei; olfactory tubercle; sciatic nerve; substantia nigra; otolith organ; utricle; medial vestibular nucleus; More reference expression data
BioGPS	More reference expression data
Gene ontology
Molecular function	signaling receptor binding; extracellular matrix protein binding; integrin binding; signaling receptor activity
Cellular component	integrin alphav-beta8 complex; integral component of membrane; cell surface; integrin complex; plasma membrane; extracellular exosome; membrane; focal adhesion
Biological process	integrin-mediated signaling pathway; cartilage development; placenta blood vessel development; cell adhesion; ganglioside metabolic process; positive regulation of gene expression; extracellular matrix organization; cell-matrix adhesion; negative regulation of gene expression; vasculogenesis; cell migration; cell adhesion mediated by integrin; positive regulation of angiogenesis; regulation of transforming growth factor beta activation
Sources:Amigo / QuickGO
Orthologs
Databases	NCBI: entry; OMA: entry
Species	Human	Mouse
Entrez	3696	320910
Ensembl	ENSG00000105855	ENSMUSG00000025321
UniProt	P26012	Q0VBD0
RefSeq (mRNA)	NM_002214	NM_177290
RefSeq (protein)	NP_002205	NP_796264
Location (UCSC)	Chr 7: 20.33 – 20.42 Mb	Chr 12: 119.12 – 119.2 Mb
PubMed search
- Wikidata
View/Edit Human	View/Edit Mouse

Integrin beta-8 is a protein that in humans is encoded by the ITGB8 gene.

== Function ==
This gene is a member of the integrin beta chain family and encodes a single-pass type I membrane protein with a VWFA domain and four cysteine-rich repeats. This protein noncovalently binds to an alpha subunit to form a heterodimeric integrin complex. In general, integrin complexes mediate cell-cell and cell-extracellular matrix interactions and this complex plays a role in human airway epithelial proliferation. Alternatively spliced variants which encode different protein isoforms have been described; however, not all the variants have been fully characterized. Additionally, it has been shown to interact with RhoGDI1 to alter the activation of Rho GTPases to promote Glioblastoma cell invasiveness. Uncoupling the αvβ8-RhoGDI1 interaction has been seen to block GBM cell invasion by hyperactivating Rho GTPases.

== Clinical significance ==
High expression levels of ITGB8 are associated with high angiogenic and poorly invasive glioblastoma tumors. Conversely low expression of ITGB8 correlates with highly invasive but low angiogenic tumors.
