= FERMT1 =

Protein-coding gene in the species Homo sapiens

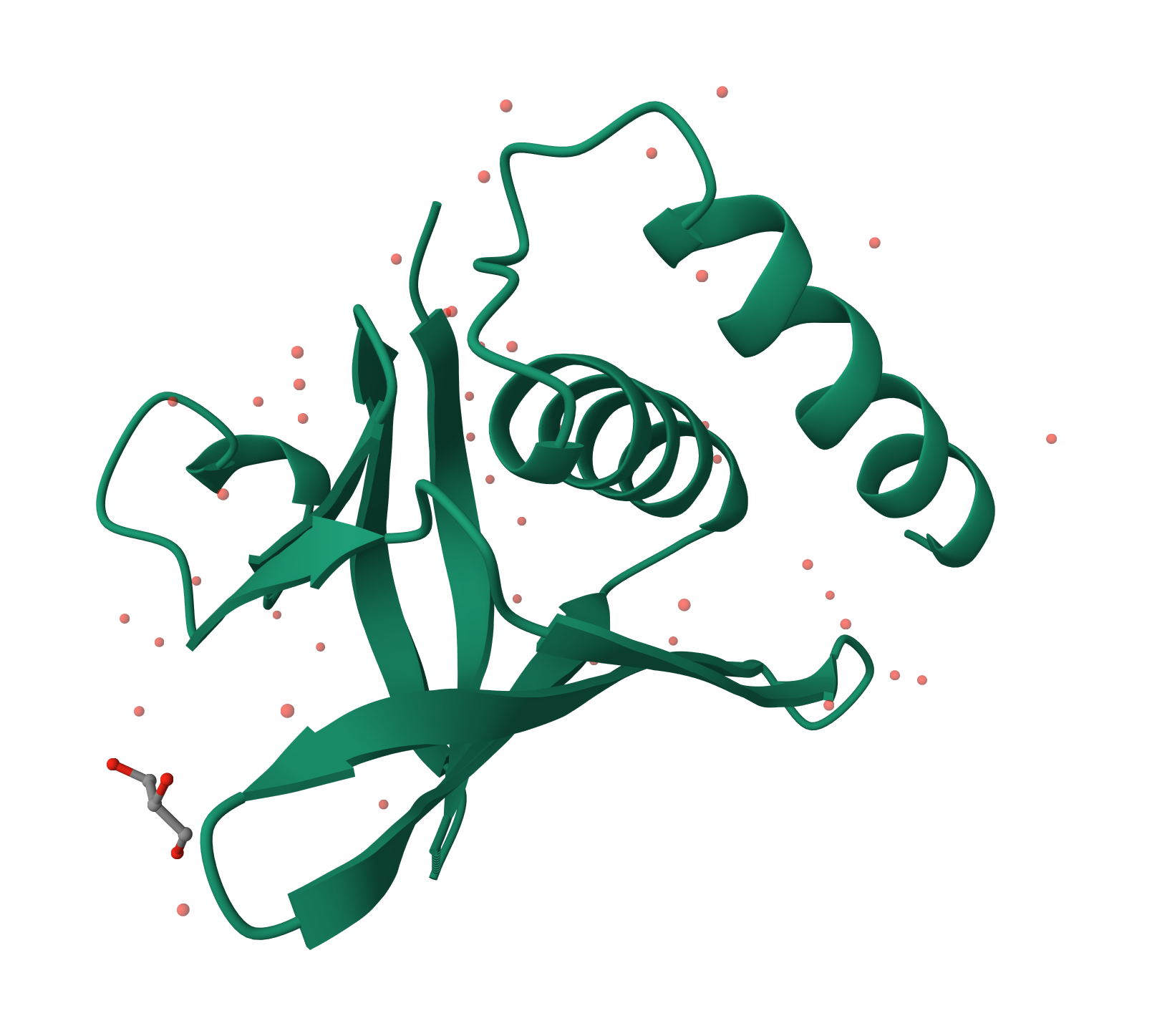

Identifiers
- Aliases: FERMT1, C20orf42, DTGCU2, KIND1, UNC112A, URP1, fermitin family member 1, FERM domain containing kindlin 1
- External IDs: OMIM: 607900; MGI: 2443583; GeneCards: FERMT1
Available structures
PDB	Ortholog search: PDBe RCSB
PDB	List of PDB id codes 2KMC, 4BBK

Gene location (Human)
Chr.	Chromosome 20 (human)
Band	20p12.3	Start	6,074,845 bp
Band	20p12.3	End	6,123,030 bp

Gene location (Mouse)
Chr.	Chromosome 2 (mouse)
Band	2|2 F2	Start	132,746,309 bp
Band	2|2 F2	End	132,787,826 bp
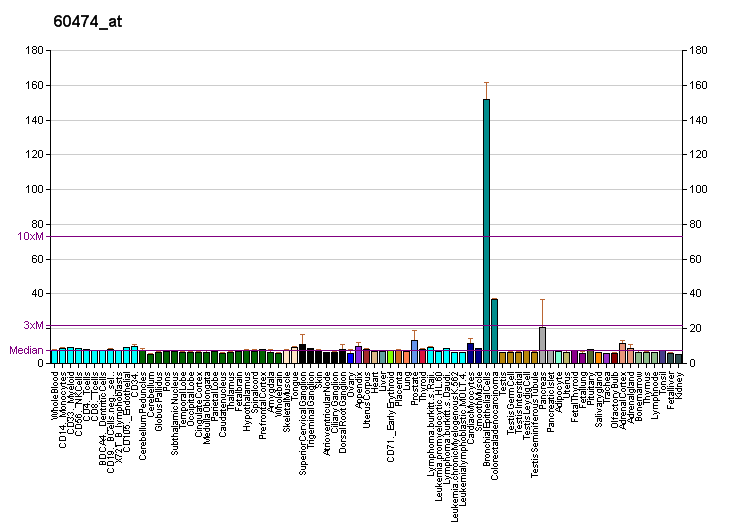

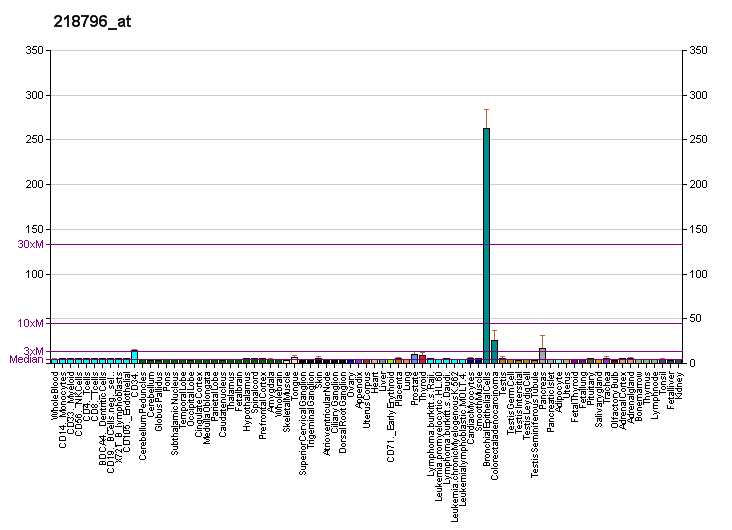
RNA expression pattern
Bgee	Human / Mouse (ortholog); Top expressed in: mucosa of sigmoid colon; gingival epithelium; hair follicle; rectum; pancreatic ductal cell; skin of thigh; mucosa of transverse colon; nipple; right adrenal cortex; human penis / Top expressed in: right kidney; colon; stomach; genital tubercle; proximal tubule; jejunum; ileum; duodenum; tail of embryo; human kidney; More reference expression data
BioGPS	More reference expression data
Gene ontology
Molecular function	actin filament binding
Cellular component	cell projection; ruffle membrane; cytosol; cell junction; filamentous actin; plasma membrane; membrane; focal adhesion; cytoplasm; cytoskeleton
Biological process	keratinocyte proliferation; cell adhesion; keratinocyte migration; establishment of epithelial cell polarity; positive regulation of cell-matrix adhesion; negative regulation of gene expression; positive regulation of transforming growth factor beta receptor signaling pathway; positive regulation of cell adhesion mediated by integrin; negative regulation of protein import into nucleus; negative regulation of timing of anagen; basement membrane organization; negative regulation of canonical Wnt signaling pathway; negative regulation of stem cell proliferation; integrin-mediated signaling pathway
Sources:Amigo / QuickGO
Orthologs
Databases	NCBI: entry; OMA: entry
Species	Human	Mouse
Entrez	55612	241639
Ensembl	ENSG00000101311	ENSMUSG00000027356
UniProt	Q9BQL6	P59113
RefSeq (mRNA)	NM_017671	NM_198029
RefSeq (protein)	NP_060141	NP_932146
Location (UCSC)	Chr 20: 6.07 – 6.12 Mb	Chr 2: 132.75 – 132.79 Mb
PubMed search
- Wikidata
View/Edit Human	View/Edit Mouse

Fermitin family homolog 1 is a protein that in humans is encoded by the FERMT1 gene.
