= Alpha-5 beta-1 =

α_{5}β_{1}, also known as the fibronectin receptor, is an integrin that binds to matrix macromolecules and proteinases and thereby stimulates angiogenesis. It is composed of α_{5} (ITGA5/CD49e) and β_{1} (ITGB1/CD29) subunits. It is the primary receptor for fibronectin. The interaction of VLA-5 with fibronectin plays an important role in regulating inflammatory cytokine production by human articular chondrocytes (From the Cell Migration Gateway ITGA5 ITGB1).

α_{5}β_{1}-integrin is transported inside the cell by the kinesin KIF1C, a kinesin-3 organelle transporter that walks along microtubules.
