= HGFAC =

Protein-coding gene in humans

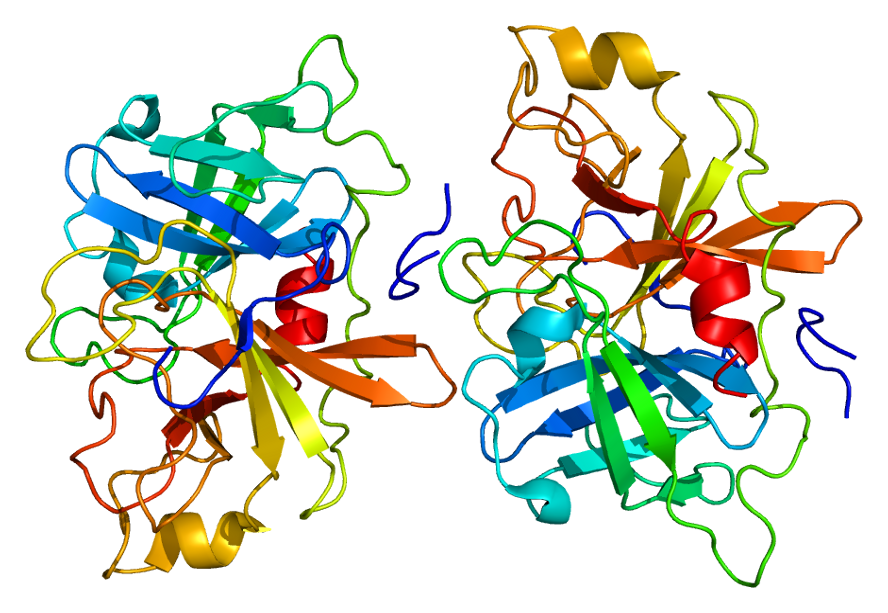

Identifiers
- Aliases: HGFAC, HGFA, HGF activator
- External IDs: OMIM: 604552; MGI: 1859281; GeneCards: HGFAC
Available structures
PDB	Ortholog search: PDBe RCSB
PDB	List of PDB id codes 1YBW, 1YC0, 2R0K, 2R0L, 2WUB, 2WUC, 3K2U

Gene location (Human)
Chr.	Chromosome 4 (human)
Band	4p16.3	Start	3,441,968 bp
Band	4p16.3	End	3,449,486 bp

Gene location (Mouse)
Chr.	Chromosome 5 (mouse)
Band	5|5 B2	Start	35,198,853 bp
Band	5|5 B2	End	35,205,805 bp
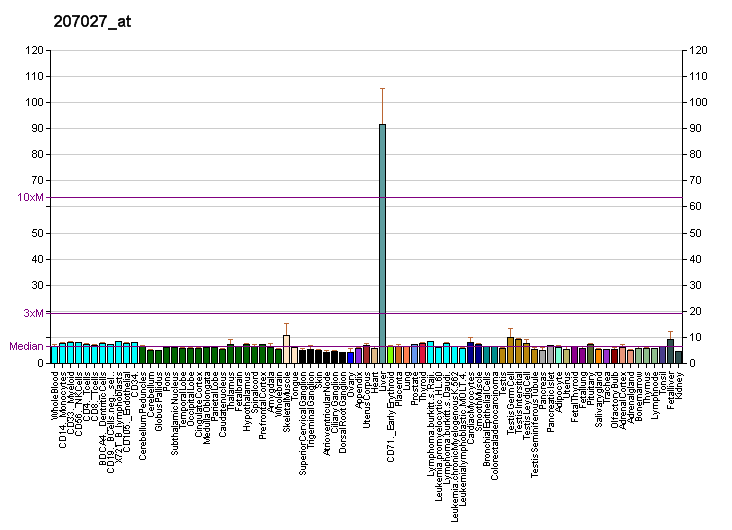
RNA expression pattern
Bgee	Human / Mouse (ortholog); Top expressed in: right lobe of liver; right testis; left testis; right hemisphere of cerebellum; right uterine tube; ganglionic eminence; testicle; right frontal lobe; ventricular zone; anterior pituitary / Top expressed in: left lobe of liver; crypt of lieberkuhn of small intestine; large intestine; islet of Langerhans; left colon; duodenum; pyloric antrum; fetal liver hematopoietic progenitor cell; right kidney; jejunum; More reference expression data
BioGPS	More reference expression data
Gene ontology
Molecular function	peptidase activity; serine-type peptidase activity; serine-type endopeptidase activity; hydrolase activity
Cellular component	extracellular region; extracellular space; cytosol; rough endoplasmic reticulum
Biological process	proteolysis
Sources:Amigo / QuickGO
Orthologs
Databases	NCBI: entry; OMA: entry
Species	Human	Mouse
Entrez	3083	54426
Ensembl	ENSG00000109758	ENSMUSG00000029102
UniProt	Q04756	Q9R098
RefSeq (mRNA)	NM_001297439; NM_001528	NM_019447
RefSeq (protein)	NP_001284368; NP_001519	NP_062320
Location (UCSC)	Chr 4: 3.44 – 3.45 Mb	Chr 5: 35.2 – 35.21 Mb
PubMed search
- Wikidata
View/Edit Human	View/Edit Mouse

Hepatocyte growth factor activator is a protein that in humans is encoded by the HGFAC gene.

The protein encoded by this gene, belongs to peptidase family S1. It is first synthesized as an inactive single-chain precursor before being activated to a heterodimeric form by endoproteolytic processing. It acts as serine protease that converts hepatocyte growth factor to the active form.
