= PDC-109 =

PDC-109 is a major bovine seminal plasma protein. In bovine semen its concentration is about 15–20 mg/ml, which comprises about 60 percent of total proteins present in the bovine seminal plasma.

A characteristic feature of this protein is that it contains two fibronectin type 2 (Fn2) domain. Each domain in this protein binds to lipid head group with cation-pi interaction.
