= Fibronectin =

Protein involved in cell adhesion, cell growth, cell migration and differentiation

FN1
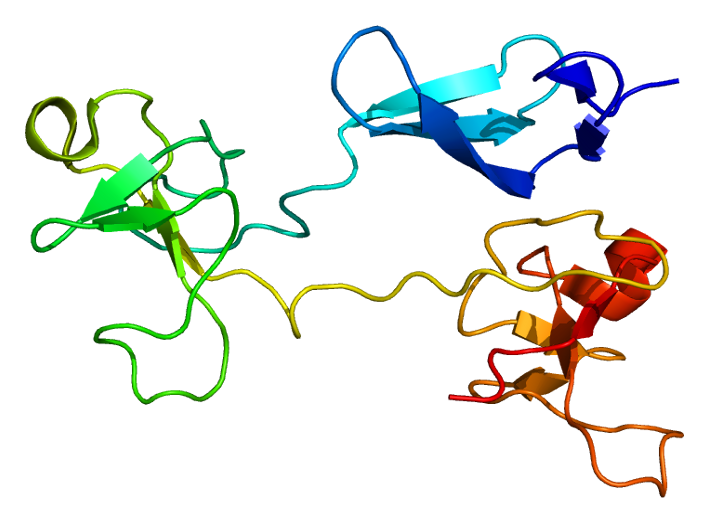

Identifiers
- Aliases: FN1, CIG, ED-B, FINC, FN, FNZ, GFND, GFND2, LETS, MSF, fibronectin 1, SMDCF
- External IDs: OMIM: 135600; MGI: 95566; GeneCards: FN1
Available structures
PDB	Ortholog search: H0Y7Z1%20or%20B7ZLE5 PDBe H0Y7Z1,B7ZLE5 RCSB
PDB	List of PDB id codes 1E88, 1E8B, 1FBR, 1FNA, 1FNF, 1FNH, 1J8K, 1O9A, 1OWW, 1Q38, 1QGB, 1QO6, 1TTF, 1TTG, 2CG6, 2CG7, 2CK2, 2CKU, 2EC3, 2FN2, 2FNB, 2GEE, 2H41, 2H45, 2HA1, 2OCF, 2RKY, 2RKZ, 2RL0, 3CAL, 3EJH, 3GXE, 3M7P, 3MQL, 3R8Q, 3ZRZ, 4GH7, 4JE4, 4JEG, 4LXO, 4MMX, 4MMY, 4MMZ, 4PZ5, 2N1K, 5DC4, 5DC0, 5DC9, 3T1W

Gene location (Human)
Chr.	Chromosome 2 (human)
Band	2q35	Start	215,360,440 bp
Band	2q35	End	215,436,073 bp

Gene location (Mouse)
Chr.	Chromosome 1 (mouse)
Band	1 C3|1 36.05 cM	Start	71,624,679 bp
Band	1 C3|1 36.05 cM	End	71,692,359 bp
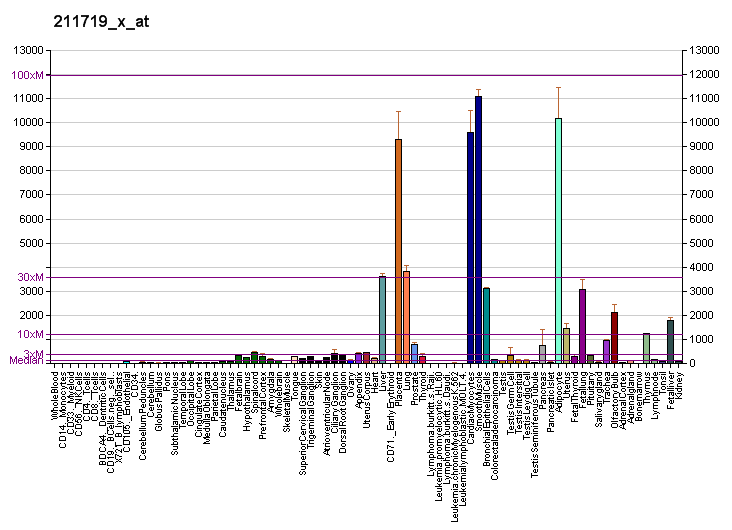

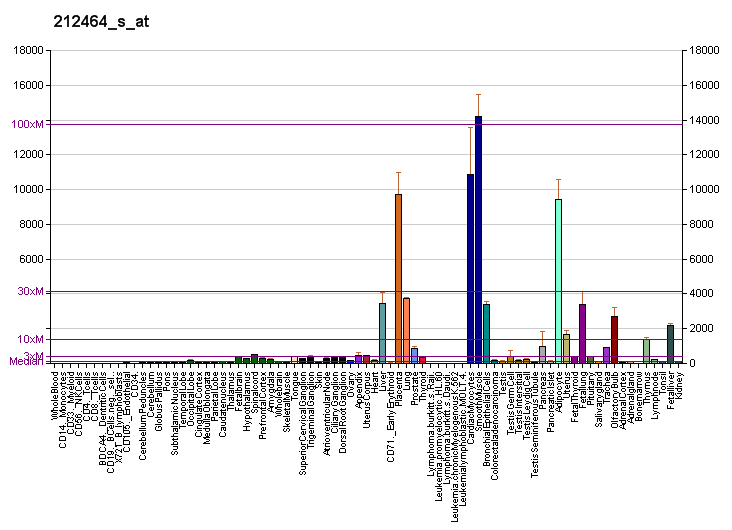

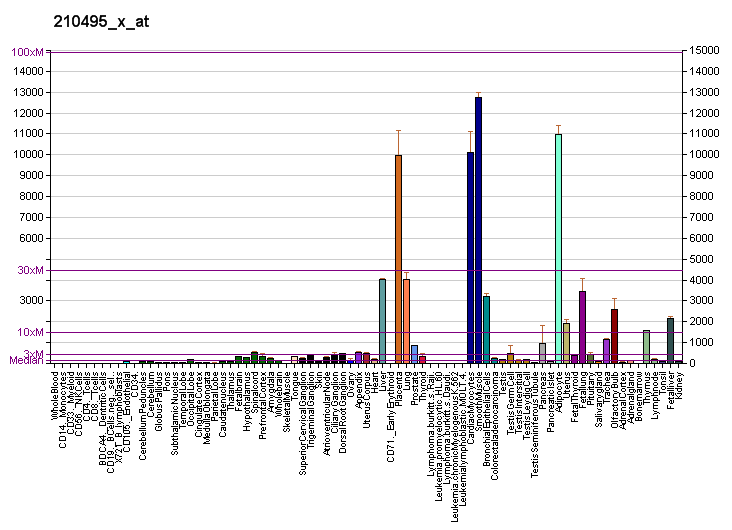
RNA expression pattern
Bgee	Human / Mouse (ortholog); Top expressed in: synovial joint; right coronary artery; decidua; Descending thoracic aorta; synovial membrane; ascending aorta; tibia; tendon of biceps brachii; stromal cell of endometrium; left coronary artery / Top expressed in: calvaria; stroma of bone marrow; tunica media of zone of aorta; umbilical cord; left lung lobe; ankle; tail of embryo; tibiofemoral joint; endothelial cell of lymphatic vessel; atrium; More reference expression data
BioGPS	More reference expression data
Gene ontology
Molecular function	heparin binding; collagen binding; integrin binding; protein binding; identical protein binding; peptidase activator activity; protease binding
Cellular component	blood microparticle; extracellular matrix; fibrinogen complex; extracellular region; basement membrane; apical plasma membrane; extracellular exosome; platelet alpha granule lumen; endoplasmic reticulum-Golgi intermediate compartment; extracellular fluid
Biological process	regulation of protein phosphorylation; calcium-independent cell-matrix adhesion; endodermal cell differentiation; positive regulation of fibroblast proliferation; positive regulation of substrate-dependent cell migration, cell attachment to substrate; platelet degranulation; extracellular matrix disassembly; wound healing; positive regulation of peptidase activity; peptide cross-linking; cell adhesion; positive regulation of gene expression; acute-phase response; angiogenesis; positive regulation of cell population proliferation; regulation of cell shape; regulation of ERK1 and ERK2 cascade; cell-substrate junction assembly; substrate adhesion-dependent cell spreading; integrin activation; positive regulation of axon extension; cell-matrix adhesion; leukocyte migration; response to wounding; extracellular matrix organization
Sources:Amigo / QuickGO
Orthologs
Databases	NCBI: entry; OMA: entry
Species	Human	Mouse
Entrez	2335	14268
Ensembl	ENSG00000115414	ENSMUSG00000026193
UniProt	P02751	P11276
RefSeq (mRNA)	NM_001306129; NM_001306130; NM_001306131; NM_001306132; NM_002026 NM_054034; NM_212474; NM_212475; NM_212476; NM_212478; NM_212482; NM_001365517; NM_001365518; NM_001365519; NM_001365520; NM_001365521; NM_001365522; NM_001365523; NM_001365524	NM_001276408; NM_001276409; NM_001276410; NM_001276411; NM_001276412 NM_001276413; NM_010233
RefSeq (protein)	NP_001293058; NP_001293059; NP_001293060; NP_001293061; NP_002017 NP_473375; NP_997639; NP_997641; NP_997643; NP_997647; NP_001352446; NP_001352447; NP_001352448; NP_001352449; NP_001352450; NP_001352451; NP_001352452; NP_001352453; NP_001293058.1; NP_001293059.1; NP_001293061.1	NP_001263337; NP_001263338; NP_001263339; NP_001263340; NP_001263341 NP_001263342; NP_034363
Location (UCSC)	Chr 2: 215.36 – 215.44 Mb	Chr 1: 71.62 – 71.69 Mb
PubMed search
- Wikidata
View/Edit Human	View/Edit Mouse

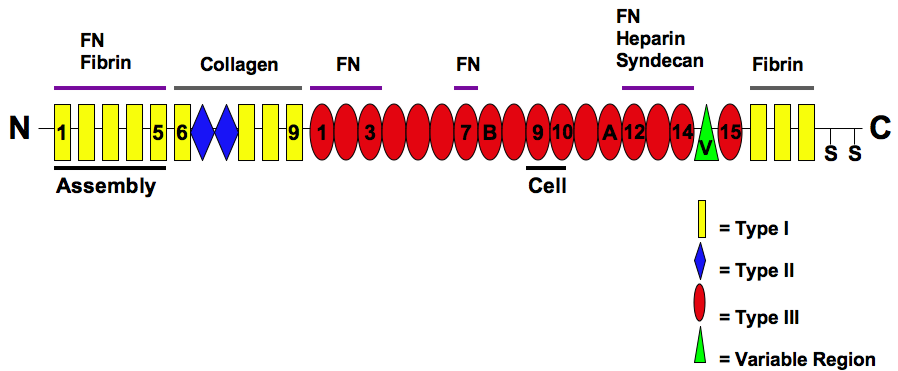
The modular structure of fibronectin and its binding domains

Fibronectin is a high molecular weight (approximately 500–600 kDa) glycoprotein of the extracellular matrix that binds to membrane-spanning receptor proteins called integrins. Fibronectin also binds to other extracellular matrix proteins such as collagen, fibrin, and heparan sulfate proteoglycans (e.g. syndecans).

Fibronectin exists as a protein dimer, consisting of two nearly identical monomers linked by a pair of disulfide bonds. The fibronectin protein is produced from a single gene, but alternative splicing of its pre-mRNA leads to the creation of several isoforms.

Two types of fibronectin are present in vertebrates:

- soluble plasma fibronectin (formerly called "cold-insoluble globulin", or CIg) is a major protein component of blood plasma (300 μg/ml) and is produced in the liver by hepatocytes.
- insoluble cellular fibronectin is a major component of the extracellular matrix. It is secreted by various cells, primarily fibroblasts, as a soluble protein dimer and is then assembled into an insoluble matrix in a complex cell-mediated process.

Fibronectin plays a major role in cell adhesion, growth, migration, and differentiation, and it is important for processes such as wound healing and embryonic development. Altered fibronectin expression, degradation, and organization has been associated with a number of pathologies, including cancer, arthritis, and fibrosis.

== Structure ==
Fibronectin exists as a protein dimer, consisting of two nearly identical polypeptide chains linked by a pair of C-terminal disulfide bonds. Each fibronectin subunit has a molecular weight of approximately 230–275 kDa and contains multiple copies of three types of modules: type I, II, and III. All three modules are composed of two anti-parallel β-sheets resulting in a beta-sandwich; however, type I and type II are stabilized by intra-chain disulfide bonds, while type III modules do not contain any disulfide bonds. The absence of disulfide bonds in type III modules allows them to partially unfold under applied force.

Three regions of variable splicing occur along the length of the fibronectin protomer. One or both of the "extra" type III modules (EIIIA and EIIIB) may be present in cellular fibronectin, but they are never present in plasma fibronectin. A "variable" V-region exists between III_{14–15} (the 14th and 15th type III module). The V-region structure is different from the type I, II, and III modules, and its presence and length may vary. The V-region contains the binding site for α4β1 integrins. It is present in most cellular fibronectin, but only one of the two subunits in a plasma fibronectin dimer contains a V-region sequence.

The modules are arranged into several functional and protein-binding domains along the length of a fibronectin monomer. There are four fibronectin-binding domains, allowing fibronectin to associate with other fibronectin molecules. One of these fibronectin-binding domains, I_{1–5}, is referred to as the "assembly domain", and it is required for the initiation of fibronectin matrix assembly. Modules III_{9–10} correspond to the "cell-binding domain" of fibronectin. The RGD sequence (Arg–Gly–Asp) is located in III_{10} and is the site of cell attachment via α5β1 and αVβ3 integrins on the cell surface. The "synergy site" is in III_{9} and has a role in modulating fibronectin's association with α5β1 integrins. Fibronectin also contains domains for fibrin-binding (I_{1–5}, I_{10–12}), collagen-binding (I_{6–9}), fibulin-1-binding (III_{13–14}), heparin-binding and syndecan-binding (III_{12–14}).

== Function ==
Fibronectin has numerous functions that ensure the normal functioning of vertebrate organisms. It is involved in cell adhesion, growth, migration, and differentiation. Cellular fibronectin is assembled into the extracellular matrix, an insoluble network that separates and supports the organs and tissues of an organism.

Fibronectin plays a crucial role in wound healing. Along with fibrin, plasma fibronectin is deposited at the site of injury, forming a blood clot that stops bleeding and protects the underlying tissue. As repair of the injured tissue continues, fibroblasts and macrophages begin to remodel the area, degrading the proteins that form the provisional blood clot matrix and replacing them with a matrix that more resembles the normal, surrounding tissue. Fibroblasts secrete proteases, including matrix metalloproteinases, that digest the plasma fibronectin, and then the fibroblasts secrete cellular fibronectin and assemble it into an insoluble matrix. Fragmentation of fibronectin by proteases has been suggested to promote wound contraction, a critical step in wound healing. Fragmenting fibronectin further exposes its V-region, which contains the site for α4β1 integrin binding. These fragments of fibronectin are believed to enhance the binding of α4β1 integrin-expressing cells, allowing them to adhere to and forcefully contract the surrounding matrix.

Fibronectin is necessary for embryogenesis, and inactivating the gene for fibronectin results in early embryonic lethality. Fibronectin is important for guiding cell attachment and migration during embryonic development. In mammalian development, the absence of fibronectin leads to defects in mesodermal, neural tube, and vascular development. Similarly, the absence of a normal fibronectin matrix in developing amphibians causes defects in mesodermal patterning and inhibits gastrulation.

Fibronectin is also found in normal human saliva, which helps prevent colonization of the oral cavity and pharynx by pathogenic bacteria.

== Matrix assembly ==
Cellular fibronectin is assembled into an insoluble fibrillar matrix in a complex cell-mediated process. Fibronectin matrix assembly begins when soluble, compact fibronectin dimers are secreted from cells, often fibroblasts. These soluble dimers bind to α5β1 integrin receptors on the cell surface and aid in clustering the integrins. The local concentration of integrin-bound fibronectin increases, allowing bound fibronectin molecules to more readily interact with one another. Short fibronectin fibrils then begin to form between adjacent cells. As matrix assembly proceeds, the soluble fibrils are converted into larger insoluble fibrils that comprise the extracellular matrix.

Fibronectin's shift from soluble to insoluble fibrils proceeds when cryptic fibronectin-binding sites are exposed along the length of a bound fibronectin molecule. Cells are believed to stretch fibronectin by pulling on their fibronectin-bound integrin receptors. This force partially unfolds the fibronectin ligand, unmasking cryptic fibronectin-binding sites and allowing nearby fibronectin molecules to associate. This fibronectin-fibronectin interaction enables the soluble, cell-associated fibrils to branch and stabilize into an insoluble fibronectin matrix.

A transmembrane protein, CD93, has been shown to be essential for fibronectin matrix assembly (fibrillogenesis) in human dermal blood endothelial cells. As a consequence, knockdown of CD93 in these cells resulted in the disruption of the fibronectin fibrillogenesis. Moreover, the CD93 knockout mice retinas displayed disrupted fibronectin matrix at the retinal sprouting front.

== Role in cancer ==
Several morphological changes has been observed in tumors and tumor-derived cell lines that have been attributed to decreased fibronectin expression, increased fibronectin degradation, and/or decreased expression of fibronectin-binding receptors, such as α5β1 integrins.

Fibronectin has been implicated in carcinoma development. In lung carcinoma, fibronectin expression is increased especially in non-small cell lung carcinoma. The adhesion of lung carcinoma cells to fibronectin enhances tumorigenicity and confers resistance to apoptosis-inducing chemotherapeutic agents. Fibronectin has been shown to stimulate the gonadal steroids that interact with vertebrate androgen receptors, which are capable of controlling the expression of cyclin D and related genes involved in cell cycle control. These observations suggest that fibronectin may promote lung tumor growth/survival and resistance to therapy, and it could represent a novel target for the development of new anticancer drugs.

Fibronectin 1 acts as a potential biomarker for radioresistance and for pan-cancer prognosis.

FN1-FGFR1 fusion is frequent in phosphaturic mesenchymal tumours.

== Role in wound healing ==
Fibronectin has profound effects on wound healing, including the formation of proper substratum for migration and growth of cells during the development and organization of granulation tissue, as well as remodeling and resynthesis of the connective tissue matrix. The biological significance of fibronectin in vivo was studied during the mechanism of wound healing. Plasma fibronectin levels are decreased in acute inflammation or following surgical trauma and in patients with disseminated intravascular coagulation.

Fibronectin is located in the extracellular matrix of embryonic and adult tissues (not in the basement membranes of the adult tissues), but may be more widely distributed in inflammatory lesions. During blood clotting, the fibronectin remains associated with the clot, covalently cross-linked to fibrin with the help of Factor XIII (fibrin-stabilizing factor). Fibroblasts play a major role in wound healing by adhering to fibrin. Fibroblast adhesion to fibrin requires fibronectin, and was strongest when the fibronectin was cross-linked to the fibrin. Patients with Factor XIII deficiencies display impairment in wound healing as fibroblasts don't grow well in fibrin lacking Factor XIII. Fibronectin promotes particle phagocytosis by both macrophages and fibroblasts. Collagen deposition at the wound site by fibroblasts takes place with the help of fibronectin. Fibronectin was also observed to be closely associated with the newly deposited collagen fibrils. Based on the size and histological staining characteristics of the fibrils, it is likely that at least in part they are composed of type III collagen (reticulin). An in vitro study with native collagen demonstrated that fibronectin binds to type III collagen rather than other types.

== Fibronectin genetic variation as a protective factor against Alzheimer's disease ==
A specific genetic variation in Fibronectin gene was shown to reduce the risk of developing Alzheimer's disease in a multicenter, multiethnic genetic epidemiology and functional genomics study. This effect is believed to be through enhancing the brain's ability to clear the toxic waste and protein accumulation through the blood–brain barrier.

A follow-up mechanistic study showed that astrocyte-derived fibronectin accumulates at the gliovascular interface in the presence of the APOE ε4 allele, disrupting VEGFA/HB-EGF/IGF-1 growth factor signaling and causing blood–brain barrier leakage, thereby establishing fibronectin as a mediator of APOE4-driven vascular dysfunction in Alzheimer's disease.

== Interactions ==
Besides integrin, fibronectin binds to many other host and non-host molecules. For example, it has been shown to interact with proteins such fibrin, tenascin, TNF-α, BMP-1, rotavirus NSP-4, and many fibronectin-binding proteins from bacteria (like FBP-A; FBP-B on the N-terminal domain), as well as the glycosaminoglycan, heparan sulfate.

pUR4 is a recombinant peptide that is known to inhibit the polymerization of fibronectin in a number of cell types including fibroblasts and endothelial cells.

Fibronectin has been shown to interact with:

- CD44
- COL7A1,
- LPA,
- IGFBP3,
- TNC, and
- TRIB3.

== See also ==
- Fetal fibronectin
- Fibronectin type I domain
- Fibronectin type II domain
- Fibronectin type III domain
- Monobody, an engineered antibody mimetic based on the structure of the fibronectin type III domain
- Substrate adhesion molecules
