= Integrin beta 5 =

Protein-coding gene in the species Homo sapiens

ITGB5

Identifiers
- Aliases: ITGB5, Integrin, beta 5, integrin subunit beta 5
- External IDs: OMIM: 147561; MGI: 96614; GeneCards: ITGB5

Gene location (Human)
Chr.	Chromosome 3 (human)
Band	3q21.2	Start	124,761,948 bp
Band	3q21.2	End	124,901,418 bp

Gene location (Mouse)
Chr.	Chromosome 16 (mouse)
Band	16|16 B3	Start	33,650,035 bp
Band	16|16 B3	End	33,769,708 bp
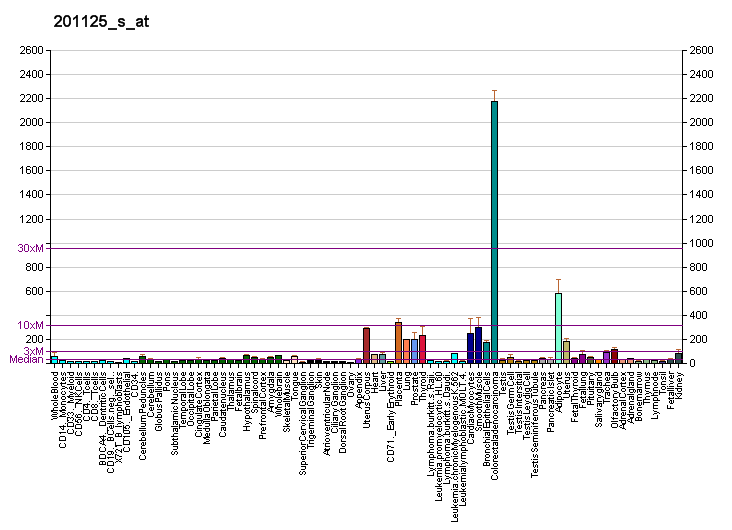

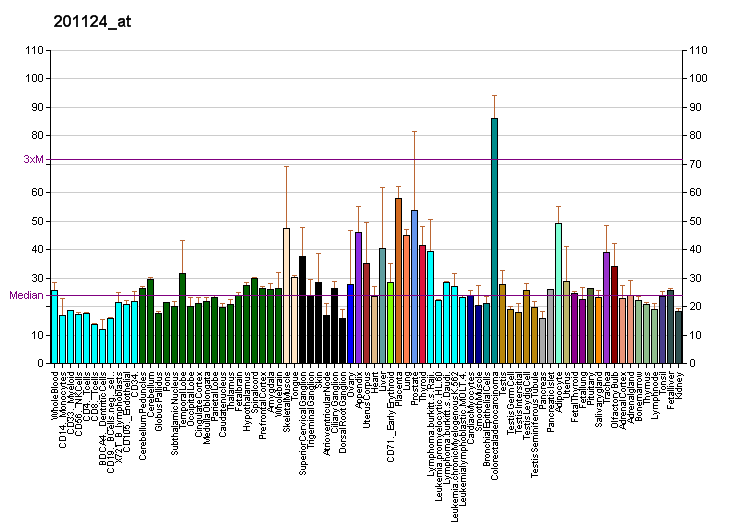
RNA expression pattern
Bgee	Human / Mouse (ortholog); Top expressed in: stromal cell of endometrium; right coronary artery; ascending aorta; Descending thoracic aorta; pancreatic ductal cell; tendon of biceps brachii; cartilage tissue; left coronary artery; metanephric glomerulus; popliteal artery / Top expressed in: tunica media of zone of aorta; epithelium of lens; decidua; calvaria; ciliary body; molar; external carotid artery; gastrula; stria vascularis; stroma of bone marrow; More reference expression data
BioGPS	More reference expression data
Gene ontology
Molecular function	virus receptor activity; protein binding; integrin binding; signaling receptor activity
Cellular component	integral component of membrane; membrane; focal adhesion; receptor complex; plasma membrane; cell surface; integrin complex; phagocytic vesicle; integrin alphav-beta5 complex; extracellular exosome
Biological process	muscle contraction; endodermal cell differentiation; antigen processing and presentation of exogenous peptide antigen via MHC class I, TAP-dependent; extracellular matrix organization; epithelial cell-cell adhesion; stress fiber assembly; cell adhesion; integrin-mediated signaling pathway; viral entry into host cell; cell-matrix adhesion; viral process; transforming growth factor beta receptor signaling pathway; cell migration; cell adhesion mediated by integrin
Sources:Amigo / QuickGO
Orthologs
Databases	NCBI: entry; OMA: entry
Species	Human	Mouse
Entrez	3693	16419
Ensembl	ENSG00000082781	ENSMUSG00000022817
UniProt	P18084	O70309
RefSeq (mRNA)	NM_002213; NM_001354764; NM_001354765; NM_001354766	NM_001145884; NM_010580
RefSeq (protein)	NP_002204; NP_001341693; NP_001341694; NP_001341695	NP_001139356; NP_034710; NP_001391992
Location (UCSC)	Chr 3: 124.76 – 124.9 Mb	Chr 16: 33.65 – 33.77 Mb
PubMed search
- Wikidata
View/Edit Human	View/Edit Mouse

Integrin beta-5 is a protein that in humans is encoded by the ITGB5 gene.

== Interactions ==
Integrin, beta 5 has been shown to interact with PTK2, Annexin A5 and PAK4.

== Functions ==
ITGB5 encodes a subunit of integrin that can interact with the integrin alpha v to form the integrin alpha v beta 5 integrin heterodimer. Integrin alpha V beta 5 is a receptor for the extracellular matrix protein Vitronectin and can form both focal adhesions and reticular adhesions.

== Clinical significance ==
=== Research ===
Elevated levels of ITGB5 have been found in patients with autosomal dominant osteopetrosis type II, a rare disease of bones.
