= Masp =

MASP is an abbreviation for:

- São Paulo Museum of Art (in Portuguese, Museu de Arte de São Paulo)
- Peruvian Port in Arica (in Spanish, Muelle al servicio del Perú en Arica)
- Mid Atlantic Star Party
- MaSP NGO Malawi Scotland Partnership
- MASP (protein)
- MASP1 (protein)
- MASP2 (protein)
