= Mannose-binding protein-associated serine protease =

Mannose-binding protein-associated serine protease are serine proteases involved in the complement system.

Types include:

- MASP1
- MASP2

== See also ==
- mannan-binding lectin
