= Immune response =

Reaction occurring within an organism as a defence against a pathogen

An immune response is a physiological reaction which occurs within an organism in the context of inflammation for the purpose of defending against exogenous factors. These include a wide variety of different toxins, viruses, intra- and extracellular bacteria, protozoa, helminths, and fungi which could cause serious problems to the health of the host organism if not cleared from the body.

In addition, there are other forms of immune response. For example, harmless exogenous factors (such as pollen and food components) can trigger allergy; latex and metals are also known allergens. A transplanted tissue (for example, blood) or organ can cause graft-versus-host disease. A type of immune reactivity known as Rh disease can be observed in pregnant women. These special forms of immune response are classified as hypersensitivity. Another special form of immune response is antitumor immunity.

In general, there are two branches of the immune response, created by the innate immune system and the adaptive immune system respectively, which work together to protect against pathogens. Both branches engage humoral and cellular components.

The innate branch—the body's first reaction to an invader—is known to be a non-specific and quick response to any sort of pathogen. Components of the innate immune response include physical barriers like the skin and mucous membranes, immune cells such as neutrophils, macrophages, and monocytes, and soluble factors including cytokines and complement. On the other hand, the adaptive branch is the body's immune response which is catered against specific antigens and thus, it takes longer to activate the components involved. The adaptive branch include cells such as dendritic cells, T cell, and B cells as well as antibodies—also known as immunoglobulins—which directly interact with antigen and are a very important component for a strong response against an invader.

The first contact that an organism has with a particular antigen will result in the production of effector T and B cells which are activated cells that defend against the pathogen. The production of these effector cells as a result of the first-time exposure is called a primary immune response. Memory T and memory B cells are also produced in the case that the same pathogen enters the organism again. If the organism does happen to become re-exposed to the same pathogen, a secondary immune response will kick in and the immune system will be able to respond in both a fast and strong manner because of the memory cells from the first exposure. Vaccines introduce a weakened, killed, or fragmented microorganism in order to evoke a primary immune response. This is so that in the case that an exposure to the real pathogen occurs, the body can rely on the secondary immune response to quickly defend against it.

== Innate part ==
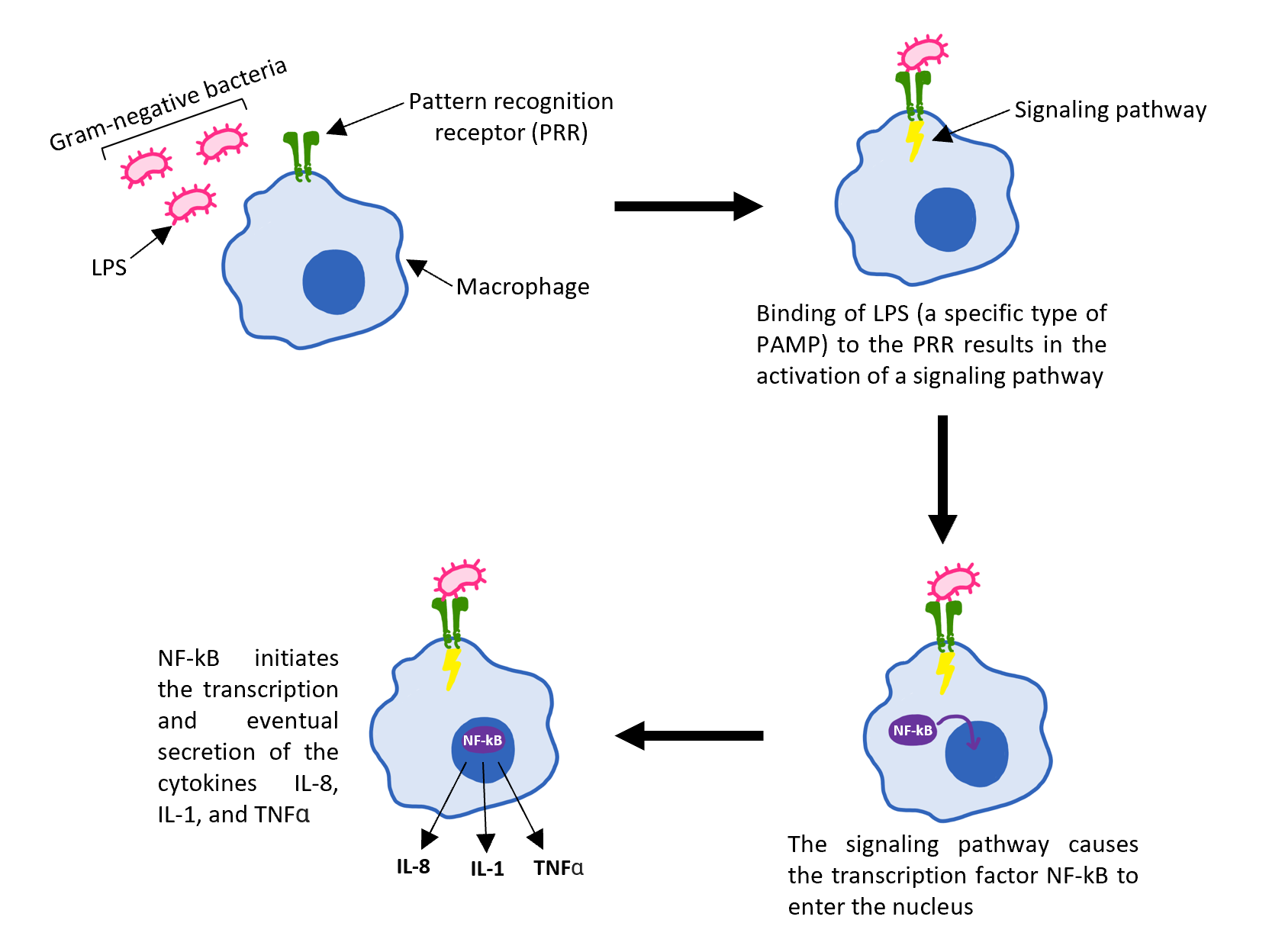
Innate immune response to a gram-negative bacteria invasion

The innate immune response is an organism's first response to foreign invaders. This immune response is evolutionarily conserved across many different species, with all multi-cellular organisms having some sort of variation of an innate response. The innate immune system consists of physical barriers such as skin and mucous membranes, various cell types like neutrophils, macrophages, and monocytes, and soluble factors including cytokines and complement. In contrast to the adaptive immune response, the innate response is not specific to any one foreign invader and as a result, works quickly to rid the body of pathogens.

Pathogens are recognized and detected via pattern recognition receptors (PRR). These receptors are structures on the surface of macrophages which are capable of binding foreign invaders and thus initiating cell signaling within the immune cell. Specifically, the PRRs identify pathogen-associated molecular patterns (PAMPs) which are integral structural components of pathogens. Examples of PAMPs include the peptidoglycan cell wall or lipopolysaccharides (LPS), both of which are essential components of bacteria and are therefore evolutionarily conserved across many different bacterial species.

When a foreign pathogen bypasses the physical barriers and enters an organism, the PRRs on macrophages will recognize and bind to specific PAMPs. This binding results in the activation of a signaling pathway which allows for the transcription factor NF-κB to enter the nucleus of the macrophage and initiate the transcription and eventual secretion of various cytokines such as IL-8, IL-1, and TNFα. Release of these cytokines is necessary for the entry of neutrophils from the blood vessels to the infected tissue. Once neutrophils enter the tissue, like macrophages, they are able to phagocytize and kill any pathogens or microbes.

Complement, another component of the innate immune system, consists of three pathways that are activated in distinct ways. The classical pathway is triggered when IgG or IgM is bound to its target antigen on either the pathogen cell membrane or an antigen-bound antibody. The alternative pathway is activated by foreign surfaces such as viruses, fungi, bacteria, parasites, etc., and is capable of autoactivation due to “tickover” of C3. The lectin pathway is triggered when mannose-binding lectin (MBL) or ficolin aka specific pattern recognition receptors bind to pathogen-associated molecular patterns on the surface of invading microorganisms such as yeast, bacteria, parasites, and viruses. Each of the three pathways ensures that complement will still be functional if one pathway ceases to work or a foreign invader is able to evade one of these pathways (defense in depth principle). Though the pathways are activated differently, the overall role of the complement system is to opsonize pathogens and induce a series of inflammatory responses that help to combat infection.

== Adaptive part ==
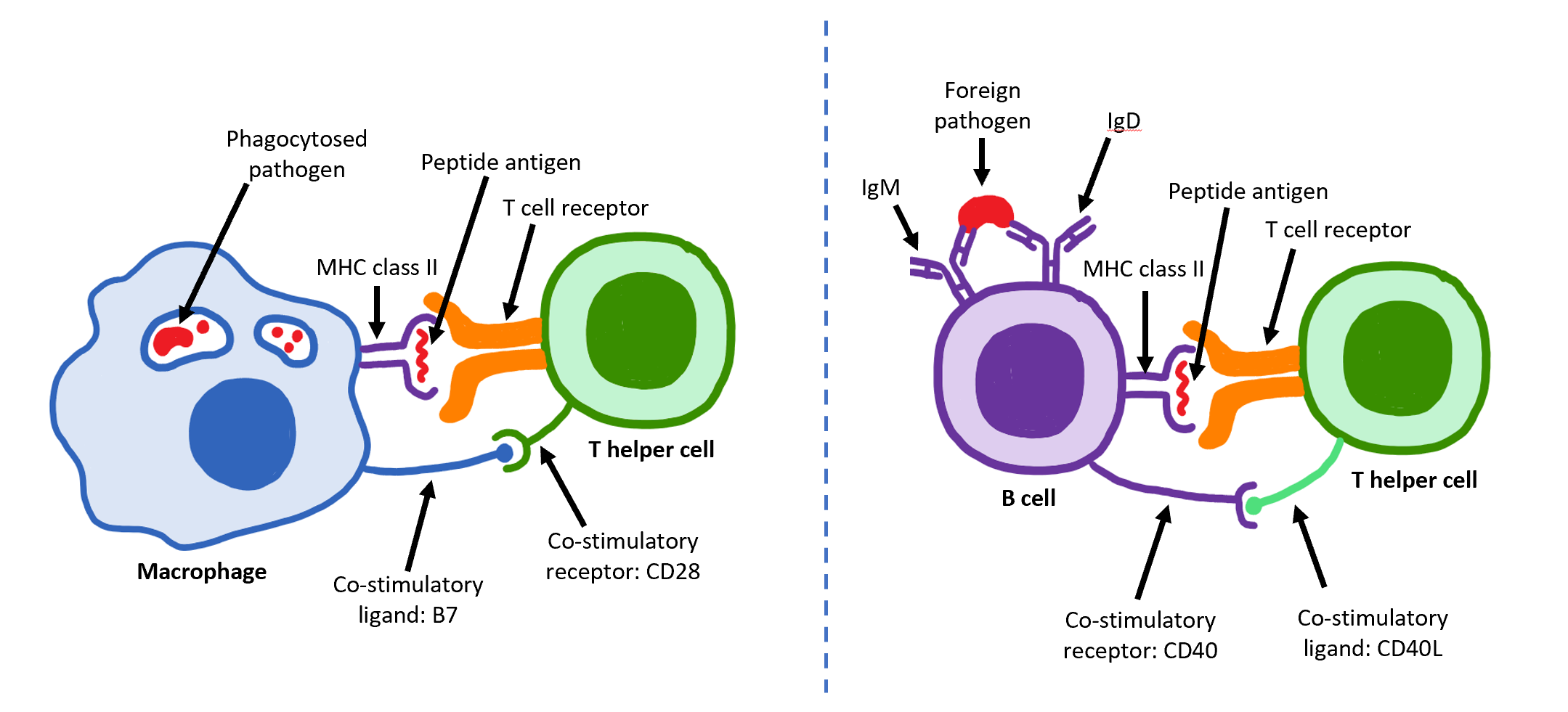
MHC peptide presentation along with co-stimulatory ligand/receptor binding

The adaptive immune response is the body's second line of defense. The cells of the adaptive immune system are extremely specific because during early developmental stages the B and T cells develop antigen receptors that are specific to only certain antigens. This is extremely important for B and T cell activation. B and T cells are extremely dangerous cells, and if they are able to attack without undergoing a rigorous process of activation, a faulty B or T cell can begin exterminating the host's own healthy cells. Activation of naïve helper T cells occurs when antigen-presenting cells (APCs) present foreign antigen via MHC class II molecules on their cell surface. These APCs include dendritic cells, B cells, and macrophages which are specially equipped not only with MHC class II but also with co-stimulatory ligands which are recognized by co-stimulatory receptors on helper T cells. Without the co-stimulatory molecules, the adaptive immune response would be inefficient and T cells would become anergic. Several T cell subgroups can be activated by specific APCs, and each T cell is specially equipped to deal with each unique microbial pathogen. The type of T cell activated and the type of response generated depends, in part, on the context in which the APC first encountered the antigen. Once helper T cells are activated, they are able to activate naïve B cells in the lymph node. However, B cell activation is a two-step process. Firstly, B cell receptors, which are just Immunoglobulin M (IgM) and Immunoglobulin D (IgD) antibodies specific to the particular B cell, must bind to the antigen which then results in internal processing so that it is presented on the MHC class II molecules of the B cell. Once this happens a T helper cell which is able to identify the antigen bound to the MHC interacts with its co-stimulatory molecule and activates the B cell. As a result, the B cell becomes a plasma cell which secretes antibodies that act as an opsonin against invaders.

Specificity in the adaptive branch is due to the fact that every B and T cell is different. Thus there is a diverse community of cells ready to recognize and attack a full range of invaders. The trade-off, however, is that the adaptive immune response is much slower than the body's innate response because its cells are extremely specific and activation is required before it is able to actually act. In addition to specificity, the adaptive immune response is also known for immunological memory. After encountering an antigen, the immune system produces memory T and B cells which allow for a speedier, more robust immune response in the case that the organism ever encounters the same antigen again.

== Types of immune response ==
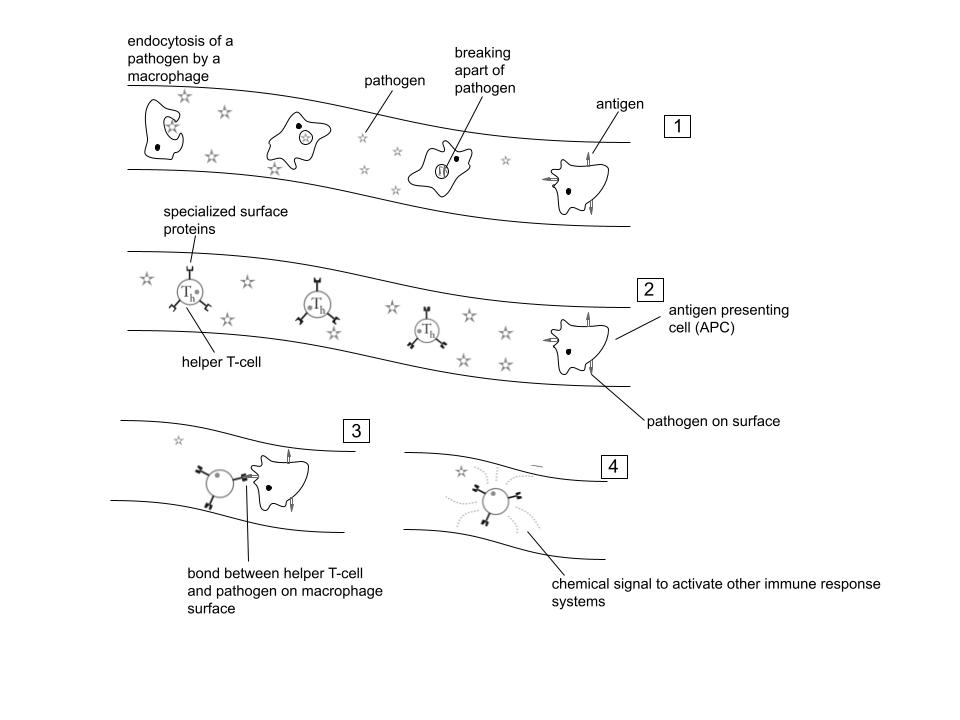

Depending on exogenous demands, several types of immune response (IR) are distinguished. In this paradigm, immune system (both innate and adaptive) and non-immune system cellular and molecular components are organized to optimally respond to distinct exposome challenges.

Currently, several types of IR are classified.

Type 1 IR is elicited by viruses, intracellular bacteria, parasites. The actors here are group 1 innate lymphoid cells (ILC1), NK cells, Th1 cells, macrophages, opsonizing IgG isotypes.

Type 2 IR is caused by toxins and multicellular parasites. ILC2, epithelial cells, Th2 lymphocytes, eosinophils, basophils, mast cells, IgE are key players here.

Type 3 IR targets extracellular bacteria and fungi by recruiting ILC3, Th17, neutrophils, opsonizing IgG isotypes.

Additional types of IR can be observed in noninfectious pathologies.

All types of IR have sensor (ILCs, NK cells), adaptive (T and B cells), and effector (neutrophils, eosinophils, basophils, mast cells) parts.
