= Map44 =

mannan-binding lectin serine peptidase 1 (C4/C2 activating component of Ra-reactive factor)

Identifiers
- Symbol: MASP1
- Alt. symbols: CRARF, PRSS5
- NCBI gene: 5648
- HGNC: 6901
- OMIM: 600521
- RefSeq: NM_001879
- UniProt: P48740

Other data
- Locus: Chr. 3 q27-q28
Search for
- Structures: Swiss-model
- Domains: InterPro

Mannose-binding lectin-associated protein of 44 kDa (MAp44) is a protein arising from the human MASP1 gene. MASP-1, MASP-3 and MAp44 are alternative splice products of the MASP1 gene. MAp44 has been suggested to act as a competitive inhibitor of lectin pathway activation, by displacing MASP-2 from MBL, hence preventing cleavage of C4 and C2

== See also ==
- mannan-binding lectin
- lectin pathway
