= FCN1 =

Protein-coding gene in the species Homo sapiens

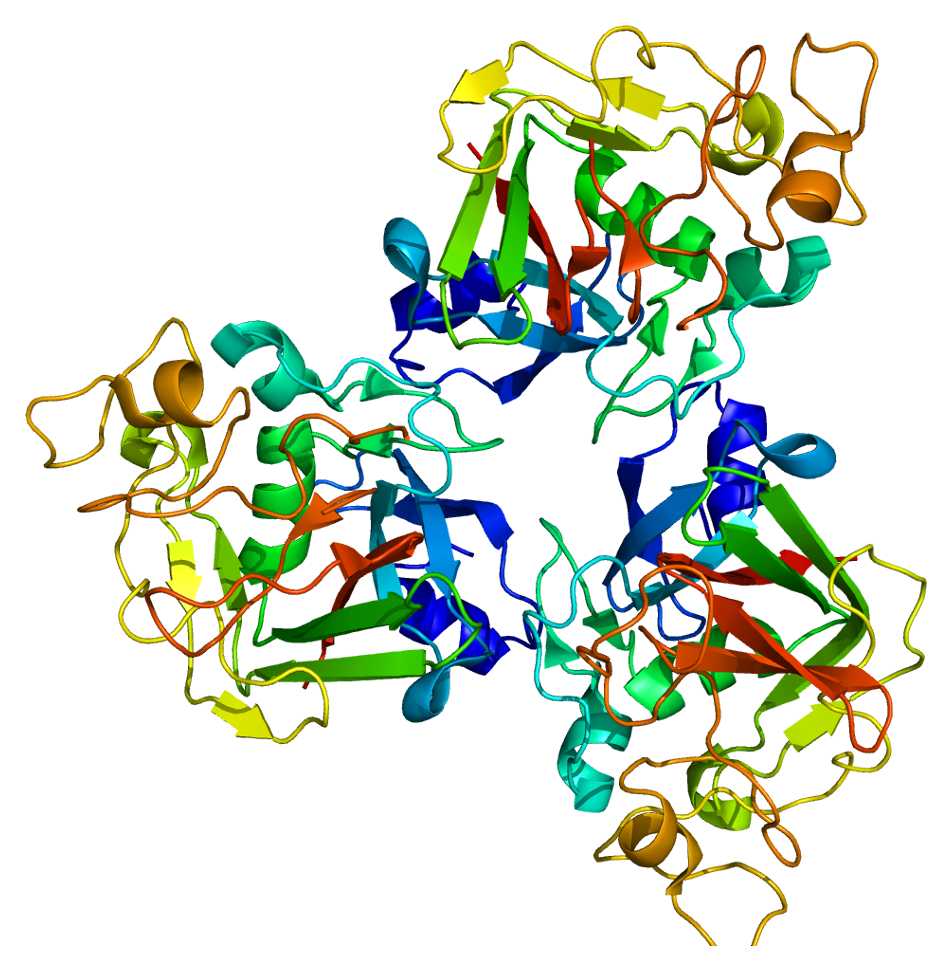

Identifiers
- Aliases: FCN1, FCNM, ficolin 1
- External IDs: OMIM: 601252; MGI: 1341158; GeneCards: FCN1
Available structures
PDB	Ortholog search: PDBe RCSB
PDB	List of PDB id codes 2D39, 2JHH, 2JHI, 2JHK, 2JHL, 2JHM, 2WNP

Gene location (Human)
Chr.	Chromosome 9 (human)
Band	9q34.3	Start	134,903,232 bp
Band	9q34.3	End	134,917,912 bp

Gene location (Mouse)
Chr.	Chromosome 2 (mouse)
Band	2|2 A3	Start	27,966,390 bp
Band	2|2 A3	End	27,974,897 bp
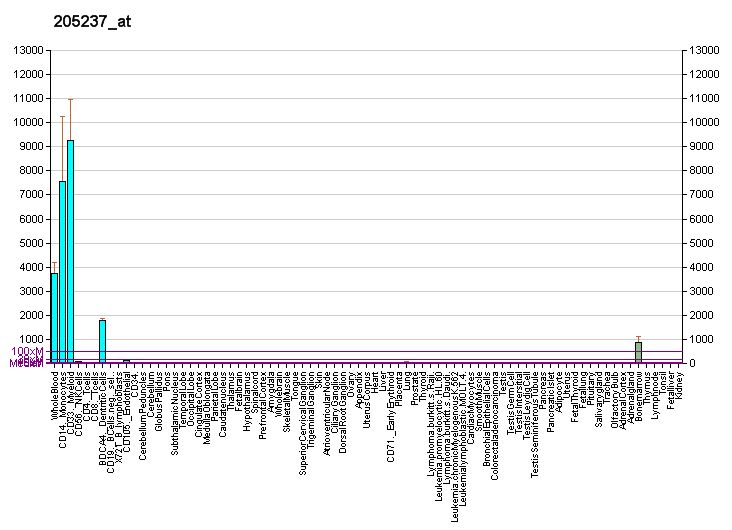
RNA expression pattern
Bgee	Human / Mouse (ortholog); Top expressed in: monocyte; granulocyte; trabecular bone; bone marrow; blood; bone marrow cell; buccal mucosa cell; appendix; spleen; periodontal fiber / Top expressed in: granulocyte; morula; bone marrow; body of femur; lumbar subsegment of spinal cord; cochlea; vestibular membrane of cochlear duct; spleen; triceps brachii muscle; submandibular gland; More reference expression data
BioGPS	More reference expression data
Gene ontology
Molecular function	sialic acid binding; protein binding; G protein-coupled receptor binding; metal ion binding; carbohydrate binding; pattern recognition receptor activity; serine-type endopeptidase activity; carbohydrate derivative binding
Cellular component	extracellular region; plasma membrane; collagen; extrinsic component of external side of plasma membrane; membrane; secretory granule lumen; ficolin-1-rich granule lumen; collagen-containing extracellular matrix
Biological process	complement activation, lectin pathway; complement activation; G protein-coupled receptor signaling pathway; recognition of apoptotic cell; protein localization to cell surface; cell surface pattern recognition receptor signaling pathway; immune system process; proteolysis; innate immune response; neutrophil degranulation
Sources:Amigo / QuickGO
Orthologs
Databases	NCBI: entry; OMA: entry
Species	Human	Mouse
Entrez	2219	14134
Ensembl	ENSG00000085265	ENSMUSG00000026835
UniProt	O00602	O70497
RefSeq (mRNA)	NM_002003	NM_010190
RefSeq (protein)	NP_001994	NP_034320
Location (UCSC)	Chr 9: 134.9 – 134.92 Mb	Chr 2: 27.97 – 27.97 Mb
PubMed search
- Wikidata
View/Edit Human	View/Edit Mouse

Ficolin-1, and also commonly termed M-ficolin is a protein that in humans is encoded by the FCN1 gene.

Proteins of the ficolin family consist of a leader peptide, a short N-terminal segment, followed by a collagen-like domain, and a C-terminal fibrinogen-like domain. The name of ficolin was derived from the latter two domains. The collagen-like and the fibrinogen-like domains are also found in other proteins such as tenascins, while the former is also found in complement protein C1q and collectins, which include mannose-binding lectin and lung surfactant proteins. Ficolins selectively recognize acetylated compounds. M-ficolin encoded by FCN1 is predominantly expressed in the peripheral blood leukocytes, and has been postulated to function as a plasma protein with elastin-binding activity. Several SNPs have been described in the FCN1 gene with impact on serum concentrations of M-ficolin and the ligand binding ability. M-ficolin levels reflect disease activity and predict remission in early rheumatoid arthritis.
