= Fibrinogen C domain containing 1 =

Protein-coding gene in the species Homo sapiens

FIBCD1

Identifiers
- Aliases: FIBCD1, fibrinogen C domain containing 1
- External IDs: OMIM: 613357; MGI: 2138953; GeneCards: FIBCD1
Available structures
PDB	Ortholog search: PDBe RCSB
PDB	List of PDB id codes 4M7F, 4M7H

Gene location (Mouse)
Chr.	Chromosome 2 (mouse)
Band	2|2 B	Start	31,703,302 bp
Band	2|2 B	End	31,736,017 bp
RNA expression pattern
Bgee	Human / Mouse (ortholog); Top expressed in: right ventricle; vena cava; oocyte; cerebellar vermis; body of tongue; hippocampus proper; trabecular bone; pons; pericardium; external globus pallidus / Top expressed in: hippocampus proper; Region I of hippocampus proper; subiculum; primary visual cortex; pharynx; habenula; dentate gyrus of hippocampal formation granule cell; superior colliculus; embryo; superior frontal gyrus; More reference expression data
BioGPS	n/a
Orthologs
Databases	NCBI: entry
Species	Human	Mouse
Entrez	84929	98970
Ensembl	n/a	ENSMUSG00000026841
UniProt	Q8N539	A2AV25
RefSeq (mRNA)	NM_032843; NM_001145106	NM_178887
RefSeq (protein)	NP_001138578; NP_116232	NP_849218
Location (UCSC)	n/a	Chr 2: 31.7 – 31.74 Mb
PubMed search
- Wikidata
View/Edit Human	View/Edit Mouse

Fibrinogen C domain containing 1 (FIBCD1) is a protein that in humans is encoded by the FIBCD1 gene localized on chromosome 9q34.1 in close proximity to the genes encoding L- and M-ficolin. FIBCD1 is thought to have a role in both host defence and gut homeostasis.

== Function ==
FIBCD1 is a type II trans-membrane endocytic receptor that is expressed apically on enterocytes and on airway epithelial cells (Schlosser et al., 2009). It is thought to mediate the endocytosis of bound ligands which are released to the surroundings after degradation, with FIBCD1 being recycled to the plasma membrane.

The homology between FIBCD1 and members of the ficolins, which are extensively characterised pattern-recognition molecules that have roles in the immune response, indicate FIBCD1 may have a role in host defence. Two potential phosphorylation sites in the cytoplasmic part of FIBCD1 suggest that FIBCD1 also may be a signaling protein (Schlosser et al., 2009).

== Structure ==
FIBCD1 forms homo-tetramers in the plasma membrane, with each protein chain consisting of a short cytoplasmic tail, a trans-membrane helix, and an ectodomain containing a coiled-coil region, a polycationic region, and a C-terminal fibrinogen-like recognition domain, otherwise known as the FReD. (Shrive, et al., 2014)
