= Serum amyloid A =

Family of proteins

Human Serum amyloid A1

Identifiers
- Symbol: SAA1
- NCBI gene: 6288
- HGNC: 10513
- OMIM: 104750
- RefSeq: NM_199161
- UniProt: P0DJI8

Other data
- Locus: Chr. 11 p15.1
Search for
- Structures: Swiss-model
- Domains: InterPro

Human Serum amyloid A2

Identifiers
- Symbol: SAA2
- NCBI gene: 6289
- HGNC: 10514
- OMIM: 104751
- RefSeq: NM_030754
- UniProt: P02735

Other data
- Locus: Chr. 11 p15.1-p14
Search for
- Structures: Swiss-model
- Domains: InterPro

Human Serum amyloid A3, pseudogene

Identifiers
- Symbol: SAA3P
- Alt. symbols: SAA3
- NCBI gene: 6290
- HGNC: 10515
- UniProt: P22614

Other data
- Locus: Chr. 11 p15.1-p14
Search for
- Structures: Swiss-model
- Domains: InterPro

Human Serum amyloid A4

Identifiers
- Symbol: SAA4
- Alt. symbols: C-SAA
- NCBI gene: 6291
- HGNC: 10516
- OMIM: 104752
- RefSeq: NM_006512
- UniProt: P35542

Other data
- Locus: Chr. 11 p15.1-p14
Search for
- Structures: Swiss-model
- Domains: InterPro

Serum amyloid A (SAA) proteins are a family of apolipoproteins associated with high-density lipoprotein (HDL) in plasma. Different isoforms of SAA are expressed constitutively (constitutive SAAs) at different levels or in response to inflammatory stimuli (acute phase SAAs). These proteins are produced predominantly by the liver.

== Acute-phase serum amyloid A proteins ==
Acute-phase serum amyloid A proteins (A-SAAs) are secreted during the acute phase of inflammation. These proteins have several roles, including the transport of cholesterol to the liver for secretion into the bile, the recruitment of immune cells to inflammatory sites, and the induction of enzymes that degrade extracellular matrix. A-SAAs are implicated in several chronic inflammatory diseases, such as amyloidosis, atherosclerosis, and rheumatoid arthritis. Three acute-phase SAA isoforms have been reported in mice, called SAA1, SAA2, and SAA3. During inflammation, SAA1 and SAA2 are expressed and induced principally in the liver, whereas SAA3 is induced in many distinct tissues. SAA1 and SAA2 genes are regulated in liver cells by the proinflammatory cytokines IL-1, IL-6, and TNF-α. Both SAA1 and SAA2 are induced up to a 1000-fold in mice under acute inflammatory conditions following exposure to bacterial lipopolysaccharide (LPS). Three A-SAA genes have also been identified in humans, although the third gene, SAA3, is believed to represent a pseudogene that does not generate messenger RNA or protein. Molecular weights of the human proteins are estimated at 11.7 kDa for SAA1 and 14.8 kDa for SAA4.

Serum amyloid A (SAA) is also an acute phase marker that responds rapidly. Similar to CRP, levels of acute-phase SAA increase within hours after inflammatory stimulus, and the magnitude of increase may be greater than that of CRP. Relatively trivial inflammatory stimuli can lead to SAA responses. It has been suggested that SAA levels correlate better with disease activity in early inflammatory joint disease than do ESR and CRP. Although largely produced by hepatocytes, more recent studies show that SAA is produced by adipocytes as well, and its serum concentration is associated with body mass index.

== Constitutive serum amyloid A proteins ==
A fourth SAA (SAA4) was identified in humans and is expressed constitutively in the liver and, thus, is defined as a constitutive SAA (C-SAA). A similar protein that is now also called SAA4 has since been identified in the mouse; it had originally been designated SAA5.

== See also ==
- Serum amyloid A-like 1 (symbol SAAL1)
