= Acute-phase protein =

Class of proteins involved in inflammation

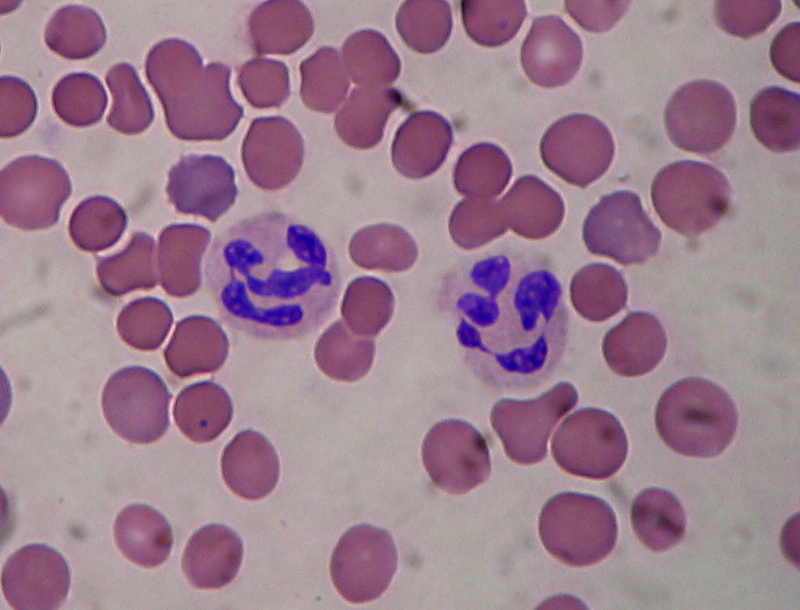
Inflammatory cells and red blood cells

Acute-phase proteins (APPs) are a class of proteins whose concentrations in blood plasma either increase (positive acute-phase proteins) or decrease (negative acute-phase proteins) considerably - in respect to other counterparts - in response to inflammation. This response is called the acute-phase reaction (also called acute-phase response). The acute-phase reaction characteristically involves fever, acceleration of peripheral leukocytes, circulating neutrophils and their precursors. The terms acute-phase protein and acute-phase reactant (APR) are often used synonymously, although some APRs are (strictly speaking) polypeptides rather than proteins.

In response to injury, local inflammatory cells (neutrophil granulocytes and macrophages) secrete a number of cytokines into the bloodstream, most notable of which are the interleukins IL1, and IL6, and TNF-α. The liver responds by producing many acute-phase reactants. At the same time, the production of a number of other proteins is reduced; these proteins are, therefore, referred to as "negative" acute-phase reactants. Increased acute-phase proteins from the liver may also contribute to the promotion of sepsis.

== Regulation of synthesis ==
TNF-α, IL-1β and IFN-γ are important for the expression of inflammatory mediators such as prostaglandins and leukotrienes, and they also cause the production of platelet-activating factor and IL-6. After stimulation with proinflammatory cytokines, Kupffer cells produce IL-6 in the liver and present it to the hepatocytes. IL-6 is the major mediator for the hepatocytic secretion of APPs. Synthesis of APP can also be regulated indirectly by cortisol. Cortisol can enhance expression of IL-6 receptors in liver cells and induce IL-6-mediated production of APPs.

== Positive ==
Positive acute-phase proteins serve (as part of the innate immune system) different physiological functions within the immune system. Some act to destroy or inhibit growth of microbes, e.g., C-reactive protein, mannose-binding protein, complement factors, ferritin, ceruloplasmin, serum amyloid A and haptoglobin. Others give negative feedback on the inflammatory response, e.g. serpins. Alpha 2-macroglobulin and coagulation factors affect coagulation, mainly stimulating it. This pro-coagulant effect may limit infection by trapping pathogens in local blood clots. Also, some products of the coagulation system can contribute to the innate immune system by their ability to increase vascular permeability and act as chemotactic agents for phagocytic cells.

"Positive" acute-phase proteins:
Protein	Immune system function
C-reactive protein	Opsonin on microbes (not an acute-phase reactant in mice)
Serum amyloid P component	Opsonin
Serum amyloid A	Recruitment of immune cells to inflammatory sites; Induction of enzymes that degrade extracellular matrix
Complement factors	Opsonization, lysis and clumping of target cells. Chemotaxis
Mannan-binding lectin	Mannan-binding lectin pathway of complement activation
Fibrinogen, prothrombin, factor VIII, von Willebrand factor	Coagulation factors, trapping invading microbes in blood clots. Some cause chemotaxis
Plasminogen activator inhibitor-1 (PAI-1)	Prevents the degradation of blood clots by inhibiting tissue Plasminogen Activator (tPA)
Alpha 2-macroglobulin	Inhibitor of coagulation by inhibiting thrombin.; Inhibitor of fibrinolysis by inhibiting plasmin
Ferritin	Binding iron, inhibiting microbe iron uptake
Hepcidin	Stimulates the internalization of ferroportin, preventing release of iron bound by ferritin within intestinal enterocytes and macrophages
Ceruloplasmin	Oxidizes iron, facilitating for ferritin, inhibiting microbe iron uptake
Haptoglobin	Binds hemoglobin, inhibiting microbe iron uptake and prevents kidney damage
Orosomucoid (Alpha-1-acid glycoprotein, AGP)	Steroid carrier
Alpha 1-antitrypsin	Serpin, downregulates inflammation
Alpha 1-antichymotrypsin	Serpin, downregulates inflammation
Lipopolysaccharide binding protein (LBP)	Attaches to bacterial LPS, evoke immune responses via pattern recognition receptors

== Negative ==
"Negative" acute-phase proteins decrease in inflammation. Examples include albumin, transferrin, transthyretin, retinol-binding protein, antithrombin, transcortin. The decrease of such proteins may be used as markers of inflammation. The physiological role of decreased synthesis of such proteins is generally to save amino acids for producing "positive" acute-phase proteins more efficiently. Theoretically, a decrease in transferrin could additionally be decreased by an upregulation of transferrin receptors, but the latter does not appear to change with inflammation.

While the production of C3 (a complement factor) increases in the liver, the plasma concentration often lowers because of an increased turn-over, therefore it is often seen as a negative acute-phase protein.

== Clinical significance ==
Measurement of acute-phase proteins, especially C-reactive protein, is a useful marker of inflammation in both medical and veterinary clinical pathology. It correlates with the erythrocyte sedimentation rate (ESR), however not always directly. This is due to the ESR being largely dependent on the elevation of fibrinogen, an acute phase reactant with a half-life of approximately one week. This protein will therefore remain higher for longer despite the removal of the inflammatory stimuli. In contrast, C-reactive protein (with a half-life of 6–8 hours) rises rapidly and can quickly return to within the normal range if treatment is employed. For example, in active systemic lupus erythematosus, one may find a raised ESR but normal C-reactive protein.They may also indicate liver failure.
