= SAAL1 =

Protein-coding gene in the species Homo sapiens

Identifiers
- Aliases: SAAL1, SPACIA1, serum amyloid A like 1
- External IDs: MGI: 1926185; GeneCards: SAAL1

Gene location (Human)
Chr.	Chromosome 11 (human)
Band	11p15.1	Start	18,069,935 bp
Band	11p15.1	End	18,106,087 bp

Gene location (Mouse)
Chr.	Chromosome 7 (mouse)
Band	7|7 B3	Start	46,335,532 bp
Band	7|7 B3	End	46,360,104 bp
RNA expression pattern
Bgee	Human / Mouse (ortholog); Top expressed in: gonad; ganglionic eminence; ventricular zone; mucosa of ileum; testicle; tibialis anterior muscle; cerebellar hemisphere; right hemisphere of cerebellum; Achilles tendon; left ovary / Top expressed in: Ileal epithelium; maxillary prominence; mandibular prominence; gastrula; medial ganglionic eminence; epiblast; tail of embryo; otic placode; saccule; abdominal wall; More reference expression data
BioGPS	n/a
Orthologs
Databases	NCBI: entry; OMA: entry
Species	Human	Mouse
Entrez	113174	78935
Ensembl	ENSG00000166788	ENSMUSG00000006763
UniProt	Q96ER3	Q9D2C2
RefSeq (mRNA)	NM_138421	NM_030233
RefSeq (protein)	NP_612430	NP_084509
Location (UCSC)	Chr 11: 18.07 – 18.11 Mb	Chr 7: 46.34 – 46.36 Mb
PubMed search
- Wikidata
View/Edit Human	View/Edit Mouse

Serum amyloid A-like 1 (also known as SAAL1, Synoviocyte proliferation-associated in collagen-induced arthritis 1, and SPACIA1) is a protein in humans encoded by the SAAL1 gene.

== Gene ==
=== Locus ===
The human SAAL1 gene is located at position 11p15.1 on the minus strand spanning from base pairs 18080292-18106082 (25,790 bases). It has 12 exons and 11 introns and encodes a single isoform.

Members of the serum amyloid-A family such as SAA1 reside in the same loci as SAAL1.

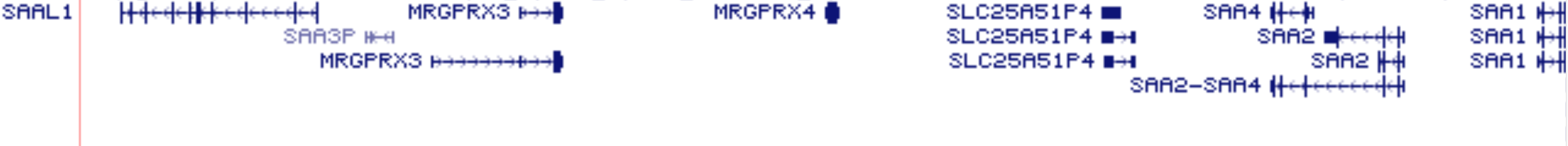
SAAL1 gene neighborhood at loci 11p15.1

=== Promoter ===
The promoter region (GXP_169676) is predicted to span from basepairs 18105980-18107207 and extends into the first exon of SAAL1. Predicted transcription factors include TATA binding factors, NF-κB, and KLF4, KLF5, and KLF6.

=== Expression ===
SAAL1 is ubiquitously expressed at moderate levels across all human tissues with highest expression in testes as determined by RNA-sequencing and microarray expression profiling.

== Transcript ==
Predicted 5' UTR binding proteins of the human SAAL1 transcript include SRSF3 and FXR2. Predicted 3' UTR binding proteins include SRSF5 and U2AF2. All predicted proteins are involved in mRNA splicing, export, and translation.

SAAL1 mRNA sequence and translated amino acid sequence. Exon boundaries, start and stop codons, motifs, and post-translational modifications are annotated. Well conserved base pairs and amino acids are bolded

== Protein structure ==
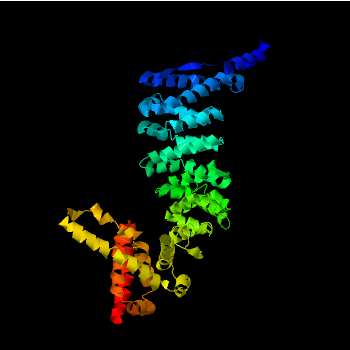
I-TASSER generated model of SAAL1 tertiary structure. The N-terminus is blue and C-terminus is red.

=== General properties ===
The SAAL1 protein has a single known isoform consisting of 474 amino acids with a molecular weight of 53.5 kDa. The unmodified SAAL1 protein is acidic with an isoelectric point of 4.4.

=== Composition ===
SAAL1 is abundant in aspartic acid (7.8% by composition) and deficient in glycine (3.4% by composition)compared to other human proteins. It also has 44 more aspartic acid and glutamic acid residues compared to lysine and arginine, indicating an overall negative charge. Two negatively charged and glutamic acid abundant segments were identified and labeled in the SAAL1 conceptual translation.

=== Domains and motifs ===
SAAL1 contains an armadillo-like fold with an enveloped fungal symportin-1 like region. Other motifs were predicted by ELM and MyHits Motif Scan.

Predicted Motifs
Predicted Motifs	Amino Acids	Tools
Casein kinase 2 phosphorylation site	152-155, 165-168	MyHits, ELM
Nuclear Export Signal	72-84	ELM
MAPK docking site	106-115, 344-352	ELM

=== Sub-cellular localization ===
Immunofluorescent staining has identified SAAL1 localization in the nucleus of Caco-2 cells. However, western blotting of hepatocellular carcinoma cell lines identified SAAL1 localization in the cytoplasm with minor amounts in the cell membrane and nucleus.

=== Post-translational modifications ===
SAAL1 undergoes phosphorylation at two experimentally verified sites: Ser6 and Thr387. Predicted post-translational modifications are detailed in the following table.

Predicted Post-Translational Modifications
Tool	Predicted Modification	Amino Acids
NetPhos	Casein kinase 2 phosphorylation	Thr152, Ser165
YinOYang	O-linked glycosylation	Ser6
SMART	Ubiquitination	Lys209, Val302

== Clinical significance ==
SAAL1 overexpression has been correlated with the proliferation of rheumatoid and osteoarthritic synovial fibroblasts as well as disease progression. RNAi knockouts of SAAL1 reduced arrested fibroblasts in G_{0}/G_{1} phase and reduced proliferation by 20% with a 50% reduction when fibroblasts were stimulated by TNF-α. Stability assays reveal that SAAL1 promotes G1/S transition via CDK6 mRNA stabilization. This finding was corroborated by SAAL1 knockdowns in hepatocellular carcinomas which also demonstrated impaired HGF-induced migration and increased sensitivity to sorafenib and foretinib treatment. Additionally, SAAL1 is overexpressed in hepatocellular carcinoma cells and in chondrocytes stimulated by interleukin-1 beta, but this effect is diminished in the presence of glucosamine.

Studies of the rock bream SAAL1 ortholog noted an increase in gene expression in response to bacterial and viral pathogens. Human SAAL1 has been reported to interact with the M protein of SARS-Cov-2, Orf4 of Kaposi's sarcoma-associated herpesvirus, and the M and M2 proteins of influenza A. It has also been reported as an interferon stimulator and TRIM25 interactor. Other interacting proteins include PNKD (which plays a role in cardiac hypertrophy via NF-κB signaling), TMIGD3(which inhibits NF-κB activity), and MARK3.

== Evolution ==
=== Homology ===
Three page PDF of multiple sequence alignment of vertebrate SAAL1 orthologs referenced in the orthologs table.

BLAST searches have found homologs for SAAL1 in organisms as distant as plants, though few orthologs were found for fungi. The following table provides a sample of the ortholog space. Vertebrate orthologs share >50% identity with human protein SAAL1 while displayed invertebrates and non-metazoan orthologs have 30% or less identity.

Sample of SAAL1 Orthologs
Species	Organism Common Name	Multiple Sequence Alignment Abbreviation	Date of Divergence from Humans (Millions of Years Ago)	Length (AAs)	Identity	NCBI Accession
Homo sapiens	Humans	Hsa_SAAL1	0	474	100	NP_612430.2
Macaca mulatta	Rhesus Monkey	Mmu_SAAL1	29	473	98	XP_001087433.2
Ictidomys tridecemlineatus	Thirteen-Lined Ground Squirrel	Itr_SAAL1	90	474	90	XP_005326805.1
Monodelphis domestica	Gray Short-Tailed Opossum	Mdo_SAAL1	159	475	73	XP_007497074.1
Ornithorhynchus anatinus	Platypus	Oan_SAAL1	177	486	71	XP_028915648.1
Calidris pugnax	Ruff	Cpu_SAAL1	312	472	70	XP_014815565.1
Rhinatrema bivittatum	Two-Lined Caecilian	Rbi_SAAL1	352	472	61	XP_029438391.1
Erpetoichthys calabaricus	Reedfish	Eca_SAAL1	435	484	50	XP_028650019.1
Callorhinchus milii	Australian Ghost Shark	Cmi_SAAL1	473	474	54	XP_007885592.1
Saccoglossus kowalevskii	Acorn Worm	Ski_SAAL1	684	508	28	XP_002732678.2
Pomacea canaliculata	Golden Apple Snail	Pca_SAAL1	797	563	30	XP_025086883.1
Orbicella faveolata	Mountainous Star Coral	Ofa_SAAL1	824	561	25	XP_020625180.1
Rhizopus microsporus	(a fungal plant pathogen)	Rmi_SAAL1	1105	323	14	XP_023467779.1
Phycomyces blakesleeanus	(a type of fungus)	Pbl_SAAL1	1105	346	14	XP_018285622.1
Manihot esculenta	Cassava	Mes_SAAL1	1496	536	20	XP_021611223.1
Lactuca sativa	Lettuce	Lsa_SAAL1	1496	534	19	XP_023753062.1
Lupinus angustifolius	Narrowleaf Lupin	Lan_SAAL1	1496	488	18	XP_019436310.1
Elaeis guineensis	Oil Palm	Egu_SAAL1	1496	568	18	XP_010933466.1
Phalaenopsis equestris	(a type of orchid)	Peq_SAAL1	1496	551	17	XP_020591929.1
Phoenix dactylifera	Date Palm	Pda_SAAL1	1496	508	17	XP_026661658.1

SAAL1 exists in up to four isoforms in other vertebrates. Across these orthologs, it is the only member of its gene family.

Two page PDF of multiple sequence alignment of invertebrate and non-metazoan SAAL1 orthologs in the table, excluding the fungi orthologs. Poorly aligned regions are not shown.

A multiple sequence alignment of the vertebrate homologs demonstrated high conservation of the protein, especially in the armadillo-type fold and fungal symportin-1 like motif. An alignment of invertebrate and non-metazoan orthologs indicates drastic changes in the protein's primary structure, but some conservation in the labeled motifs. Highly similar amino acids were colored red and less similar amino acids were colored blue; "*" denotes conservation and "." denotes similarity.

=== Phylogeny ===
The date of divergence from the human ortholog was compared to the corrected % divergence for SAAL1 orthologs. Compared against data for cytochrome c and fibrinogen alpha proteins in similar orthologs, SAAL1 evolved at a moderate rate.

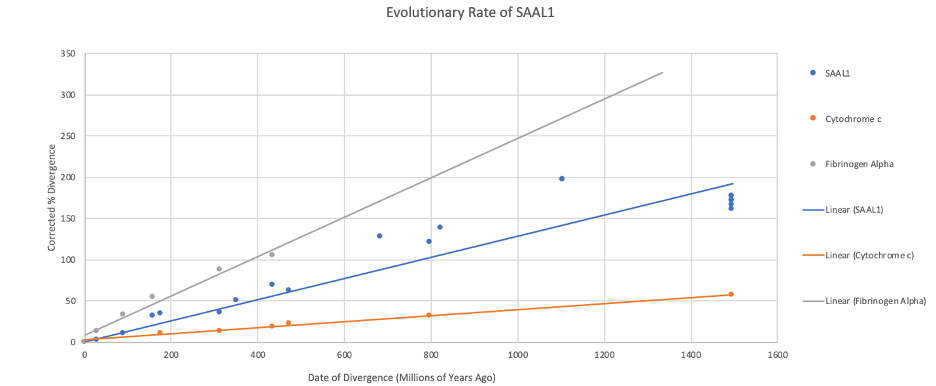
SAAL1 evolutionary rate vs fibrinogen alpha and cytochrome c.
