= FCN2 =

Protein-coding gene in the species Homo sapiens

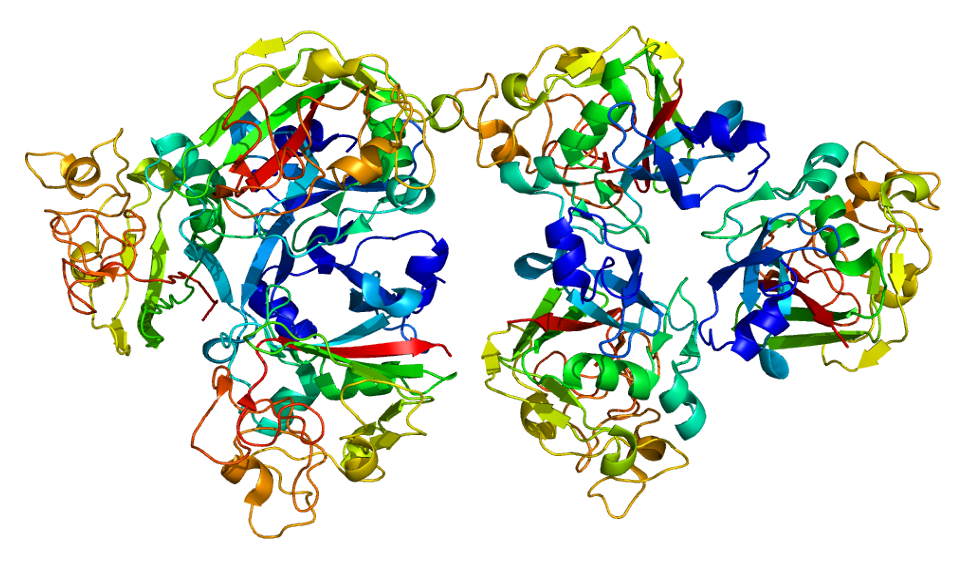

Identifiers
- Aliases: FCN2, EBP-37, FCNL, P35, ficolin-2, ficolin 2
- External IDs: OMIM: 601624; GeneCards: FCN2
Available structures
PDB	Human UniProt search: PDBe RCSB
PDB	List of PDB id codes 2J0G, 2J0H, 2J0Y, 2J1G, 2J2P, 2J3F, 2J3G, 2J3O, 2J3U, 2J61, 4NYT, 4R9J, 4R9T
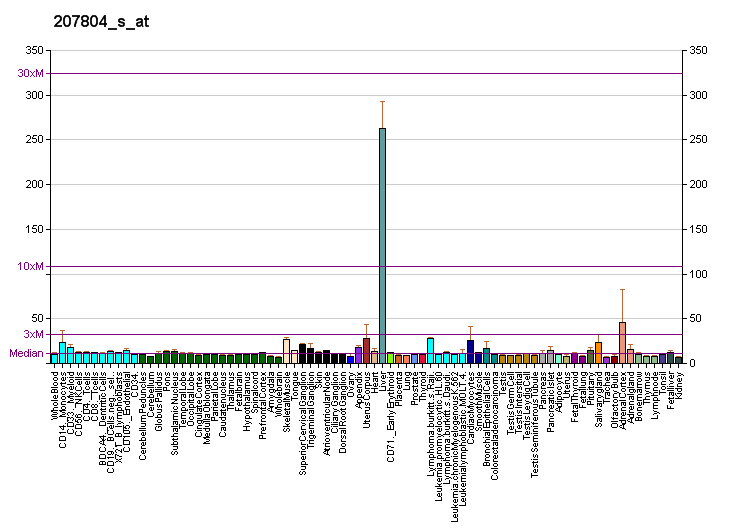
RNA expression pattern
Bgee	Human / Mouse (ortholog); Top expressed in: right lobe of liver; spleen; pituitary gland; subcutaneous adipose tissue; prostate; right lobe of thyroid gland; kidney; anterior pituitary; minor salivary glands; left lobe of thyroid gland / n/a; More reference expression data
BioGPS	More reference expression data
Gene ontology
Molecular function	antigen binding; protein binding; mannan binding; metal ion binding; calcium-dependent protein binding; carbohydrate binding; proteoglycan binding; serine-type endopeptidase activity
Cellular component	extracellular region; collagen; blood microparticle; extracellular exosome
Biological process	immune system process; complement activation, lectin pathway; complement activation; recognition of apoptotic cell; opsonization; defense response to Gram-positive bacterium; innate immune response; proteolysis
Sources:Amigo / QuickGO
Orthologs
Databases	NCBI: entry
Species	Human	Mouse
Entrez	2220	n/a
Ensembl	n/a	n/a
UniProt	Q15485	n/a
RefSeq (mRNA)	NM_004108; NM_015837; NM_015838; NM_015839	n/a
RefSeq (protein)	NP_004099; NP_056652	n/a
Location (UCSC)	n/a	n/a
PubMed search		n/a
- Wikidata
View/Edit Human

Ficolin-2, which was initially identified as L-ficolin, is a protein that in humans is encoded by the FCN2 gene.

The product of this gene belongs to the ficolin family of proteins. This family is characterized by the presence of a leader peptide, a short N-terminal segment, followed by a collagen-like region, and a C-terminal fibrinogen-like domain. This gene is predominantly expressed in the liver, and has been shown to have carbohydrate binding and opsonic activities. Alternatively spliced transcript variants encoding different isoforms have been identified.
