= Serum amyloid A1 =

Protein-coding gene in the species Homo sapiens

SAA1

Identifiers
- Aliases: SAA1, PIG4, SAA, SAA2, TP53I4, Serum amyloid A1
- External IDs: OMIM: 104750; MGI: 98222; GeneCards: SAA1
Available structures
PDB	Ortholog search: PDBe RCSB
PDB	List of PDB id codes 4IP8, 4IP9

Gene location (Human)
Chr.	Chromosome 11 (human)
Band	11p15.1	Start	18,266,260 bp
Band	11p15.1	End	18,269,977 bp

Gene location (Mouse)
Chr.	Chromosome 7 (mouse)
Band	7 B3|7 30.56 cM	Start	46,401,214 bp
Band	7 B3|7 30.56 cM	End	46,403,737 bp
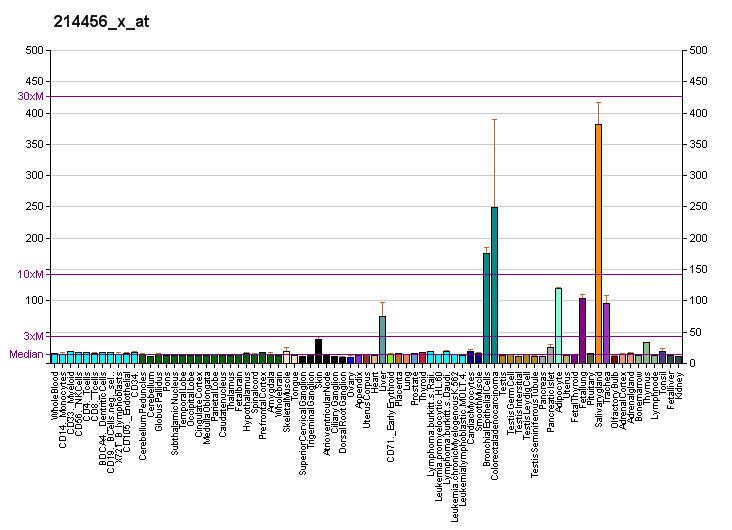

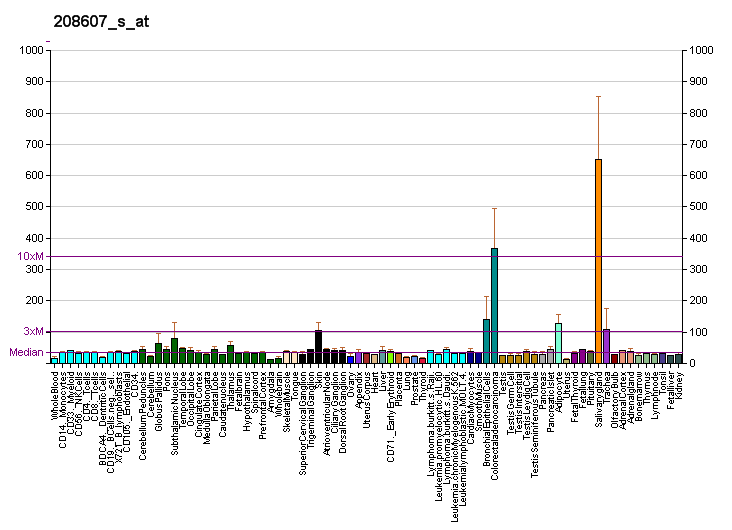
RNA expression pattern
Bgee	Human / Mouse (ortholog); Top expressed in: right lobe of liver; olfactory zone of nasal mucosa; lactiferous gland; salivary gland; minor salivary glands; right lung; gonad; subcutaneous adipose tissue; left coronary artery; right adrenal gland / Top expressed in: left lobe of liver; left colon; internal carotid artery; morula; embryo; intestinal villus; ileum; jejunum; seminal vesicula; yolk sac; More reference expression data
BioGPS	More reference expression data
Gene ontology
Molecular function	heparin binding; chemoattractant activity; G protein-coupled receptor binding
Cellular component	endocytic vesicle lumen; extracellular region; high-density lipoprotein particle; cytoplasmic microtubule; extracellular exosome; extracellular space
Biological process	positive regulation of cytosolic calcium ion concentration; receptor-mediated endocytosis; neutrophil chemotaxis; platelet activation; macrophage chemotaxis; acute-phase response; lymphocyte chemotaxis; innate immune response; negative regulation of inflammatory response; positive regulation of cell adhesion; regulation of protein secretion; positive chemotaxis; G protein-coupled receptor signaling pathway; cytokine-mediated signaling pathway; cell chemotaxis
Sources:Amigo / QuickGO
Orthologs
Databases	NCBI: entry; OMA: entry
Species	Human	Mouse
Entrez	6288	20209
Ensembl	ENSG00000173432; ENSG00000288411	ENSMUSG00000057465
UniProt	P0DJI8	P05367
RefSeq (mRNA)	NM_199161; NM_000331; NM_001178006	NM_011314; NM_001357491; NM_001379268; NM_001379269
RefSeq (protein)	NP_000322; NP_001171477; NP_954630	NP_035444; NP_001344420; NP_001366197; NP_001366198
Location (UCSC)	Chr 11: 18.27 – 18.27 Mb	Chr 7: 46.4 – 46.4 Mb
PubMed search
- Wikidata
View/Edit Human	View/Edit Mouse

Serum amyloid A1 (SAA1) is a protein that in humans is encoded by the SAA1 gene. SAA1 is a major acute-phase protein mainly produced by hepatocytes in response to infection, tissue injury and malignancy. When released into blood circulation, SAA1 is present as an apolipoprotein associated with high-density lipoprotein (HDL). SAA1 is a major precursor of amyloid A (AA), the deposit of which leads to inflammatory amyloidosis.

== Gene ==
The gene coding for human SAA1 is one of the 4 SAA genes mapped to a region in the short arm on Chromosome 11. Two of these genes, SAA1 and SAA2, are inducible during acute-phase response, whereas SAA3 is a pseudogene in humans and SAA4 is constitutively expressed in a variety of tissues and cells. Single nucleotide polymorphisms (SNPs) are found in SAA1 in both coding and non-coding sequences, with those located in the coding sequence defining 5 isoforms of SAA1 (SAA1.1 – 1.5). Genetic studies have shown association of some of these SNPs with the disposition to several human diseases including familial Mediterranean fever, coronary artery diseases, cerebral infarction, and osteoporosis. Mice also have 4 Saa genes. A major difference between human and mouse SAA genes is the expression of the mouse Saa3 gene for a functional protein, generally considered an inducible SAA in inflammatory tissues.

== Protein structure ==
The product of human SAA1 is a pre-protein of 122 amino acids, with a cleavable signal peptide of 18 amino acids. Mature SAA1 consists of 104 amino acids with an apparent molecular weight of 12,500. A crystal structure of SAA1.1 has been solved recently (Figure 1). Native SAA1 is a hexamer with each subunit assuming an antiparallel 4-helix bundle structure. The structure is cone-shaped with its apex forming a binding site for HDL and heparin. The N-terminal helices 1 and 3 have been identified as amyloidogenic peptides of SAA1.1, that are not presence on protein surface in native SAA1 protein. These findings provide the structural basis for the formation of amyloid A fibrils. The human SAA1.1 is comparable at the subunit level with the recently solved structure of mouse Saa3.

== Inducible expression ==
SAA1 and SAA2 are highly inducible and hence called acute-phase SAA. Inflammatory cytokines such as IL-1β, IL-6 and TNF-α are major stimulants for hepatocyte expression of the SAA1 gene. Inducible expression of the acute-phase SAA genes is mainly regulated at the transcription level and involves the transcription factors C/EBP, NF-κB, AP2, SAF, Sp1 and STAT3. Elevation of the transcript of SAA1 is often seen in cDNA arrays used for detection of proinflammatory cytokine expression. SAA1 protein level correlates with its transcript level, and has long been considered a clinical indicator for inflammatory conditions.

== Interactions ==
In addition to its association with HDL, SAA1 interacts with a number of mammalian proteins, mostly cell surface proteins such as receptors. SAA1 binding to the αvβ3 integrin produces an inhibitory effect on the growth of nasopharyngeal carcinoma. Several receptors for SAA1 have been identified using an SAA1 hybrid protein containing two amino acid substitutions from SAA2. These receptors include the G protein-coupled chemoattractant receptor formyl peptide receptor 2 (FPR2), believed to mediate the chemotactic activity of the recombinant SAA1; the murine scavenger receptor SR-BI and the human equivalent CLA-1., for a possible role in SAA1-dependent cholesterol metabolism. Moreover, the Toll-like receptors TLR2 and TLR4 mediate SAA1-induced cytokine gene expression. The P2X7 purinergic receptor is another receptor used by SAA1 for a number of cellular functions including the activation of NLRP3 inflammasomes.

SAA1 has been found to interact with outer membrane protein A (ompA) of several Gram-negative bacteria including E. coli, Salmonella typhimurium, Shigella flexneri, Vibrio cholerae and Pseudomonas aeruginosa. Exposure of these Gram-negative bacteria to SAA1 promotes uptake of the bacteria by neutrophils, suggesting that SAA1 serves as an opsonin that enhances bacteria clearance. A more recent study identified SAA1 interaction with retinol, resulting in reduced bacterial burden. These findings suggest that SAA1 has a function in host defense against bacterial infection.

== Functions and clinical relevance ==
The biological function of SAA1 has not been fully understood despite intensive research in the last three decades. Research tools such as the SAA1 knockout mice and transgenic mice have become available only recently. It has been well established, however, that elevated plasma concentration of SAA1 is associated with a multitude of inflammatory conditions. As a result, SAA1 has been a clinical indicator and reliable biomarker for inflammatory diseases, chronic metabolic disorders and late-stage malignancy. Inflammatory amyloidosis results from chronic inflammation with increased production of SAA1, which is a major precursor of amyloid A fibril deposit in various tissues.

SAA1 has been extensively studied for its binding to HDL, with results suggesting a role in lipid metabolism. During the acute-phase response, elevated levels of SAA1 in the plasma displaces ApoA-I and becomes a major apolipoprotein of HDL. The exact biological consequence of HDL remodeling by SAA1 is still under investigation, using recently developed tools such as the Saa1 and Saa2 knockout mice. SAA1 is also believed to contribute to the development of atherosclerosis. However, in an ApoE-deficient mouse model, deletion of the Saa1/Saa2 genes does not appear to affect atherosclerotic lesions.

Ex vivo and in vitro studies have shown that the recombinant human SAA1 hybrid protein has strong chemotactic activity for neutrophils and macrophages. This effect is believed to be mediated through FPR2, a G protein-coupled chemoattractant receptor. The same receptor also mediates the cytokine-like activity of the recombinant SAA1, resulting in an elevated expression of IL-8 in neutrophils. The recombinant SAA1 has been reported to induce the expression of a variety of inflammatory cytokines including IL-1β, TNF-α, IL-6, IL-12p40, as well as immunoregulatory cytokines such as IL-23, IL-33 and growth-stimulatory cytokines such as granulocyte colony stimulating factor (G-CSF).

SAA1 may also be produced by macrophages and epithelial cells in various tissues. It has been shown to promote local Th17 response in the gut. This finding, which is based on both Saa1/Saa2 knockout mice and ex vivo studies of T cells, strongly suggest a local immunomodulatory function of SAA1 as opposed to its established role as an acute-phase protein produced in the liver and present in the plasma as an apolipoprotein of HDL. Transgenic expression of human SAA1.1 in mouse liver aggravates T cell-mediated hepatitis through elevated production of chemokines, which involves the SAA1 receptor TLR2. Secretion of SAA1 by melanoma cells may induce anti-inflammatory IL-10-secreting neutrophils that interact with invariant natural killer T cells (iNKT cells). In addition, SAA1 can skew macrophages to a M2 phenotype.

Published reports link SAA1 to a number of malignancies, but a causal relationship has not been established. SAA1 has been associated with tumor pathogenesis, and its gene polymorphism is a contributing factor to certain types of malignant tumors. SAA1 has also been shown to affect the tumor microenvironment and contribute to tumor cell metastasis.

Some of the results obtained with the recombinant human SAA1 hybrid remain controversial, as the protein does not have exactly the same sequence of human SAA1 and its properties may be different from the native SAA1. Other studies have shown that native human SAA1 retains some of the cytokine-like activities such as the G-CSF-induction capability

Recent studies using the Saa1/Saa2 knockout mice showed weakened Th17 response in gut epithelial cells, suggesting that SAA1 plays a role in vivo in the regulation of immunity.
