= Michels syndrome =

- Other names: Oculopalatoskeletal syndrome
- This condition is inherited in an autosomal recessive manner
- Specialty: Medical genetics

Michels syndrome is a syndrome characterised by intellectual disability, craniosynostosis, blepharophimosis, ptosis, epicanthus inversus, highly arched eyebrows, and hypertelorism. People with Michels syndrome vary in other symptoms such as asymmetry of the skull, eyelid, and anterior chamber anomalies, cleft lip and palate, umbilical anomalies, and growth and cognitive development.

== See also ==
- Malpuech facial clefting syndrome, another condition in the 3MC spectrum
