= FCN3 =

Protein-coding gene in humans

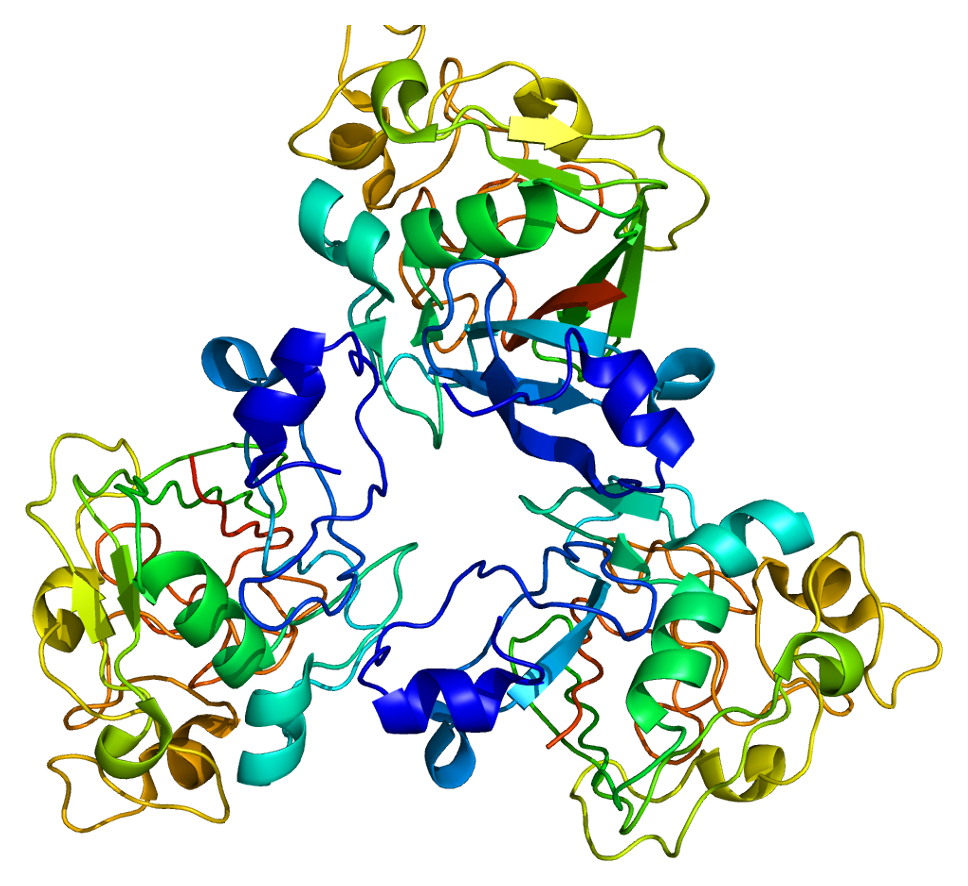

Identifiers
- Aliases: FCN3, FCNH, HAKA1, ficolin 3
- External IDs: OMIM: 604973; GeneCards: FCN3
Available structures
PDB	Human UniProt search: PDBe RCSB
PDB	List of PDB id codes 2J5Z, 2J60, 2J64

Gene location (Human)
Chr.	Chromosome 1 (human)
Band	1p36.11	Start	27,369,110 bp
Band	1p36.11	End	27,374,824 bp
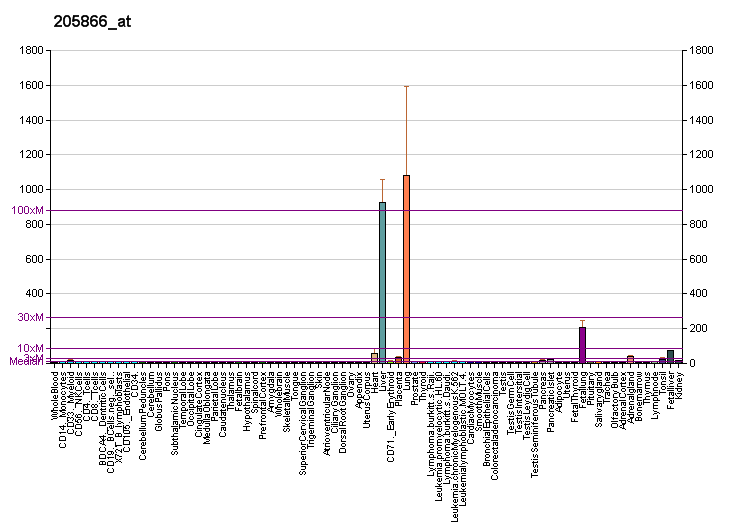
RNA expression pattern
Bgee	Human / Mouse (ortholog); Top expressed in: right lung; upper lobe of left lung; lower lobe of lung; liver; right lobe of liver; right ventricle; left ventricle; metanephric glomerulus; right adrenal cortex; apex of heart / n/a; More reference expression data
BioGPS	More reference expression data
Gene ontology
Molecular function	antigen binding; protein binding; metal ion binding; carbohydrate binding; serine-type endopeptidase activity
Cellular component	extracellular region; collagen; blood microparticle
Biological process	complement activation, lectin pathway; complement activation; recognition of apoptotic cell; negative regulation of RNA biosynthetic process; immune system process; innate immune response; proteolysis
Sources:Amigo / QuickGO
Orthologs
Databases	NCBI: entry; OMA: entry
Species	Human	Mouse
Entrez	8547	n/a
Ensembl	ENSG00000142748	n/a
UniProt	O75636	n/a
RefSeq (mRNA)	NM_003665; NM_173452	n/a
RefSeq (protein)	NP_003656; NP_775628	n/a
Location (UCSC)	Chr 1: 27.37 – 27.37 Mb	n/a
PubMed search		n/a
- Wikidata
View/Edit Human

Ficolin-3 is a protein that in humans is encoded by the FCN3 gene. Ficolin-3 was initially identified as H-ficolin, in which H is after the Hakata antigen that was previously found as an autoantigen in patients who lived in the city of Hakata.

Ficolins are a group of proteins which consist of a collagen-like domain and a fibrinogen-like domain. In human serum, there are two types of ficolins, both of which have lectin activity. The protein encoded by this gene is a thermolabile beta-2-macroglycoprotein found in all human serum and is a member of the ficolin/opsonin p35 lectin family. The protein, which was initially identified based on its reactivity with sera from patients with systemic lupus erythematosus, has been shown to have a calcium-independent lectin activity. The protein can activate the complement pathway in association with MASPs and sMAP, thereby aiding in host defense through the activation of the lectin pathway. Alternative splicing occurs at this locus and two variants, each encoding a distinct isoform, have been identified.
