= MASP1 =

Protein-coding gene in the species Homo sapiens

Identifiers
- Aliases: MASP1, 3MC1, CRARF, CRARF1, MAP1, MASP, MASP3, MAp44, PRSS5, RaRF, mannan binding lectin serine peptidase 1, Mannan-binding lectin serine protease 1, MBL associated serine protease 1, MASP-3, MAP-1
- External IDs: OMIM: 600521; MGI: 88492; GeneCards: MASP1
Available structures
PDB	Ortholog search: PDBe RCSB
PDB	List of PDB id codes 3DEM, 3GOV, 4AQB, 4DJZ, 4IGD, 4IW4, 4KKD

Gene location (Human)
Chr.	Chromosome 3 (human)
Band	3q27.3	Start	187,217,282 bp
Band	3q27.3	End	187,291,980 bp

Gene location (Mouse)
Chr.	Chromosome 16 (mouse)
Band	16|16 B1	Start	23,268,167 bp
Band	16|16 B1	End	23,339,565 bp
RNA expression pattern
Bgee	Human / Mouse (ortholog); Top expressed in: canal of the cervix; right lobe of liver; apex of heart; body of uterus; ectocervix; stromal cell of endometrium; left ventricle; ventricular zone; muscle layer of sigmoid colon; urethra / Top expressed in: decidua; left lobe of liver; ventricular zone; saccule; cumulus cell; gastrula; genital tubercle; stroma of bone marrow; lumbar subsegment of spinal cord; right ventricle; More reference expression data
BioGPS	n/a
Gene ontology
Molecular function	calcium ion binding; peptidase activity; serine-type peptidase activity; protein binding; hydrolase activity; protein homodimerization activity; calcium-dependent protein binding; metal ion binding; serine-type endopeptidase activity
Cellular component	extracellular region; extracellular space; nucleoplasm; cytosol
Biological process	complement activation, lectin pathway; receptor-mediated endocytosis; proteolysis; negative regulation of complement activation; immune system process; innate immune response; complement activation
Sources:Amigo / QuickGO
Orthologs
Databases	NCBI: entry; OMA: entry
Species	Human	Mouse
Entrez	5648	17174
Ensembl	ENSG00000127241	ENSMUSG00000022887
UniProt	P48740	P98064
RefSeq (mRNA)	NM_001031849; NM_001879; NM_139125	NM_008555; NM_001359083
RefSeq (protein)	NP_001027019; NP_001870; NP_624302	NP_032581; NP_001346012
Location (UCSC)	Chr 3: 187.22 – 187.29 Mb	Chr 16: 23.27 – 23.34 Mb
PubMed search
- Wikidata
View/Edit Human	View/Edit Mouse

Mannan-binding lectin serine protease 1 also known as mannose-associated serine protease 1 (MASP-1) is an enzyme that in humans is encoded by the MASP1 gene.

MASP-1 is involved in the lectin pathway of the complement system and is responsible for activating MASP-2 and MASP-3. It is also involved in the process of cleaving complement proteins, C4 and C2, into fragments to form a C3-convertase.

== Function ==
MASP-1 is a serine protease that functions as a component of the lectin pathway of complement activation. The complement pathway plays an essential role in the innate and adaptive immune response as it allows the body to clear foreign material. MASP-1 is synthesized as a zymogen and is activated when it creates a complex of proteins with the pathogen recognition molecules oft the lectin pathway: the mannose-binding lectin and the ficolins. This protein is directly involved in complement activation because MASP-1 activates MASP-2 by cleaving (cutting off a piece) a MASP-2 zymogen. MASP-2 is then able to cleave C4 into proteins C4a and C4b. MASP-1 is also responsible for creating C3 convertase by cleaving C2 into C2b and C2a. C2a and C4b are used to create C3 convertase, a complex that will then be able to cleave C3 into C3a and C3b. However, MASP-1 is useful for biological pathways other than the complement pathway, such as blood clots. MASP-1 can cleave coagulation pathway proteins such as PAR-4, fibrinogen, and factor XIII which leads to high clot and fibrin generation. A spliced variant of this gene, which lacks the serine protease domain, functions as an inhibitor of the complement pathway.

== Structure ==
MASP-1’s structure is similar to other MASP proteins. The MASP1 gene encodes MASP-1 as well as MASP-3 (via alternative splicing). Despite being made from different genes and spliced genes, all MASP proteins have the same structure of a heavy/alpha chain, a light/beta chain, and an interconnecting cysteine disulfide bond. The heavy chain is made up of two CUB domains and two complement control protein (CCP) domains that are connected by an epidermal growth factor segment (EGF). However, the full crystal structure of MASP proteins has not yet been formulated.

== Clinical significance ==
MASP1 gene changes can lead to several diseases in patients due to subsequent MASP-1 protein changes. MASP1 gene changes (polymorphisms) can lead to systemic inflammatory response syndrome (SIRS)/sepsis, malpuech facial clefting (3MC) syndrome, and bacterial colonization in those with cystic fibrosis. Also, MASP-1 is essential for stem cell transplantation as it is involved in the transportation of bone marrow stem cells to the blood. Furthermore, single-nucleotide polymorphisms (SNPs) in MASP1 genes can lead to impaired blood clotting and complement activation. Overproduction of MASP-1 proteins can also be related to some diseases. For example, cardiovascular diseases increase MASP-1 levels, especially in cases such as subacute myocardial infarction. MASP-1 is also upregulated in patients with uterine leiomyosarcoma, and it can potentially activate the alternative pathway of complement in inflammatory arthritis patients. Hepatitis C (HCV), a liver disease, is associated with MASP-1 due to the localization of high concentrations of MASP-1 in infected livers. Higher levels of MASP-1 correlated with severe HCV-related liver fibrosis.

== See also ==
- Complement system
- Mannan-binding lectin
- MASP2 (protein)
