= Mannan-binding lectin-associated serine protease-2 =

Protein found in humans

Identifiers
- EC no.: 3.4.21.104
- CAS no.: 214915-16-9

Databases
- BRENDA: enzyme data
- ExPASy: NiceZyme view
- KEGG: enzyme entry
- MetaCyc: metabolic pathway
- Rhea: reactions
- PDB structures: RCSB PDB PDBe PDBsum
Search
- PMC: articles
- PubMed: articles
- NCBI: proteins

MASP2
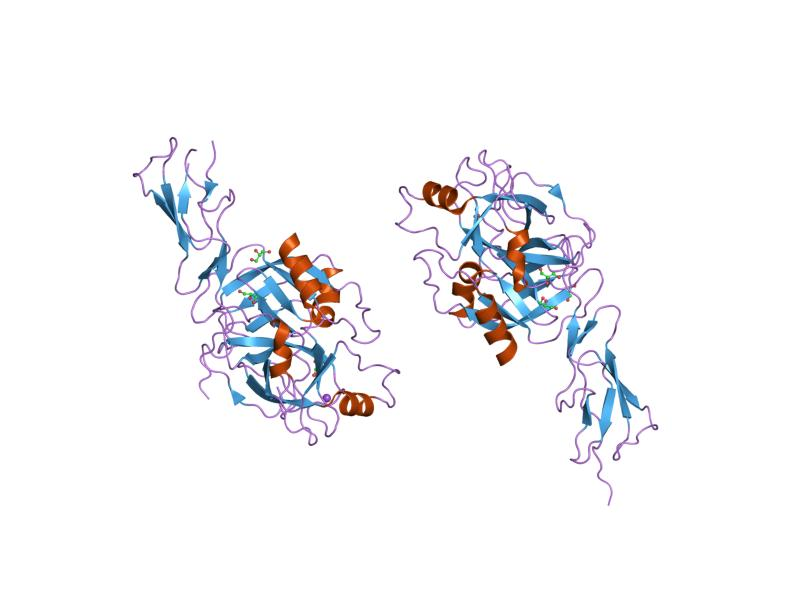

Identifiers
- Aliases: MASP2, MAP19, MASP-2, MASP1P1, sMAP, mannan binding lectin serine peptidase 2, Mannan-binding lectin serine protease 2, MBL associated serine protease 2, MAP-2
- External IDs: OMIM: 605102; MGI: 1330832; GeneCards: MASP2
Available structures
PDB	Ortholog search: PDBe RCSB
PDB	List of PDB id codes 4FXG, 1Q3X, 1SZB, 1ZJK, 3TVJ
Enzyme activity
EC #	BRENDA	ExPASy	KEGG	MetaCyc
3.4.21.104	↗	↗	↗	↗

Gene location (Human)
Chr.	Chromosome 1 (human)
Band	1p36.22	Start	11,026,523 bp
Band	1p36.22	End	11,047,239 bp

Gene location (Mouse)
Chr.	Chromosome 4 (mouse)
Band	4|4 E2	Start	148,687,011 bp
Band	4|4 E2	End	148,699,956 bp
RNA expression pattern
Bgee	Human / Mouse (ortholog); Top expressed in: right lobe of liver; cerebellar hemisphere; right hemisphere of cerebellum; pancreatic ductal cell; left uterine tube; monocyte; muscle of leg; gastrocnemius muscle; skin of leg; tibial nerve / Top expressed in: left lobe of liver; gallbladder; superior surface of tongue; morula; superior frontal gyrus; primary visual cortex; muscle of thigh; ascending aorta; embryo; lumbar spinal ganglion; More reference expression data
BioGPS	n/a
Gene ontology
Molecular function	calcium ion binding; peptidase activity; serine-type peptidase activity; protein binding; hydrolase activity; calcium-dependent protein binding; metal ion binding; complement component C4b binding; serine-type endopeptidase activity
Cellular component	extracellular region; extracellular exosome; extracellular space
Biological process	complement activation, lectin pathway; proteolysis; complement activation, classical pathway; immune system process; innate immune response; complement activation
Sources:Amigo / QuickGO
Orthologs
Databases	NCBI: entry; OMA: entry
Species	Human	Mouse
Entrez	10747	17175
Ensembl	ENSG00000009724	ENSMUSG00000028979
UniProt	O00187	Q91WP0
RefSeq (mRNA)	NM_139208; NM_006610	NM_001003893; NM_010767
RefSeq (protein)	NP_006601; NP_631947	NP_001003893; NP_034897
Location (UCSC)	Chr 1: 11.03 – 11.05 Mb	Chr 4: 148.69 – 148.7 Mb
PubMed search
- Wikidata
View/Edit Human	View/Edit Mouse

Mannan-binding lectin-associated serine protease-2 (EC 3.4.21.104, MASP-2, MASP2, MBP-associated serine protease-2, mannose-binding lectin-associated serine protease-2, p100, mannan-binding lectin-associated serine peptidase 2) is an enzyme that in humans is encoded by the MASP2 gene.

== Function ==
This enzyme catalyses the following chemical reaction

Selective cleavage after Arg^{223} in complement component C2 (-Ser-Leu-Gly-Arg-Lys-Ile-Gln-Ile) and after Arg^{76} in complement component C4 (-Gly-Leu-Gln-Arg-Ala-Leu-Glu-Ile)

This mannan-binding lectin (MBL) recognizes patterns of neutral carbohydrates, such as mannose and N-acetylglucosamine.

The Ra-reactive factor (RARF) is a complement-dependent bactericidal factor that binds to the Ra and R2 polysaccharides expressed by certain enterobacteria. Alternate splicing of this gene results in two transcript variants encoding two RARF components that are involved in the mannan-binding lectin pathway of complement activation. The longer isoform is cleaved into two chains which form a heterodimer linked by a disulfide bond. The encoded proteins are members of the trypsin family of peptidases.

MASP-2 is involved in the complement system. MASP-2 is very similar to the C1s molecule, of the classical complement pathway, and they are thought to have a common evolutionary ancestor. When the carbohydrate-recognising heads of MBL bind to specifically arranged mannose residues on the surface of a pathogen, MASP-2 is activated to cleave complement components C4 and C2 into C4a, C4b, C2a, and C2b.

== See also ==
- MASP1 (protein)
- Mannan-binding lectin
- Mannan-binding lectin pathway (lectin pathway)
