= Lectin pathway =

Type of cascade reaction in the complement system

Structure of mannose in its α-D mannopyranose form. Mannan is a polymer of mannose.

The lectin pathway or MBL pathway is a type of cascade reaction in the complement system, similar in structure to the classical complement pathway, in that, after activation, it proceeds through the action of C4 and C2 to produce activated complement proteins further down the cascade. In contrast to the classical complement pathway, the lectin pathway does not recognize an antibody bound to its target. The lectin pathway starts with mannose-binding lectin (MBL) or ficolin binding to certain sugars.

In this pathway, mannose-binding lectin binds to mannose, glucose, or other sugars with 3- and 4-OH groups placed in the equatorial plane, in terminal positions on carbohydrate or glycoprotein components of microorganisms including bacteria such as Salmonella, Listeria, and Neisseria strains. Fungal pathogens such as Candida albicans and Cryptococcus neoformans as well as some viruses such as HIV-1 and Respiratory syncytial virus (RSV) are bound by MBL.

Mannan-binding lectin, also called mannose-binding protein or mannose-binding-lectin (MBL), is a protein belonging to the collectin family that is produced by the liver and can initiate the complement cascade by binding to pathogen surfaces.

== MBL ==
MBL forms oligomers of trimers (such that 6- and 18-subunit oligomers correspond to a dimer and a hexamer, respectively). Multimers of MBL form a complex with MASP1 (Mannose-binding lectin-Associated Serine Protease), MASP2 and MASP3, that are protease zymogens. The MASPs are very similar to C1r and C1s molecules of the classical complement pathway. When the carbohydrate-recognising heads of MBL bind to specifically arranged mannose residues on the surface of a pathogen, MASP-1 and MASP-2 are activated to cleave complement components C4 and C2 into C4a, C4b, C2a, and C2b. In addition, two smaller MBL-associated proteins (MAps) are found in complex with MBL. MBL-associated protein of 19 kDa (MAp19) and MBL-associated protein of 44 kDa (Map44). MASP-1, MASP-3 and MAp44 are alternative splice products of the MASP1 gene, while MASP-2 and MAp19 are alternative splice products of the MASP-2 gene. MAp44 has been suggested to act as a competitive inhibitor of lectin pathway activation, by displacing MASP-2 from MBL, hence preventing cleavage of C4 and C2

== C3 convertase ==
C4b tends to bind to bacterial cell membranes. If it is not then inactivated, it will combine with C2a to form the classical C3 convertase (C4bC2a) on the surface of the pathogen, as opposed to the alternative C3 convertase (C3bBb) involved in the alternative pathway. C4a and C2b act as potent cytokines, with C4a causing degranulation of mast cells and basophils and C2b acting to increase vascular permeability. Historically, the larger fragment of C2 was called C2a but some publications now refer to it as C2b in keeping with the convention of assigning 'b' to the larger fragment.

== Clinical significance ==
Mannose-binding Lectin deficiency - These individuals are prone to recurrent infections, including infections of the upper respiratory tract and other body systems. People with this condition may also contract more serious infections such as pneumonia and meningitis. Depending on the type of infection, the symptoms caused by the infections vary in frequency and severity. Although the clinical significance of MBL-Deficiency is debated.

Infants and young children with mannose-binding lectin deficiency seem to be more susceptible to infections, but adults can also develop recurrent infections. In addition, affected individuals undergoing chemotherapy or taking drugs that suppress the immune system are especially prone to infections.

== See also ==
- Classical complement pathway
- Alternative complement pathway
- Mannan-binding lectin
