= SAA2 =

Protein-coding gene in the species Homo sapiens

Identifiers
- Aliases: SAA2, serum amyloid A2, SAA1, SAA
- External IDs: OMIM: 104751; MGI: 98223; GeneCards: SAA2; OMA:SAA2 - orthologs

Gene location (Human)
Chr.	Chromosome 11 (human)
Band	11p15.1	Start	18,239,223 bp
Band	11p15.1	End	18,248,643 bp

Gene location (Mouse)
Chr.	Chromosome 7 (mouse)
Band	7 B3|7 30.51 cM	Start	46,361,422 bp
Band	7 B3|7 30.51 cM	End	46,365,124 bp
RNA expression pattern
Bgee	Human / Mouse (ortholog); Top expressed in: right lobe of liver; olfactory zone of nasal mucosa; salivary gland; minor salivary glands; lactiferous gland; appendix; subcutaneous adipose tissue; right adrenal cortex; left uterine tube; gastrocnemius muscle / Top expressed in: ankle joint; left lobe of liver; thymus; thoracic diaphragm; stroma of bone marrow; white adipose tissue; ciliary body; cervix; retinal pigment epithelium; lactiferous gland; More reference expression data
BioGPS	n/a
Gene ontology
Molecular function	chemoattractant activity
Cellular component	extracellular exosome; extracellular region; high-density lipoprotein particle; extracellular space
Biological process	acute-phase response; cell chemotaxis; positive chemotaxis
Sources:Amigo / QuickGO
Orthologs
Species	Human	Mouse
Entrez	6289	20210
Ensembl	ENSG00000134339	ENSMUSG00000040026
UniProt	P0DJI9	P04918
RefSeq (mRNA)	NM_030754; NM_001127380	NM_011315
RefSeq (protein)	NP_001120852; NP_110381	NP_035445
Location (UCSC)	Chr 11: 18.24 – 18.25 Mb	Chr 7: 46.36 – 46.37 Mb
PubMed search
- Wikidata
View/Edit Human	View/Edit Mouse

Serum amyloid A protein is a protein that in humans is encoded by the SAA2 gene.
