= Ficolin =

Family of proteins

Ficolins are pattern recognition receptors that bind to acetyl groups present in the carbohydrates of bacterial surfaces and mediate activation of the lectin pathway of the complement cascade.

== Structure ==
Ficolins (Fi+Col+Lin) are a group of oligomeric lectins with N-terminal collagen-like domain and a C-terminal fibrinogen-like domain. The primary ficolin structure contains 288 amino acids. The combination of collagen-like and fibrinogen-like domain allows the protein to form a basic subunit containing a triple helical tail and a trio of globular heads.

Ficolins are produced in the liver by hepatocytes and in the lung by alveolar cells type II, neutrophils and monocytes.

== Role in innate immunity ==
Exocrine secretions provide a variety of soluble factors that are able to protect the body from potential pathogens.

Together with pentraxins, collectins and C1q molecules, ficolins constitute the soluble pattern-recognition molecules (PRMs) which play an important role in humoral innate immunity. Ficolins recognise carbohydrate structures on pathogens' surfaces as their pathogen-associated molecular pattern (PAMP) and activate the lectin pathway of the complement cascade. Specifically, ficolins bind to acetyl groups present in certain bacterial molecules, such as N-acetylglucosamine, a component of peptidoglycan in the bacterial cell wall. When ficolins bind to their PAMP ligands by their C-terminal fibrinogen-like domain, they initiate the proteolytic complement cascade, facilitated by the mannose-binding protein-associated serine proteases (MASPs) that ficolins are associated to and co-circulate with. Serine proteases then cleave a number of soluble complement proteins leading to complement activation, opsonisation, generation of proinflammatory mediators, and cell lysis.

Collectins and ficolins are also called collagenous lectins. The collection family constitutes calcium-dependent proteins. In contrast, the ficolin family does not bind to PAMPs in a calcium-dependent way.

== Types of ficolin ==
Three ficolins have been identified in humans:

1. M-ficolin (FCN1), monocyte ficolin
2. L-ficolin (FCN2), liver ficolin
3. H-ficolin (FCN3), hakata antigen.

Ficolin-1 and ficolin-2 are encoded be a gene localised on chromosome 9 (9q34) and they share approximately 80% identity in amino sequence. Ficolin-3 is encoded by chromosome 1 and it has about 50% identity with the other two ficolins. A cross-reactivity of the ficolins in human serum has been observed.

== Clinical references ==
The concentration of ficolins in healthy serum is between 3 and 5 μg/mL.

As Ficolin-2 and 3 are expressed by hepatocytes, their levels decrease in advanced liver diseases like cirrhosis. Low ficolin levels contribute to cirrhosis-associated immune dysfunction.

Immunologist Jeak L. Ding and her team found that natural IgG (nIgG; a non-specific immunoglobulin of adaptive immunity) is not quiescent, but plays a crucial role in immediate immune defense by collaborating with ficolin (an innate immune protein).
