= C5AR2 =

Protein-coding gene in the species Homo sapiens

Identifiers
- Aliases: C5AR2, C5L2, GPR77, complement component 5a receptor 2, complement C5a receptor 2, C5a2
- External IDs: OMIM: 609949; MGI: 2442013; GeneCards: C5AR2

Gene location (Human)
Chr.	Chromosome 19 (human)
Band	19q13.32	Start	47,332,175 bp
Band	19q13.32	End	47,347,329 bp

Gene location (Mouse)
Chr.	Chromosome 7 (mouse)
Band	7|7 A2	Start	15,968,510 bp
Band	7|7 A2	End	15,978,079 bp
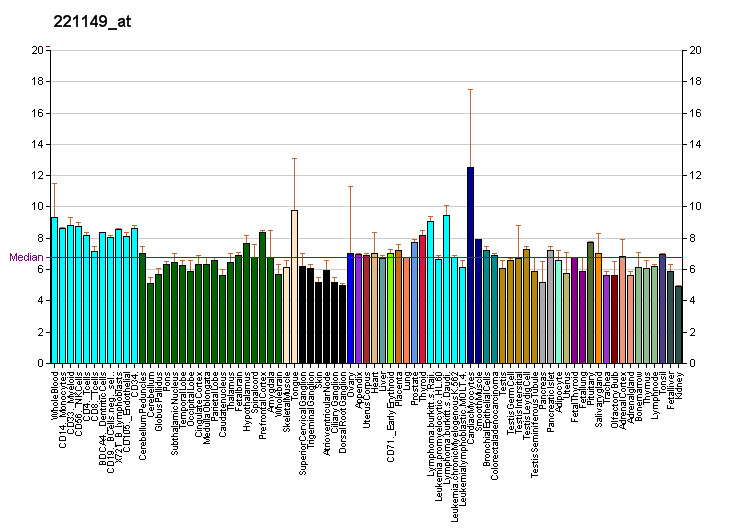
RNA expression pattern
Bgee	Human / Mouse (ortholog); Top expressed in: monocyte; blood; granulocyte; spleen; right lung; testicle; upper lobe of left lung; gastric mucosa; bone marrow cell; left uterine tube / Top expressed in: granulocyte; yolk sac; placenta; secondary oocyte; liver; bone marrow; primary oocyte; jejunum; esophagus; ileum; More reference expression data
BioGPS	More reference expression data
Gene ontology
Molecular function	protein binding; signal transducer activity; complement component C5a receptor activity; G protein-coupled receptor activity
Cellular component	integral component of membrane; plasma membrane; basal plasma membrane; apical part of cell; membrane; integral component of plasma membrane
Biological process	negative regulation of neutrophil chemotaxis; chemotaxis; G protein-coupled receptor signaling pathway; negative regulation of tumor necrosis factor production; signal transduction; positive regulation of ERK1 and ERK2 cascade; positive regulation of epithelial cell proliferation; regulation of complement activation; inflammatory response; phospholipase C-activating G protein-coupled receptor signaling pathway; positive regulation of cytosolic calcium ion concentration; complement component C5a signaling pathway; complement receptor mediated signaling pathway
Sources:Amigo / QuickGO
Orthologs
Databases	NCBI: entry; OMA: entry
Species	Human	Mouse
Entrez	27202	319430
Ensembl	ENSG00000134830	ENSMUSG00000074361
UniProt	Q9P296	Q8BW93
RefSeq (mRNA)	NM_001271749; NM_001271750; NM_018485	NM_001146005; NM_176912
RefSeq (protein)	NP_001258678; NP_001258679; NP_060955	NP_001139477; NP_795886
Location (UCSC)	Chr 19: 47.33 – 47.35 Mb	Chr 7: 15.97 – 15.98 Mb
PubMed search
- Wikidata
View/Edit Human	View/Edit Mouse

Complement component 5a receptor 2 is a protein of the complement system that in humans is encoded by the C5AR2 gene. It is highly expressed in the blood and spleen, predominantly by myeloid cells.

== Function ==
The anaphylatoxins C3a and C5a are fragments of C3 and C5 generated via proteolytic cleavage by C3 convertases and C5 convertases during the complement cascade. They are pro-inflammatory mediators which bind to the anaphylatoxin receptors, C3aR, C5aR1 and C5aR2. The anaphylatoxin receptors are a family of three proteins which beloing to the G protein-coupled receptor superfamily. C3aR and C5aR1 bind C3a and C5a, respectively, which mediate a broad range of effects in host defense, including chemoattraction, vasodilation and immune cell activation. C5aR2 binds C5a, but lacks GPCR activity, and its function is less well understood.

C5aR2 was initially thought be a decoy receptor, acting as a sink for C5a to negatively regulate C5aR1 function. However, more recent research has uncovered independent roles for C5aR2, including modulation of the innate immune response in myeloid cells, translocation of C5a to drive transendothelial migration of neutrophils, β-arrestin recruitment and modulation of ERK signalling and modulation of lipid metabolism in obesity through C3a-desArg binding. C5aR2 has been implicated in a broad range of inflammatory and infectious diseases.
