= C3a =

C3a may refer to:

- C3a (complement)
- C3a receptor
- C_{3}A, or 3CaO·Al_{2}O_{3}, tricalcium aluminate in cement chemist notation, one of the 4 mineral phases of the Portland clinker
