= Louis Pillemer =

American physician

Louis Pillemer (1908 – August 31, 1957) was an American immunologist, an early investigator of the alternative complement pathway (a system of defense not dependent upon antibodies).

== Biography ==
Pillemer was born in Johannesburg, South Africa, in 1908, the son of Lithuanian parents. He was brought to the United States at the age of one year, and was naturalized in 1916. He attended public schools in Catlettsburg and Ashland, Kentucky, and began collegiate work at Ohio State University in Columbus, Ohio, later attending Marshall College at Huntington, West Virginia, and Duke University at Durham, North Carolina. At Duke he received a B.S. degree in 1932, and started studying medicine in the same school, he however quit the course in middle of his third year.

Kentucky at the time encouraged those with medical knowledge to serve patients in areas not normally served by physicians, he passed the examination required and began to travel across the state on horseback, visiting and tending to the sick. He quit this job in 1935 and entered graduate school at Western Reserve University where he would stay rest of his life. He earned a reputation as an excellent biochemist and was the first to purify tetanus and diphtheria toxins which were later used to develop the DPT vaccine.

Pillemer later began to conduct experiments related to the complement system, he was intrigued by experiments at the time which showed that mixing human serum with zymosan resulted in the loss of C3 component of the complement system. This led him to the discovery of properdin in 1954.

By 1957, Pillemer's behaviour started to become erratic and he began abusing alcohol and experimenting with drugs. On 31 August of the same year, Pillemer was found dead at his home in Cleveland Heights, Ohio, at the age of 49 years. He died due to acute barbiturate intoxication. His death which happened soon after the publication of Nelson's objections, was ruled a suicide. He was survived by a wife and four young sons.

== Properdin Discovery ==
He led a team at Western Reserve University which discovered properdin in 1954, and this discovery received attention from the national press as a breakthrough in immunology.

In 1957, Robert Nelson challenged these findings, and claimed that Pillemer's results were due to laboratory errors. Nelson's view prevailed at the time, but further study in the 1960s largely led to a confirmation of much of Pillemer's work.
