= Complement component 3a =

The classical and alternative complement pathways.

Complement component 3a (C3a) is a proteins fragment formed by the cleavage of complement component 3. C3a is a 77 residue anaphylatoxin that binds to the C3a receptor (C3aR), a class A G protein-coupled receptor. It plays a large role in the immune response.

C3a molecules induce responses through the GPCR C3a receptor. Like other anaphylatoxins, C3a is regulated by cleavage of its carboxy-terminal arginine, which results in a molecule with lowered inflammatory function (C3a desarginine).

C3a is an effector of the complement system with a range of functions including T cell activation and survival, angiogenesis stimulation, chemotaxis, mast cell degranulation, and macrophage activation. It has been shown to have both proinflammatory and anti-inflammatory responses, its activity able to counteract the proinflammatory effects of C5a.

Initial research in mice demonstrating an effective treatment after stroke is leading to further investigation to determine whether application to humans has potential.

== Structure ==
=== C3a ===
C3a is a strongly basic and highly cationic 77 residue protein with a molecular mass of approximately 10 kDa. Residues 17-66 are made up of three anti-parallel helices and three disulfide bonds, which confer stability to the protein. The N-terminus consists of a fourth flexible helical structure, while the C terminus is disordered. C3a has a regulatory process and a structure homologous to complement component C5a, with which it shares 36% of its sequence identity.

=== Receptor ===
C3a induces an immunological response through a 482 residue G-protein-coupled receptor called C3a receptor (C3aR). The C3aR is similarly structurally homologous to C5aR, but contains an extracellular domain with more than 160 amino acids. Specific binding sites for interactions between C3a and C3aR are unknown, but it has been shown that sulfation of tyrosine 174, one of the amino acids in the extracellular domain, is required for C3a binding. It has also been demonstrated that the C3aR N terminus is not required for ligand binding.

== Formation ==
C3a formation occurs through activation and cleavage of complement component 3 in a reaction catalyzed by C3-convertase. There are three pathways of activation, each of which leads to the formation of C3a and C3b, which is involved in antigen opsonization. Other than the alternative pathway, which is constantly active, C3a formation is triggered by pathogenic infection.

=== Classical pathway ===
The classical pathway of complement activation is initiated when the C1 complex, made up of C1r and C1s serine proteases, recognizes the Fc region of IgM or IgG antibodies bound to a pathogen. C1q mediates the classical pathway by activating the C1 complex, which cleaves C4 and C2 into smaller fragments (C4a, C4b, C2a, and C2b). C4a and C2b form C4bC2b, also known as C3 convertase.

=== Lectin pathway ===
The lectin pathway is activated when pattern-recognition receptors, like mannan-binding lectin or ficolins, recognize and bind to pathogen-associated molecular patterns on the antigen, including sugars. These bound receptors then complex with Mannose-Binding Lectin-Associated Serine Proteases (MASPs), which have proteolytic activity similar to the C1 complex. The MASPs cleave C4 and C2, resulting in C3 convertase formation.

=== Alternative pathway ===
The alternative pathway of complement activation is typically always active at low levels in blood plasma through a process called tick-over, in which C3 spontaneously hydrolyzes into its active form, C3(H_{2}O). This activation induces a conformational change in the thioester domain of C3(H_{2}O) that allows it to bind to a plasma protein called Factor B. This complex is then cleaved by Factor D, a serine protease, to form C3b(H_{2}O)Bb, or fluid-phase C3-convertase. This complex has the ability to catalyze the formation of C3a and C3b after it binds properdin, a globulin protein, and is stabilized.

== Functions ==
Anaphylatoxins are small complement peptides that induce proinflammatory responses in tissues. C3a is primarily regarded for its role in the innate and adaptive immune responses as an anaphylatoxin, moderating and activating multiple inflammatory pathways.

=== Role in innate immunity ===
The roles of C3a in innate immunity, upon binding C3aR, include increased vasodilation via endothelial cell contraction, increased vascular permeability, and mast cell and basophil degranulation of histamine, induction of respiratory burst and subsequent degradation of pathogens by neutrophils, macrophages, and eosinophils, and regulation of cationic eosinophil protein migration, adhesion, and production. C3a is also able to play a role in chemotaxis for mast cells and eosinophils, but C5a is a more potent chemoattractant.

Traditionally thought to serve a strictly pro-inflammatory role, recent investigations have shown that C3a can also work against C5a to serve an anti-inflammatory role. In addition, migration and degranulation of neutrophils can be suppressed in the presence of C3a.

=== Role in adaptive immunity ===
C3a also plays an important role in adaptive immunity, moderating leukocyte production and proliferation. C3a is able to regulate B cell and monocyte production of IL-6 and TNF-α, and human C3a has been shown to dampen the polyclonal immune response through dose-dependent regulation of B cell molecule production. C3aR signaling along antigen-presenting cells' CD28 and CD40L pathways also plays a role in T cell proliferation and differentiation. C3aR has been shown to be necessary for TH1 cell generation and regulates TH1 IL-10 expression, while an absence of active C3aR on dendritic cells upregulates regulatory T cell production. The absence of C3 has also been shown to decrease IL-2 receptor expression on T cells.

== Regulation ==
=== Regulation of complement activation ===
Levels of complement are regulated by moderating convertase formation and enzymatic activity. C3 convertase formation is primarily regulated by levels of active C3b and C4b. Factor I, a serine protease activated by cofactors, can cleave and C3b and C4b, thus preventing convertase formation. C3 convertase activity is also regulated without C3b inactivation, through complement control proteins, including decay-accelerating factors that function to speed up C3 convertase half-lives and avert convertase formation.

=== Deactivation ===
C3a, like other anaphylatoxins, has a C-terminal arginine residue. Serum carboxypeptidase B, a protease, cleaves the arginine residue from C3a, forming the desArg derivative of C3a, also known as acylation stimulating protein (ASP). Unlike C5a desArg, this version of C3a has no proinflammatory activity. However, ASP functions as a hormone in the adipose tissue, moderating fatty acid migration to adipocytes and triacylglycerol synthesis. In addition, it has been shown that ASP downregulates the polyclonal immune response in the same way C3a does.
