= Anaphylatoxin receptors =

Group of G-protein coupled receptors

The anaphylatoxin receptors are a group of G-protein coupled receptors which bind anaphylatoxins. Members of this family include:

- C3a receptor C3AR1
- C5a receptor C5AR1
- C5L2 GPR77
