= Inactivated complement component 3b =

Protein part of the complement system

iC3b is a protein fragment that is part of the complement system, a component of the vertebrate immune system. iC3b is produced when complement factor I cleaves C3b. Complement receptors on white blood cells are able to bind iC3b, so iC3b functions as an opsonin. Unlike intact C3b, iC3b cannot associate with factor B, thus preventing amplification of the complement cascade through the alternative pathway. Complement factor I can further cleave iC3b into a protein fragment known as C3d.
