= Properdin =

Protein-coding gene in the species Homo sapiens

CFP

Identifiers
- Aliases: CFP, BFD, PFC, PFD, PROPERDIN, complement factor properdin, properdin
- External IDs: OMIM: 300383; MGI: 97545; GeneCards: CFP
Available structures
PDB	Ortholog search: PDBe RCSB
PDB	List of PDB id codes 1W0R, 1W0S

Gene location (Human)
Chr.	X chromosome (human)
Band	Xp11.23	Start	47,623,172 bp
Band	Xp11.23	End	47,630,305 bp

Gene location (Mouse)
Chr.	X chromosome (mouse)
Band	X A1.3|X 16.44 cM	Start	20,791,693 bp
Band	X A1.3|X 16.44 cM	End	20,797,794 bp
RNA expression pattern
Bgee	Human / Mouse (ortholog); Top expressed in: granulocyte; monocyte; blood; spleen; bone marrow; bone marrow cell; gonad; appendix; lymph node; right lung / Top expressed in: granulocyte; stroma of bone marrow; spleen; mesenteric lymph nodes; ankle joint; right lobe of liver; axillary lymph node; white adipose tissue; tibiofemoral joint; thymus; More reference expression data
BioGPS	n/a
Gene ontology
Molecular function	protein binding; serine-type endopeptidase activity
Cellular component	extracellular matrix; endoplasmic reticulum lumen; extracellular region; extracellular space; specific granule lumen; tertiary granule lumen; collagen-containing extracellular matrix
Biological process	immune response; regulation of complement activation; defense response to bacterium; immune system process; complement activation; protein O-linked fucosylation; complement activation, alternative pathway; innate immune response; neutrophil degranulation; proteolysis
Sources:Amigo / QuickGO
Orthologs
Databases	NCBI: entry; OMA: entry
Species	Human	Mouse
Entrez	5199	18636
Ensembl	ENSG00000126759	ENSMUSG00000001128
UniProt	P27918	P11680
RefSeq (mRNA)	NM_002621; NM_001145252	NM_008823
RefSeq (protein)	NP_001138724; NP_002612	NP_032849
Location (UCSC)	Chr X: 47.62 – 47.63 Mb	Chr X: 20.79 – 20.8 Mb
PubMed search
- Wikidata
View/Edit Human	View/Edit Mouse

Properdin is a protein that in humans is encoded by the CFP (complement factor properdin) gene. Properdin and factor H are regulatory proteins in the alternative complement pathway. Properdin is an up-regulator, stabilizing the C3bBb complex, and factor H is the down-regulator, promoting proteolytic degradation of C3b. Factor H is primarily produced in the liver, whereas properdin is sourced in neutrophils, monocytes, T cells and bone marrow progenitor cell line.

Properdin is plasma glycoprotein that activates the complement system of the innate immune system. It is found in plasma and primarily produced by leukocytes. This protein binds to bacterial cell walls and dying human cells to stabilize the C3 and C5-convertase enzyme complexes to form an attack complex that leads to the lysis of the cell. The complement system is made of plasma and membrane-bound proteins that go through the blood to get rid of pathogens and damaged cells. Activation of the complement system occurs via three pathways, the classical, lectin, and alternative pathways. Activation of the alternative pathway occurs in bacteria, yeast, and parasites and is stimulated by antibody-antigen complexes made of IgG or IgA. Properdin and factor H are important regulatory proteins of the alternative pathway, which is initiated by a conformational change in C3 cleaved at a single site by the serine protease C3 convertase.

== Structure ==
Properdin is a gamma globulin protein composed of multiple identical protein subunits with a separate ligand-binding site. Native properdin occurs in head-to-tail dimers, trimers and tetramers in the fixed ratio 22:52:28. Under physiological conditions, properdin forms P2, P3, and P4 in a 26:54:20 ratio by a head-to-tail formation of monomers. The structure is a single-chain molecule made of 469 amino acids, with the leader sequence consisting of 27-amino acids. Every properdin monomer is made of six thrombospondin type 1 repeat (TSR) domains labeled TSR1-6, each including a core of three antiparallel strands with three disulfides, totaling 60 amino acids. Properdin undergoes post-translation through C-mannosylation, O-fucosylation, N-glycosylation, and C-glycosylation.

== Function ==
It is known that it participates in some specific immune responses. It plays a part in tissue inflammation as well as the engulfing of pathogens by phagocytes. In addition it is known to help to neutralize some viruses.

The properdin promotes the association of C3b with Factor B and provides a focal point for the assembly of C3bBb on a surface. It binds to preformed alternative pathway C3-convertases. Properdin also inhibits the Factor H – mediated cleavage of C3b by Factor I. Properdin, in addition to Factor H, can bind to glycosaminoglycan (GAG) epitopes by renal tubular heparin sulfates. Additionally, the binding of properdin to Salmonella typhosa lipopolysaccharide (LPS) and Neisseria meningitidis lipopolysaccharide result in activation of the complementary alternative pathway. Furthermore, it binds to various microbial surfaces, resulting in the assembly of the alternative pathway C3 convertase.

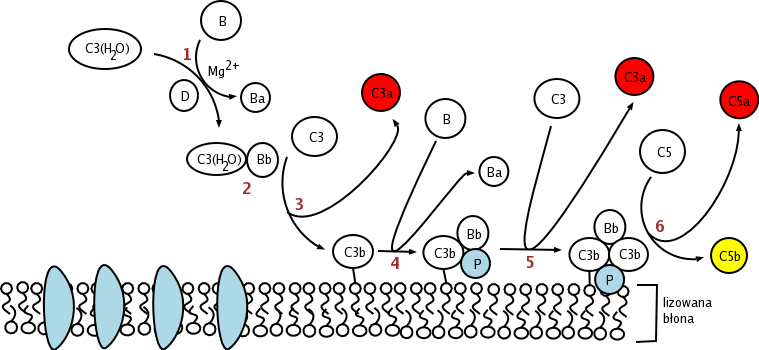
Alternative pathway. Properdin is the "P" in the blue circles. (Some labels are in Polish.)

Properdin promotes phagocytosis of apoptotic T cells in two ways. One way is through binding to apoptotic T cells, which initiates AP-mediated C3b deposition, promoting cell uptake through CR3-bearing phagocytes. Another way is through properdin binding on T cells and directly mediating phagocytes. Properdin contains abilities to eliminate apoptotic cells in order to reduce harmful inflammatory and autoimmune reactions. Additionally, properdin binds malignant T cell lines, therefore, properdin deficiency may be a risk in the development of specific T cell malignancies.

The alternative pathway is not dependent on antibodies. This branch of the complement system is activated by IgA immune complexes and bacterial endotoxins, polysaccharides, and cell walls, and results in producing anaphylatoxins, opsonins, chemotactic factors, and the membrane attack complex, all of which help fight pathogens.

== Complement pathway ==
The complement pathway may be initiated by three pathways, including the classical, lectin, and alternative pathways.

- In the classical pathway, C1 complex recognizes two IgGs or one pentamer IgM, forming an antigen-antibody complex.
- For the lectin pathway, mannose-binding lectin (MBL) and their associated serine proteins (MASPs), recognize carbohydrates on pathogens, which initiates the C3 convertase C4b2b.
- The alternative pathway is different due to its spontaneous activation in fluid phase by hydrolysis of C3 to C3(H_{2}O). C3(H_{2}O) can bind to Factor B, which can then be cleaved by the serum protease Factor D, resulting in formation of C3(H_{2}O)Bb. C3(H_{2}O)Bb can cleave additional C3 molecules, creating C3b and C3a.

== Tissue distribution ==
Cell Source	Form	Stimulus
Primary Cells		
Monocytes	mRNA; Protein	Constitutive
Dendritic cells	mRNA; Protein	Constitutive
Primary T cells	mRNA	Constitutive
Mast cells	Protein	Constitutive
Granulocytes	mRNA; Protein	Constitutive
Macrophages	mRNA	Constitutive
Adipocytes	mRNA; Protein	Constitutive
Endothelial cells	mRNA; Protein	Shear stress

Sources: Monocytes; Dendritic cells; Primary T cells; Mast cells; Granulocytes; Macrophages; Adipocytes; Endothelial cells

Most complement systems are synthesized by hepatocytes in the liver, however, properdin is synthesized by neutrophils, monocytes, and T cells. Properdin is a positive regulator of the alternative pathway through its mechanism of stabilizing the C3 convertase (C3bBb). Primary T cells, monocytes, macrophages, dendritic cells, granulocytes, and mast cells synthesize mRNA to secrete properdin. Functional properdin is a product of human liver-derived HEP G2 cells. Properdin localized in the granules of neutrophils are released by TNF, TNF/fMLP, PMA, C5a, or IL-8. Additionally, neutrophils promote complement activation upon binding of cytokines, which stabilizes the alternative pathway via release of properdin, increasing defense against microorganisms. Properdin sourced from T cells promote phagocytosis of apoptotic T cells, which is an indication of their function in recognizing and clearing out apoptotic cells. Properdin is also sourced in endothelial cells along with the other complement proteins. Endothelial gene transcripts are induced when shear stress occurs, followed by properdin release into extracellular compartments.

Properdin plays an important role in tissue regulation, energy metabolism, and lipid metabolism. An experiment in properdin deficient mice concluded that properdin deficiency results in fat storage and less energy output in comparison to wild-type mice. Properdin regulates fatty acid uptake into adipose tissue. Complement proteins are also involved in cartilage transformation. C3, factor B and properdin have been observed in the resting zone of cartilage, and the alternative pathway likely plays a role in cartilage development.

== Deficiency ==
Complement defects are associated with an increased risk of infectious or local and inflammatory thrombotic disorders. These complement-linked disorders are rare but tend to show up during childhood. Hereditary angioedema (HAE) result from impaired function of the C1 inhibitor, and complement disorders result in renal disorders, including atypical hemolytic uremic syndrome (aHUS) or C3 glomerulopathy (C3G).

Properdin deficiency is a rare X-linked disease in which properdin is deficient. Affected individuals are susceptible to fulminant meningococcal disease, whereas defects of the classical pathway increase the risk of autoimmune disorders. Properdin deficiency has been reported in more than 70 patients, and is linked to infections with Neisseria meningitides and Neisseria gonorrhoea. Mortality rates are higher in individuals with properdin deficiency in comparison to those with terminal complement deficiencies. Three classes of properdin deficiencies are

- Type I: Properdin levels are unable to be detected
- Type II: Properdin levels are from 1-10% in comparison to normal levels; function is intact
- Type III: Properdin levels are normal but the function is absent

Evaluations for properdin deficiency may take place in patients with frequent Neisserial infections with a functioning classical complement pathway (CH50). The AH50 assay is based on the lysis of unsensitized rabbit erythrocytes, however, normal results have been reported in patients with Type I properdin deficiency. Family history of X-linked inheritance should be considered. Further testing includes: Factor D Function by Hemolytic Assay, Properdin Level by ELISA, and gene sequencing to detect mutations for confirmation.

Patients with Factor D deficiency or properdin deficiency are advised to receive meningococcal vaccinations and frequent evaluations for meningococcal antibodies. For those with recurring infections, prophylactic antibiotics are administered.

== History ==
Properdin was discovered in 1954 by Dr. Louis Pillemer of the Institute of Pathology (now the Department of Pathology at Case Western Reserve University). He was an American immunologist and investigated the complement system, a system of defense not dependent upon antibodies. At Case Western, he was the first to purify tetanus and dipheria toxins, which were used to develop the DPT vaccine.

The complement system was discovered more than 100 years ago, when experiments proved that lysing of microbial targets could be induced by a "complementary" mixture of human serum and antibody mixtures. The alternative pathway was discovered when Dr. Louis Pillemer observed partial purification of the plasma protein properdin, and its ability to activate the complement system on various targets without using antibodies. In the 1970s, evidence was found of an antibody-independent complement activation pathway. Protein purification methods were utilized to model complement activation, such as the alternative pathway C3 convertase.
