= Shunt nephritis =

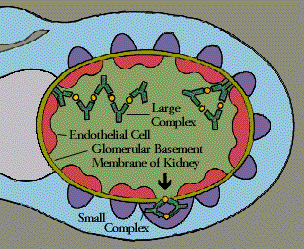
- Shunt nephritis is caused by the deposition of immune complexes, as shown in this illustration.
- Specialty: Nephrology

Shunt nephritis is a rare disease of the kidney that can occur in patients being treated for hydrocephalus with a cerebral shunt. It usually results from an infected shunt that produces a long-standing blood infection, particularly by the bacterium Staphylococcus epidermidis. Kidney disease results from an immune response that deposits immune complexes in the kidney. The most common signs and symptoms of the condition are blood and protein in the urine, anemia, and high blood pressure. Diagnosis is based on these findings in the context of characteristic laboratory values. Treatment includes antibiotics and the prompt removal of the infected shunt. Over half of individuals with shunt nephritis recover completely; most of the remainder have some degree of persistent kidney disease.

== Presentation ==
The clinical presentation of shunt nephritis is variable, but the most common manifestations of shunt nephritis include blood in the urine, protein in the urine, anemia, and high blood pressure. Recurrent fever, enlarged liver and spleen, and a skin rash may also be present. Rarely, the major complaint may be arthritis.

== Pathophysiology ==
Shunt nephritis occurs when a shunt becomes infected with bacteria, most commonly Staphylococcus epidermidis. Bacteria from this infected shunt seed the bloodstream, leading to blood infection (bacteremia). In response to long-standing infection (months to years), the body mounts an immune response that results in deposition of immune complexes in the kidney, leading to nephritis.

== Diagnosis ==
Urinalysis typically demonstrates hematuria and proteinuria. Levels of the complement protein C3 are low, while levels of C-reactive protein and cryoglobulins may be modestly elevated. Blood cultures and cerebrospinal fluid cultures demonstrate Staphylococcus epidermidis, a coagulase-negative species of Staphylococcus. Biopsy of the kidney frequently demonstrates membranoproliferative glomerulonephritis, with deposits of C3, IgM, and IgG.

== Treatment ==
Management is focused on removing the infectious source. The shunt is removed immediately and antibiotics are begun. The infected shunt, typically a ventriculoatrial shunt, may be replaced with a ventriculoperitoneal shunt.

== Prognosis ==
In one review, over half of individuals with shunt nephritis made a complete recovery. An additional 40% of individuals had persistent urine abnormalities or end-stage renal disease. Death occurred in 9%.

== Epidemiology ==
Shunt nephritis is a rare condition affecting males and females of all ages. It occurs in approximately 0.7-2.3% of patients with shunt infections. Approximately 12% of ventriculoatrial shunts become infected, with Staphylococcus epidermidis being the infectious agent in 75% of cases.

== History ==
Shunt nephritis was first described by Black in 1965. Early cases and most cases since then are associated with infections of shunts that connect the ventricular system of the brain to the atria of the heart (ventriculoatrial shunts). Less commonly, shunt nephritis has been reported to arise from infections of shunts connecting the ventricular system to the abdominal cavity (ventriculoperitoneal shunts).
