= Simon J. Clark =

British protein biochemist, immunologist, and academic

- Education: University of Aberdeen; University of Oxford
- Occupations: Protein biochemist, immunologist, and academic
- Scientific career
- Workplaces: University of Tübingen; University of Manchester; Complement Therapeutics
- Thesis: The glycosaminoglycan interaction properties of the complement protein factor H (2006)
- Academic advisors: Robert B. Sim; Tony Day

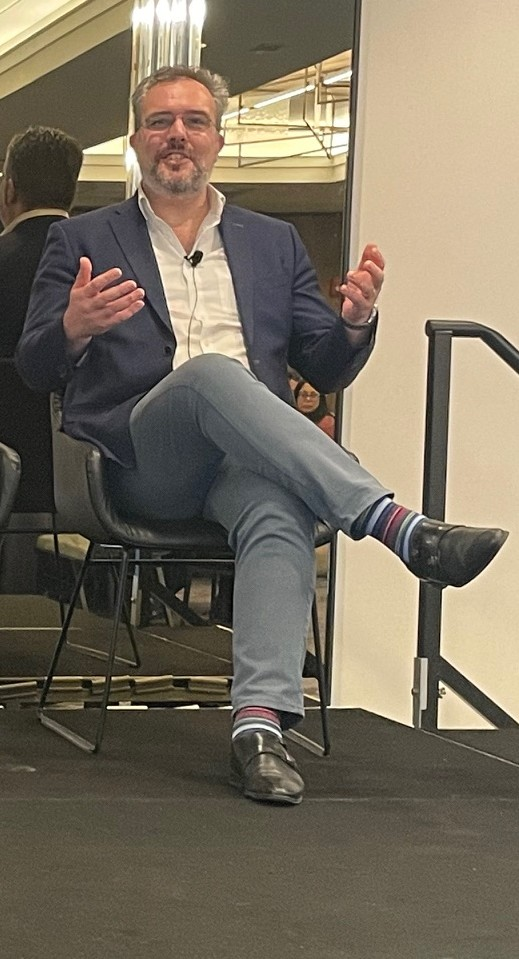
Clark in 2025, speaking at the Complement-Based Drug Development Summit, Boston

Simon J. Clark is a British protein biochemist, immunologist, and academic, most known for the study of the complement system. He is the holder of the Helmut Ecker Endowed Professorship in Age-related Macular Degeneration at the University of Tübingen, Germany, where he is the head of the Clark Lab that studies the molecular mechanisms driving ocular disease. He is an honorary professor at the University of Manchester, UK, and is a co-founder of Complement Therapeutics.

Clark's research focuses on the complement system, with an emphasis on the role of the extracellular matrix in regulating immunity and inflammation, particularly in ocular health and the blinding disease age-related macular degeneration. His work has led to multiple patents. His studies have been supported by grants from institutions such as the German Research Foundation (DFG), Fight for Sight, and the Medical Research Council (UK). In 2018, he was honored with Macular Society's Rising Star of the Year Award and in 2025 the SVAR Complement Excellence Award.

== Education and early career ==
Clark earned a BSc (Hons) in biochemistry with immunology from the University of Aberdeen in 2003, which included an industrial placement working as a developmental scientist at Axis-Shield Diagnostics, Dundee. He matriculated at Linacre College, Oxford, in September 2003 and completed his DPhil in biochemistry at the University of Oxford in 2007. He later served as a postdoctoral research associate at the University of Manchester.

== Career ==
Clark continued his academic career at the University of Manchester as a Stepping Stones Research Fellow in the Faculty of Medicine and Human Sciences from 2012 to 2013. He was awarded the Medical Research Council Career Development Fellowship in 2013, assumed the position of research fellow in the Faculty of Biology, Medicine, and Health in 2018, and has held the role of honorary professor since 2019. In the same year, he was appointed the Helmut Ecker Endowed Professor of Age-related Macular Degeneration at the University of Tübingen, where he leads the Clark Lab at the Institute for Ophthalmic Research. In 2015, together with his long-term collaborator Paul Bishop, he co-founded the Manchester Eye Tissue Repository (METR), one of Europe's largest collections of human eye material for research, which was later transferred to the University Hospital Tübingen in 2020, and renamed the Helmut Ecker Eye Tissue Resource (HEETR).

In 2021, Clark co-founded Complement Therapeutics (CTx), a spin-out company developing treatments for complement-mediated diseases, like age-related macular degeneration, based on his research findings. In September 2025 CTx gained Investigational New Drug (IND) approval by the FDA for their lead asset (termed CTx001) for the treatment of Geographic Atrophy secondary to AMD. He is also engaged with professional organizations, including serving as treasurer of the European Complement Network, a member of the executive committee of Complement UK, and a member of the expert panel of the Macular Society, while also holding the position of fund advisor at Forbion since 2023. He has been guest editor for Immunobiology since 2018, and editor for Scientific Reports since 2019.

== Research ==
Clark's research has investigated the molecular mechanisms driving age-related macular degeneration (AMD) and the role of the complement system in regulating ocular immunity and inflammation. His lab has also focused on the function of Bruch's membrane in immune homeostasis, retinal pigment epithelium (RPE) cell biology, and the identification and development of therapeutic options.

Researching the structure and function of complement factor H, Clark highlighted its role in immune regulation, its association with diseases like age-related macular degeneration (AMD), and its possible exploitation by pathogens and cancer cells to evade the immune response. In 2006, he became the first to demonstrate a biochemical consequence of a common polymorphism in complement factor H associated with increased risk of developing AMD, where a histidine residue replaces a tyrosine residue at position 384 in the mature protein (commonly referred to as the Y402H polymorphism), ultimately showing that this alters the proteins heparin-binding ability, potentially affecting complement activation and inflammation in AMD. His work further revealed that the AMD-associated 402H variant of complement factor H binds less effectively to heparan sulfate and dermatan sulfate in Bruch's membrane, potentially triggering complement overactivation and inflammation in the extracellular matrix of the eye. He subsequently discovered that factor H-like protein 1 (FHL-1) is the main complement regulator in Bruch's membrane. He and his colleagues showed that the genetics associated with increased risk of developing AMD, also lead to the increase in blood concentrations of a family of proteins called the factor H-related (FHR) proteins, and that these proteins concentrate in the back of the eye, contributing to inflammation and tissue remodeling.

Clark has filed several patents around the screening of therapeutics agents around the Y402H polymorphism and, alongside Richard Unwin and Paul Bishop, the design of polypeptides with the intention of regaining control of aberrant complement activation in inflammatory diseases.

== Awards and honors ==
- 2012 – Stepping Stones Research Fellowship, University of Manchester
- 2013 – Medical Research Council Career Development Fellowship, University of Manchester
- 2018 – Rising Star of the Year Award, Macular Society
- 2025 – SVAR Complement Excellence Award

== Selected articles ==
- Clark, S. J., Higman, V. A., Mulloy, B., Perkins, S. J., Lea, S. M., Sim, R. B., & Day, A. J. (2006). His-384 allotypic variant of factor H associated with age-related macular degeneration has different heparin binding properties from the non-disease-associated form. Journal of Biological Chemistry, 281(34), 24713–24720.
- Prosser, B. E., Johnson, S., Roversi, P., Herbert, A. P., Blaum, B. S., Tyrrell, J., ... & Lea, S. M. (2007). Structural basis for complement factor H–linked age-related macular degeneration. The Journal of Experimental Medicine, 204(10), 2277–2283.
- Orth, D., Khan, A. B., Naim, A., Grif, K., Brockmeyer, J., Karch, H., ... & Wurzner, R. (2009). Shiga toxin activates complement and binds factor H: evidence for an active role of complement in hemolytic uremic syndrome. The Journal of Immunology, 182(10), 6394–6400.
- Clark, S. J., Perveen, R., Hakobyan, S., Morgan, B. P., Sim, R. B., Bishop, P. N., & Day, A. J. (2010). Impaired binding of the age-related macular degeneration-associated complement factor H 402H allotype to Bruch's membrane in human retina. Journal of Biological Chemistry, 285(39), 30192–30202.
- Parente, R., Clark, S. J., Inforzato, A., & Day, A. J. (2017). Complement factor H in host defense and immune evasion. Cellular and Molecular Life Sciences, 74, 1605–1624.
- Keefe, D., Munye, M. M., Didangelos, A., Pisarenka, S., Chaudhuri, S., Green, R., ... & Hasan, R. (2024). Nonclinical evaluation of CTx001, a gene therapy for the treatment of geographic atrophy in age-related macular degeneration. Investigative Ophthalmology & Visual Science, 65(7), 2207-2207.
