= Factor H =

Protein found in humans

CFH
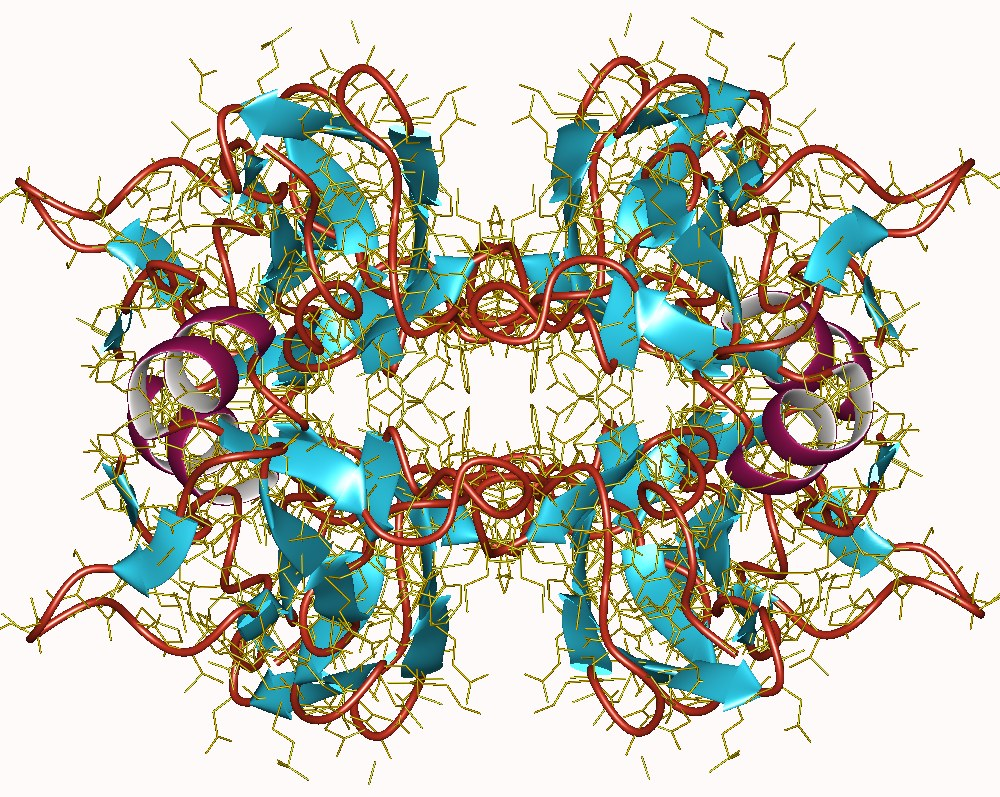

Identifiers
- Aliases: CFH, AHUS1, AMBP1, ARMD4, ARMS1, CFHL3, FH, FHL1, HF, HF1, HF2, HUS, complement factor H
- External IDs: OMIM: 134370; MGI: 88385; GeneCards: CFH
Available structures
PDB	Ortholog search: PDBe RCSB
PDB	List of PDB id codes 4ONT, 1HAQ, 1HCC, 1HFH, 1HFI, 2BZM, 2G7I, 2IC4, 2JGW, 2JGX, 2KMS, 2QFG, 2QFH, 2RLP, 2RLQ, 2UWN, 2V8E, 2W80, 2W81, 2WII, 2XQW, 3GAU, 3GAV, 3GAW, 3KXV, 3KZJ, 3OXU, 3R62, 3RJ3, 3SW0, 4AYD, 4AYE, 4AYI, 4AYM, 4B2R, 4B2S, 4J38, 4K12, 4ZH1

Gene location (Human)
Chr.	Chromosome 1 (human)
Band	1q31.3	Start	196,651,754 bp
Band	1q31.3	End	196,752,476 bp

Gene location (Mouse)
Chr.	Chromosome 1 (mouse)
Band	1 61.62 cM|1 F	Start	140,012,446 bp
Band	1 61.62 cM|1 F	End	140,111,502 bp
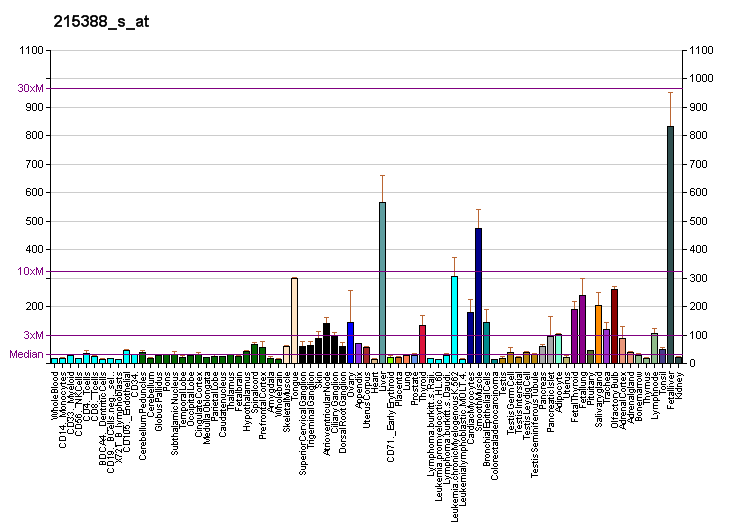

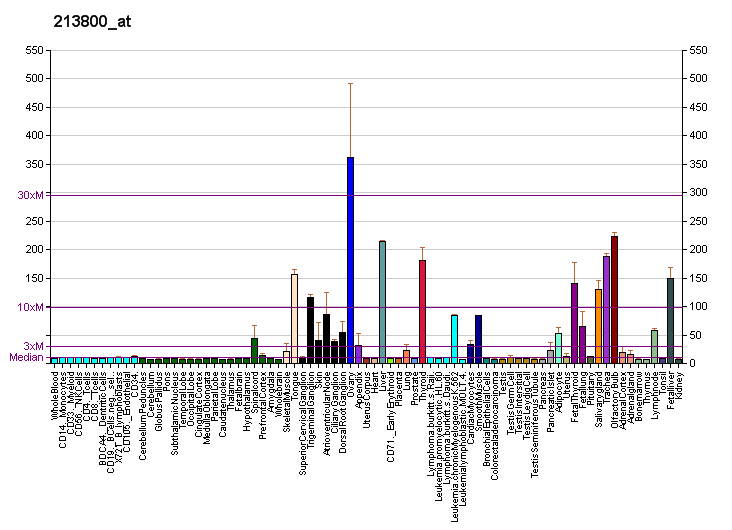
RNA expression pattern
Bgee	Human / Mouse (ortholog); Top expressed in: urethra; Achilles tendon; right coronary artery; right lobe of liver; saphenous vein; synovial joint; left coronary artery; parietal pleura; popliteal artery; gallbladder / Top expressed in: body of femur; aortic valve; aorta; vas deferens; tunica media of zone of aorta; left lobe of liver; tunica adventitia of aorta; ascending aorta; pineal gland; uterus; More reference expression data
BioGPS	More reference expression data
Gene ontology
Molecular function	heparan sulfate proteoglycan binding; heparin binding; protein binding
Cellular component	extracellular region; blood microparticle; extracellular exosome; extracellular space
Biological process	complement activation, alternative pathway; regulation of complement activation; immune system process; innate immune response; complement activation; viral process; regulation of complement-dependent cytotoxicity
Sources:Amigo / QuickGO
Orthologs
Databases	NCBI: entry; OMA: entry
Species	Human	Mouse
Entrez	3075	12628
Ensembl	ENSG00000000971	ENSMUSG00000026365
UniProt	P08603	P06909
RefSeq (mRNA)	NM_001014975; NM_000186	NM_009888
RefSeq (protein)	NP_000177; NP_001014975	NP_034018
Location (UCSC)	Chr 1: 196.65 – 196.75 Mb	Chr 1: 140.01 – 140.11 Mb
PubMed search
- Wikidata
View/Edit Human	View/Edit Mouse

Factor H (FH) is a soluble glycoprotein and a member of the regulators of complement activation (RCA) family. It functions as a complement control protein and plays a critical role in regulating the complement system, particularly the alternative pathway. Factor H is a large molecule with a molecular weight of approximately 155 kilodaltons and circulates in human blood plasma at concentrations typically ranging from 200–300 micrograms per milliliter.

== Structure ==
The molecule is made up of 20 complement control protein (CCP) modules (also referred to as Short Consensus Repeats or sushi domains) connected to one another by short linkers (of between three and eight amino acid residues) and arranged in an extended head to tail fashion. Each of the CCP modules consists of around 60 amino acids with four cysteine residues disulfide bonded in a 1–3 2–4 arrangement, and a hydrophobic core built around an almost invariant tryptophan residue. The CCP modules are numbered from 1–20 (from the N-terminus of the protein); CCPs 1–4 and CCPs 19–20 engage with C3b while CCPs 7 and CCPs 19–20 bind to GAGs and sialic acid. To date atomic structures have been determined for CCPs 1–3, CCP 5, CCP 7, CCPs 10–11 and CCPs 11–12, CCPs 12–13, CCP 15, CCP 16, CCPs 15–16, CCPs 18–20, and CCPs 19–20. The atomic structure for CCPs 6–8 bound to the GAG mimic sucrose octasulfate, CCPs 1–4 in complex with C3b and CCPs 19–20 in complex with C3d (that corresponds to the thioester domain of C3b) have also been determined. Although an atomic resolution structure for intact factor H has not yet been determined, low resolution techniques indicate that it may be bent back in solution. Information available to date indicates that CCP modules 1–4 is responsible for the cofactor and decay acceleration activities of factor H, whereas self/non-self discrimination occurs predominantly through GAG binding to CCP modules 7 and/or GAG or sialic acid binding to 19–20.

== Function ==
The principal role of Factor H is to regulate the alternative pathway of the complement system, a key component of innate immunity. It ensures that complement activation is directed against pathogens or abnormal surfaces, while preventing damage to host tissues. This is accomplished through two main mechanisms: serving as a cofactor for Factor I-mediated cleavage of C3b, and accelerating the decay of the alternative pathway C3-convertase, C3bBb.

Factor H selectively exerts its regulatory activity on self cells and surfaces, but not on the surfaces of bacteria or viruses. However, some pathogens, such as Neisseria meningitidis (the meningococcus), have evolved mechanisms to bind human FH, thereby evading complement-mediated destruction. This interaction enables the bacteria to survive and proliferate in the bloodstream, contributing to invasive disease.

The ability of Factor H to protect self surfaces is believed to depend on its capacity to adopt different conformational states, each associated with varying levels of cofactor and decay-accelerating activity. In solution, FH predominantly exists in a low-activity conformation sufficient to regulate complement in the fluid phase. Upon binding to glycosaminoglycans (GAGs) or sialic acids—molecules typically found on host cells—FH undergoes conformational changes that enhance its regulatory function. This mechanism ensures that complement activation is inhibited on self surfaces while proceeding unimpeded on foreign cells.

== Clinical significance ==
Due to the central role that factor H plays in the regulation of complement, there are a number of clinical implications arising from aberrant factor H activity. Overactive factor H may result in reduced complement activity on pathogenic cells – increasing susceptibility to microbial infections. Underactive factor H may result in increased complement activity on healthy host cells – resulting in autoimmune diseases. It is not surprising, therefore, that rare mutations or common single nucleotide polymorphisms (SNPs) in the complement factor H gene (CFH) often result in pathologies. Moreover, the complement inhibitory activities of factor H, and other complement regulators, are often used by pathogens to increase virulence.

=== Age-related macular degeneration ===
In 2005, several independent research groups identified an SNP in CFH, which results in the protein change p.Y402H, as a risk factor for Age Related Macular Degeneration (AMD) present in around a third of Europeans. Although its allele frequency varies considerably between different populations, Y402H has been consistently associated with AMD onset and progression. Homozygous individuals have an approximately seven-fold greater odds of association with AMD while heterozygotes have a two-to-three-fold greater odds of association with the disease. This SNP, located in CCP module 7 of factor H, has been shown to affect the ability of factor H protein to localise to sites of inflammation in retinal tissues (e.g. by polyanions and pentraxins) and to regulate the activation of complement and immune cells. The SNP has also been shown to affect the function of factor H-like protein 1, an alternatively spliced version of factor H consisting of CCPs 1 to 7 only, which is thought to have a greater role in intraocular complement regulation. The British complementologist, Simon J. Clark demonstrated that FHL-1 was the predominant form of FH protecting Bruch's membrane, an integral part of the outer Blood-retinal barrier and a major site of early AMD. Further studies suggested that haploinsufficiency of FHL-1 lead to the manifestation of an AMD-like disease at a significantly earlier age. However, the genetic variants in CFH with the greatest effect on an individual's risk of AMD have been shown to affect CCPs 1 to 4, which are involved in dampening the effects of the alternative pathway of complement. A rare functional coding change, p.R1210C, in CFH results in a functional deficiency in factor H and leads to a substantially higher risk of macular degeneration as well as complement-mediated renal conditions.

Variation in other genes of the regulators of complement activation locus, such as complement factor H-related genes, as well as in other complement proteins (e.g. factor I, C2/factor B, and C3) have also been associated with greater AMD risk. The current theory is that complement dysregulation is a key driver of chronic inflammation in AMD.

==== Therapeutic target ====
Gemini Therapeutics Inc. was a Massachusetts based precision medicine company focused on the development of new therapies through a deeper understanding of disease. Based on the biological activity of human factor H, Gemini was developing a recombinant human factor H protein, GEM103, for the treatment of dry AMD. GEM-103 was evaluated in phase I (NCT04246866) and II (NCT04643886) clinical trials in AMD patients, but failed to achieve its clinical end points and the developmental program was terminated Gemini Therapeutics merged with Disc Medicine in 2022

Other companies currently focusing on developing FH, FHL-1, or variations thereof, as therapeutics for treating AMD, include Character Biosciences Inc, and 4D Molecular Therapeutics

=== Atypical hemolytic uremic syndrome ===
Hemolytic uremic syndrome (HUS) is a disease associated with microangiopathic hemolytic anemia, thrombocytopenia, and acute renal failure. It can be either acquired (e.g. following infection with shigatoxigenic Escherichia coli), or inherited (also known as atypical hemolytic uremic syndrome, aHUS). aHUS has been strongly linked to mutations in genes of the complement system, especially factor H. In contrast to AMD and C3 glomerulopathy (another complement-mediated renal disorder) which are mainly associated with variation in the N-terminus (CCPs 1 to 4), predisposing mutations in factor H mainly affect the C-terminus of the protein (CCP modules 19 and 20), which has been shown to be responsible for adherence to renal tissues and the regulation of complement components and their downstream effectors.

=== Schizophrenia ===
Alterations in the immune response are involved in pathogenesis of many neuropsychiatric disorders including schizophrenia. Recent studies indicated alterations in the complement system, including those which may result in the overactivation of the alternative complement pathway, may predispose to schizophrenia. For example, the CFH SNP rs424535 (2783-526T>A) was positively associated with schizophrenia.

=== Ischemic stroke ===
It was found that rs800292(184G >A) SNP was positively associated with stroke and rs800912 minor allele of the CFH gene might be considered as a risk factor for ischemic stroke.

=== Recruitment by pathogens ===
Given the central role of factor H in protecting cells from complement, it is not surprising that several important human pathogens have evolved mechanisms for recruiting factor H. This recruitment of factor H by pathogens provides significant resistance to complement attack, and therefore increased virulence. Pathogens that have been shown to recruit factor H include: Aspergillus spp.; Borrelia burgdorferi; B. duttonii; B. recurrentis; Candida albicans; Francisella tularensis; Haemophilus influenzae; Neisseria gonorrhoeae; N. meningitidis; Streptococcus pneumoniae; and Streptococcus pyogenes.

The Gram-negative bacterium B. burgdorferi has five factor H–binding proteins: CRASP-1, CRASP-2, CRASP-3, CRASP-4 and CRASP-5. Each CRASP protein also binds plasminogen. It is possible that the allele frequency of CFH variants across the globe reflects selective pressure from infectious diseases.

== Interactions ==
Factor H has been shown to interact with complement component 3, amongst other complement proteins and factors, leading to regulation of the alternative pathway of complement in particular.

== Recombinant production ==
Biologically active Factor H has been produced by Ralf Reski and coworkers in the moss bioreactor, in a process called molecular farming. Large quantities of biologically active human Factor H, potentially suitable for therapeutic purposes, were produced using a synthetic codon-optimised gene expressed in the yeast expression host, Pichia pastoris.
