= Autoimmune heart disease =

- Specialty: Rheumatology, cardiology, cardio-rheumatology

Autoimmune heart diseases are the effects of the body's own immune defense system mistaking cardiac antigens as foreign and attacking them leading to inflammation of the heart as a whole, or in parts. The commonest form of autoimmune heart disease is rheumatic heart disease or rheumatic fever.

== Cause ==
Aetiologically, these are most commonly seen in children with a history of sore throat caused by a streptococcal infection. This is similar to the post-streptococcal glomerulonephritis. Here, the anti-bacterial antibodies cross react with the heart antigens causing inflammation.

Inflammatory damage leads to the following:

- Pericarditis - Here the pericardium gets inflamed. Acutely, it can cause pericardial effusion leading to cardiac tamponade and death. After healing, there may be fibrosis and adhesion of the pericardium with the heart leading to constriction of the heart and reduced cardiac function.
- Myocarditis - Here the muscle bulk of the heart gets inflamed. Inflamed muscles have reduced functional capacity. This may be fatal, if left untreated as is in a case of pancarditis. On healing, there will be fibrosis and reduced functional capacity.
- Endocarditis - Here the inner lining of the heart is inflamed, including the heart valves. This may cause a valve prolapse, adhesion of the adjacent cusps of these valves and occlusion of the flow tracts of blood through the heart causing diseases called valve stenosis.

== Mechanism ==
These are the typical mechanisms of autoimmunity. Autoantibodies or auto-toxic T-lymphocyte mediated tissue destruction. The process is aided by neutrophils, the complement system, tumor necrosis factor alpha, interleukin-6 etc. Persistent inflammation may lead to fibrosis, scarring, and loss of normal cardiac architecture.

== Types ==
These depend on the amount of inflammation. These are covered in their relevant articles.

- Acute - Heart failure; pericardial effusion; etc.
- Chronic - Valve diseases as noted above; Reduced cardiac output; Exercise intolerance.

== Diagnosis ==
- Echocardiography - Detects pericardial effusion, valve abnormalities, or reduced cardiac function.
- Electrocardiogram (ECG) - Identifies arrhythmias or conduction abnormalities in myocarditis or pericarditis.
- Blood tests - Elevated inflammatory markers (e.g., C-reactive protein, erythrocyte sedimentation rate) and anti-streptolysin O (ASO) titers in rheumatic heart disease.
- Cardiac MRI - Assesses myocardial inflammation or fibrosis in myocarditis.
- Cardiac biopsy
- Jones criteria - Used to diagnose rheumatic fever, based on major (e.g., carditis, polyarthritis) and minor criteria (e.g., fever, elevated inflammatory markers), supported by evidence of prior streptococcal infection.

Signs in cardiac imaging typically are focal fibrosis, wall motion changes, oedema, larger cavity dimensions of the left ventricle, small blood vessel abnormalities where potential necrotizing vasculitis or thrombi are occurring.

== Treatment ==
Intensive cardiac care and immunosuppressives including corticosteroids are helpful in the acute stage of the disease. Colchicine can also be used to help prevent recurrences in Pericarditis.

When the condition becomes chronic, treatment can include debility control and supportive care.
