= Acylation stimulating protein =

Protein in humans

Complement 3 (C3) through its interaction with factors B and D (adipsin) generates C3a. In the human body, C3a is rapidly cleaved by carboxypeptidase B or carbxyopeptidase N, that remove the carboxyl-terminal arginine to generate C3adesArg. Thus, most of plasmatic C3a is present in C3adesArg form. C3adesArg is more commonly named ASP or acylation-stimulating-protein due to its marked stimulating action on triacylglycerol synthesis in human adipocytes and skin fibroblasts. ASP is also known for its augmentation of glucose transport and inhibiting action on hormone-sensitive lipase. Because of these actions, it is linked to the pathogenesis of obesity, having been demonstrated to be present at increased levels in patients with obesity, diabetes mellitus type 2 and coronary artery disease.

ASP lis a ligand for C5L2, a G-protein-coupled receptor.

The view of C3a/C3adesArg as an acylation stimulating activity is not universally accepted. The evidence is discussed in a recent review.
