= C3a receptor =

Protein-coding gene in humans

C3AR1

Identifiers
- Aliases: C3AR1, AZ3B, C3AR, HNFAG09, complement component 3a receptor 1, complement C3a receptor 1
- External IDs: OMIM: 605246; MGI: 1097680; GeneCards: C3AR1

Gene location (Human)
| Chr. | Chromosome 12 (human) |
| Band | 12p13.31 | Start | 8,056,844 bp |
| Band | 12p13.31 | End | 8,066,359 bp |

Gene location (Mouse)
| Chr. | Chromosome 6 (mouse) |
| Band | 6|6 F2 | Start | 122,824,097 bp |
| Band | 6|6 F2 | End | 122,833,120 bp |
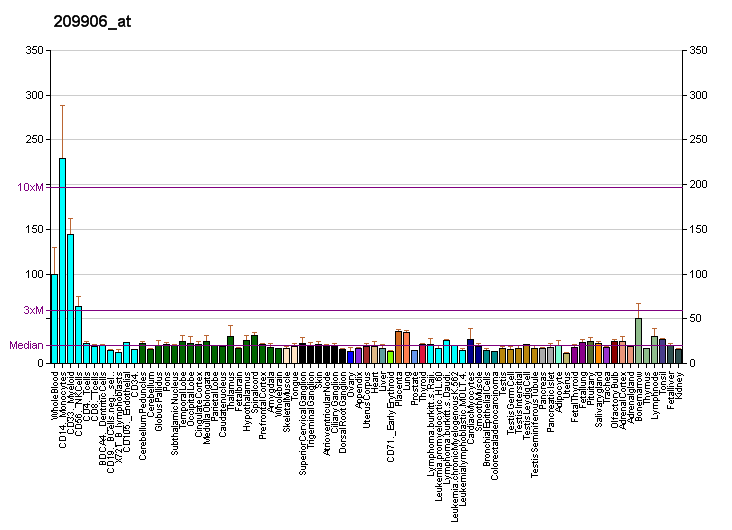
RNA expression pattern
| Bgee | Human / Mouse (ortholog); Top expressed in: monocyte; trabecular bone; decidua; amniotic fluid; bone marrow; blood; appendix; lower lobe of lung; bone marrow cell; superficial temporal artery / Top expressed in: stroma of bone marrow; calvaria; ankle joint; ankle; lumbar subsegment of spinal cord; internal carotid artery; external carotid artery; sciatic nerve; white adipose tissue; carotid body; More reference expression data |
| BioGPS | More reference expression data |
Gene ontology
| Molecular function | signal transducer activity; complement receptor activity; complement component C3a receptor activity; G protein-coupled receptor activity |
| Cellular component | integral component of membrane; integral component of plasma membrane; membrane; plasma membrane; azurophil granule membrane; specific granule membrane |
| Biological process | blood circulation; signal transduction; chemotaxis; positive regulation of neutrophil chemotaxis; positive regulation of angiogenesis; positive regulation of macrophage chemotaxis; inflammatory response; positive regulation of vascular endothelial growth factor production; G protein-coupled receptor signaling pathway; regulation of complement activation; phospholipase C-activating G protein-coupled receptor signaling pathway; neutrophil degranulation; leukocyte migration; cell chemotaxis; complement receptor mediated signaling pathway; positive regulation of cytosolic calcium ion concentration; positive regulation of cytosolic calcium ion concentration involved in phospholipase C-activating G protein-coupled signaling pathway |
Sources:Amigo / QuickGO
Orthologs
| Databases | NCBI: entry; OMA: entry |
| Species | Human | Mouse |
| Entrez | 719 | 12267 |
| Ensembl | ENSG00000171860 | ENSMUSG00000040552 |
| UniProt | Q16581 | O09047 |
| RefSeq (mRNA) | NM_004054; NM_001326475; NM_001326477 | NM_009779 |
| RefSeq (protein) | NP_001313404; NP_001313406; NP_004045 | NP_033909 |
| Location (UCSC) | Chr 12: 8.06 – 8.07 Mb | Chr 6: 122.82 – 122.83 Mb |
| PubMed search |
- Wikidata
| View/Edit Human | View/Edit Mouse |

The C3a receptor also known as complement component 3a receptor 1 (C3AR1) is a G protein-coupled receptor protein involved in the complement system.

The receptor binds to complement component C3a, although there is limited evidence that this receptor also binds C4a in lesser mammals. This has yet to be proven true in humans. C3a receptor modulates immunity, arthritis, diet-induced obesity and cancers.

== Agonists and antagonists ==
Potent and selective agonists and antagonists for C3aR have been discovered.
