= Complement component 5a =

Protein fragment

complement component 5
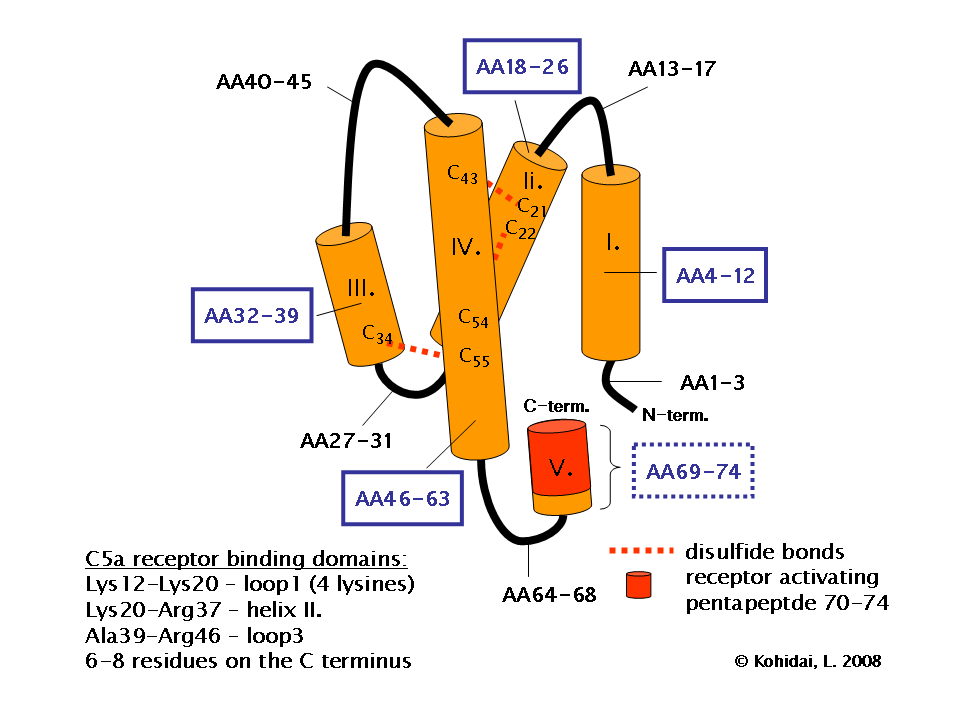
- Schematic representation of three-dimensional structure of complement 5a

Identifiers
- Symbol: C5
- NCBI gene: 727
- HGNC: 1331
- OMIM: 120900
- RefSeq: NM_001735
- UniProt: P01031

Other data
- Locus: Chr. 9 q34.1
Search for
- Structures: Swiss-model
- Domains: InterPro

C5a is a protein fragment released from cleavage of complement component C5 by protease C5-convertase into C5a and C5b fragments. C5b is important in late events of the complement cascade, an orderly series of reactions which coordinates several basic defense mechanisms, including formation of the membrane attack complex (MAC), one of the most basic weapons of the innate immune system, formed as an automatic response to intrusions from foreign particles and microbial invaders. It essentially pokes microscopic pinholes in these foreign objects, causing loss of water and sometimes death. C5a, the other cleavage product of C5, acts as a highly inflammatory peptide, encouraging complement activation, formation of the MAC, attraction of innate immune cells, and histamine release involved in allergic responses. The origin of C5 is in the hepatocyte, but its synthesis can also be found in macrophages, where it may cause local increase of C5a. C5a is a chemotactic agent and an anaphylatoxin; it is essential in the innate immunity but it is also linked with the adaptive immunity. The increased production of C5a is connected with a number of inflammatory diseases.

== Structure ==
Human polypeptide C5a contains 74 amino acids and has 11kDa. NMR spectroscopy proved that the molecule is composed of four helices and connected by peptide loops with three disulphide bonds between helix IV and II, III. There is a short 1.5 turn helix on N-terminus but all agonist activity take place in the C-terminus. C5a is rapidly metabolised by a serum enzyme carboxypeptidase B to a 72 amino acid form C5a des-Arg without C terminal arginine.

== Functions ==
C5a is an anaphylatoxin, causing increased expression of adhesion molecules on endothelium, contraction of smooth muscle, and increased vascular permeability. C5a des-Arg is a much less potent anaphylatoxin. Both C5a and C5a des-Arg can trigger mast cell degranulation, releasing proinflammatory molecules histamine and TNF-α. C5a is also an effective chemoattractant, initiating accumulation of complement and phagocytic cells at sites of infection or recruitment of antigen-presenting cells to lymph nodes. C5a plays a key role in increasing migration and adherence of neutrophils and monocytes to vessel walls. White blood cells are activated by upregulation of integrin avidity, the lipoxygenase pathway and arachidonic acid metabolism. C5a also modulates the balance between activating versus inhibitory IgG Fc receptors on leukocytes, thereby enhancing the autoimmune response.

== Binding process ==
C5a interact with receptor protein C5a Receptor 1 (C5aR1) on the surface of target cells such as macrophages, neutrophils and endothelial cells. C5aR1 is a member of the G-protein-coupled receptor superfamily of proteins, predicted to have seven transmembrane helical domains of largely hydrophobic amino acid residues, forming three intra- and three extra-cellular loops, with an extracellular N-terminus and an intracellular C-terminus.

C5a binding to the receptor is a two-stage process: an interaction between basic residues in the helical core of C5a and acidic residues in the extracellular N-terminal domain allows the C-terminus of C5a to bind to residues in the receptor transmembrane domains. The latter interaction leads to receptor activation, and the transduction of the ligand binding signal across the cell plasma membrane to the cytoplasmic G protein G_{i} type GNAI2.

Sensitivity of C5aR1 to C5a stimulation is enhanced by lipopolysaccharides exposure. C5a, acting via C5aR1, is shown to differentially modulate lipopolysaccharides-induced inflammatory responses in primary human monocytes versus macrophages, yet this is not due to C5aR1 upregulation. C5L2 is another C5a receptor that is thought to regulate the C5a-C5aR1 effects. There is apparently contradictory evidence showing decoy receptor activity conferring anti-inflammatory properties and also signalling activity conferring pro-inflammatory properties.

== Diseases ==
C5a is a powerful inflammatory mediator, and seems to be a key factor in the development of pathology of many inflammatory diseases involving the complement system such as sepsis, rheumatoid arthritis, inflammatory bowel disease, systemic lupus erythemotosis, psoriasis. The inhibitor of C5a that can block its effects would be helpful in medical applications. Another candidate is PMX53 or PMX205 that is highly specific for CD88 and effectively reduces inflammatory response. C5a has been identified as a key mediator of neutrophil dysfunction in sepsis, with antibody blockade of C5a improving outcomes in experimental models. This has also been shown in humans, with C5a-mediated neutrophil dysfunction predicting subsequent nosocomial infection and death from sepsis. Recent data demonstrates that C5a not only impairs phagocytosis by neutrophils but also impairs phagosomal maturation, inducing a marked alteration in the neutrophil phosphoproteomic response to bacterial targets. C5a binding to C5aR1 and C5aR2 (C5L2) mediates the formation of neutrophil extracellular traps and release of cytotoxic histones to the extracellular space, which is believed to act as a pathogenetic process of acute respiratory distress syndrome (ARDS) and promote tumor growth and metastasis.
