= Complement component 3b =

Part of the innate immune system

The classical and alternative complement pathways.

C3b is the larger of two elements formed by the cleavage of complement component 3, and is considered an important part of the innate immune system. C3b is potent in opsonization: tagging pathogens, immune complexes (antigen-antibody), and apoptotic cells for phagocytosis. Additionally, C3b plays a role in forming a C3 convertase when bound to Factor B (C3bBb complex), or a C5 convertase when bound to C4b and C2b (C4b2b3b complex) or when an additional C3b molecule binds to the C3bBb complex (C3bBb3b complex).

C3b's ability to perform these important functions derives from its ability to covalently bind to the surface of invading pathogens within an organism's body. The cleavage of C3 leaves C3b with an exposed thioester bond, allowing C3b to effectively coat and tag foreign cells by covalently binding to hydroxyl (-OH) and amine (-NH2) groups on foreign cell surfaces.

This cleavage can occur via three mechanisms (classical pathway, alternative pathway and lectin pathway) that ultimately lead to the formation of a C3 convertase. Formation of a C3 convertase functions as a positive feedback loop, so as more C3b is cleaved, more C3 convertases are formed, further amplifying the signal on the surface of the microbial invader. This amplification of signal serves as a powerful tool for the immune system in effective clearance of the invading pathogen.

== C3 convertase ==
=== Classical pathway ===
In the classical pathway, the microbial pathogen is coated in antibodies (IgG and IgM) released by B cells. The C1 complement complex binds to these antibodies resulting in its activation via cross proteolysis. This activated C1 complex cleaves C4 and C2 forming a C4bC2b complex that covalently bonds to the surface of the microbe and functions as a C3 convertase, binding and cleaving C3 into C3a and C3b. Binding of a C3b molecule to the C4bC2b complex (C4b2b3b) results in the formation of a C5 convertase, which cleaves C5 into C5a and C5b. C5b associates with C6, C7, C8, and C9, all of which form a complex that results in a pore through the pathogen's membrane. This pore disrupts the ionic and osmotic balance provided by the pathogen's membrane, and leads to the death of the pathogen cell.

=== Alternative pathway ===
In the alternative pathway, C3, present in the blood stream, spontaneously cleaves at low rates into C3b and C3a. If a microbe is present, the C3b component will covalently bind to the surface of foreign invader. It then associates with Factor B, which is cleaved by Factor D into Factor Bb. This C3bBb convertase is stabilized by properdin (Factor P) preferentially on microbial surfaces over normal host surfaces, and is now able to cleave many more C3 molecules thus amplifying the signal. Incorporation of an additional C3b into the C3bBb C3 convertase leads to the formation of C3Bb3b C5 convertase.

== Opsonization and pathogen clearance ==
Once cleaved C3b can either generate C3 or C5 convertases, as mentioned above, or else covalently bind to the microbial surface, tagging the cell for phagocytosis in a process known as opsonization. Additionally, C3b molecules can attach to the Fc regions of antigen-bound antibodies leading to phagocytosis or movement to the liver, where the C3b-tagged immune complex is then destroyed. In both cases C3b interacts with the C3b receptor, complement receptor 1 on phagocytic cells, such as macrophages and neutrophils, allowing for engulfment of the pathogen. Furthermore, erythrocytes with Cr1 on their surface bind and deliver the immune complexes to the mononuclear phagocyte system via interactions with C3b.

== Regulation ==
The key to the success of the complement system in clearing antigens is regulating the effects of C3b to pathogens alone and not healthy, host cells. This is done through several different mechanisms. One mechanism, mentioned above, is the stabilization of the C3bBb convertase by properdin preferentially on microbial surfaces, not on host surfaces, a step necessary for formation of a functional C3 convertase. Furthermore, if C3b does bind to a host-cell surface, regulators of complement activity (RCAs), a group of genetically-, structurally-, and functionally-related proteins, inactivate the complement component. Given the C3 is constantly being turned over in the alternative pathway and its ability to rapidly amplify a signal, these proteins are important in regulating the temporal and spatial effects of C3b to infected tissues. An example RCA is membrane cofactor protein (MCP; CD46), which is ubiquitously expressed and plays a critical role in protecting host cells from damage by the C3b. Furthermore, host cells express p33 (globular C1q receptor) on the surface, which binds C1q, and prevents it from initiating complement activation.

== Clinical significance ==
Due to the importance of C3b, disruptions resulting in deficiencies or up regulation of C3b generation can have serious implications for human health. For example, the uncontrolled cleavage of C3b is associated with the disease C3 glomerulopathy, in which deposits of C3 in the glomeruli disrupt kidney function and can eventually result in kidney failure.

Patients with diseases associated with elevated levels of immune complexes such as systemic lupus erythematosus, leprosy, and AIDS are found to have significantly decreased levels of the C3b receptor, Cr1, expression on erythrocytes, as well as altered expression of Cr1 on neutrophils in response to stimulation. Healthy neutrophils increase their Cr1 expression tenfold in response to chemoattractant peptides. However, patients with diseases such as AIDS do not display this response to stimulation, which results in reduced phagocytosis by the neutrophils and likely plays a critical role in disease progression.

The absence of regulatory proteins, resulting in excessive C3 activation and C3b formation, is associated with diseases such as atypical hemolytic uremic syndrome (aHUS), hemolytic disorders, and certain autoimmune disorders. In such cases treatment with the complement-inhibitory anti-C5 monoclonal antibody, eculizumab, is found to be highly effective.

== See also ==
- C3a - the other fragment C3 is cleaved into along with C3b
