= C5a receptor =

Mammalian protein found in Homo sapiens

C5AR1

Identifiers
- Aliases: C5AR1, C5A, C5AR, C5R1, CD88, complement component 5a receptor 1, C5a receptor, complement C5a receptor 1
- External IDs: OMIM: 113995; MGI: 88232; GeneCards: C5AR1

Gene location (Human)
Chr.	Chromosome 19 (human)
Band	19q13.32	Start	47,290,023 bp
Band	19q13.32	End	47,322,066 bp

Gene location (Mouse)
Chr.	Chromosome 7 (mouse)
Band	7 A2|7 8.77 cM	Start	15,980,668 bp
Band	7 A2|7 8.77 cM	End	15,993,465 bp
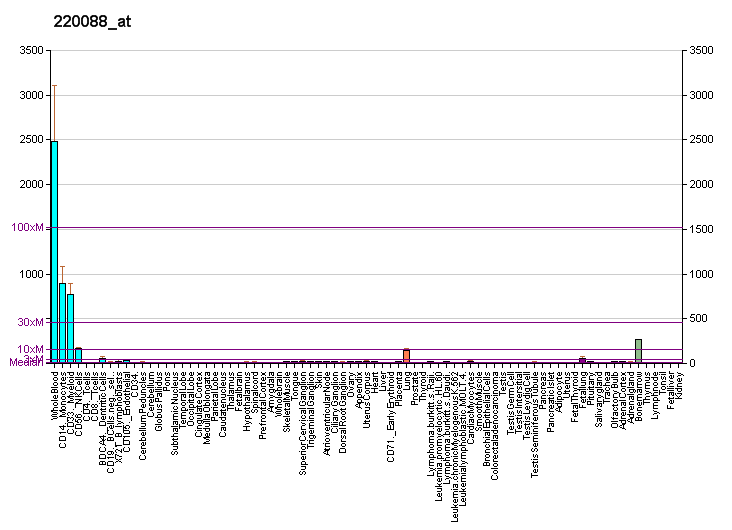
RNA expression pattern
Bgee	Human / Mouse (ortholog); Top expressed in: blood; monocyte; bone marrow; granulocyte; bone marrow cell; pituitary gland; right lung; anterior pituitary; periodontal fiber; upper lobe of left lung / Top expressed in: granulocyte; aortic valve; stroma of bone marrow; ascending aorta; blood; tibiofemoral joint; lumbar spinal ganglion; ankle; choroid plexus of fourth ventricle; right lung lobe; More reference expression data
BioGPS	More reference expression data
Gene ontology
Molecular function	complement component C5a binding; signal transducer activity; complement receptor activity; complement component C5a receptor activity; G protein-coupled receptor activity
Cellular component	integral component of membrane; membrane; plasma membrane; apical part of cell; integral component of plasma membrane; cell surface; basolateral plasma membrane; cytoplasmic vesicle; secretory granule membrane
Biological process	negative regulation of neuron apoptotic process; positive regulation of epithelial cell proliferation; mRNA transcription by RNA polymerase II; activation of phospholipase C activity; neutrophil chemotaxis; positive regulation of angiogenesis; chemotaxis; cellular defense response; response to lipopolysaccharide; animal organ regeneration; immune response; response to peptidoglycan; positive regulation of ERK1 and ERK2 cascade; positive regulation of neutrophil chemotaxis; complement receptor mediated signaling pathway; sensory perception of chemical stimulus; positive regulation of vascular endothelial growth factor production; cell proliferation in hindbrain; positive regulation of macrophage chemotaxis; signal transduction; defense response to Gram-positive bacterium; apoptotic process; regulation of complement activation; inflammatory response; phospholipase C-activating G protein-coupled receptor signaling pathway; neutrophil degranulation; leukocyte migration; cell chemotaxis; positive regulation of cytosolic calcium ion concentration; G protein-coupled receptor signaling pathway; complement component C5a signaling pathway; cognition; regulation of astrocyte activation; presynapse organization; regulation of amyloid-beta clearance; regulation of tau-protein kinase activity; regulation of microglial cell activation
Sources:Amigo / QuickGO
Orthologs
Databases	NCBI: entry; OMA: entry
Species	Human	Mouse
Entrez	728	12273
Ensembl	ENSG00000197405	ENSMUSG00000049130
UniProt	P21730	P30993
RefSeq (mRNA)	NM_001736	NM_001173550; NM_007577
RefSeq (protein)	NP_001727	NP_001167021; NP_031603
Location (UCSC)	Chr 19: 47.29 – 47.32 Mb	Chr 7: 15.98 – 15.99 Mb
PubMed search
- Wikidata
View/Edit Human	View/Edit Mouse

The C5a receptor also known as complement component 5a receptor 1 (C5AR1) or CD88 (Cluster of Differentiation 88) is a G protein-coupled receptor for C5a. It functions as a complement receptor. C5a receptor 1 modulates inflammatory responses, obesity, development and cancers. From a signaling transduction perspective, C5a receptor 1 activation is implicated in β-arrestin2 recruitment via Rab5a, coupling of Gαi proteins, ERK1/2 phosphorylation, calcium mobilization and Rho activation leading to downstream functions, such as secretion of cytokines, chemotaxis, and phagocytosis.

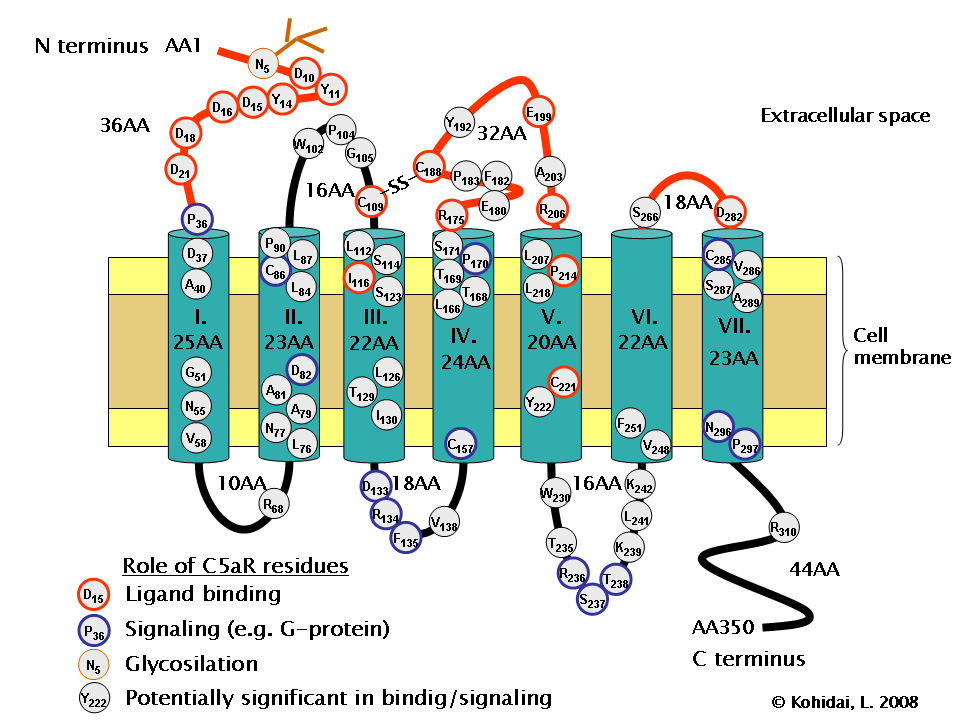
C5a receptor structure and its residues possessing role in ligand binding or signaling.

== Cells ==
The C5a receptor 1 is expressed on:

- Granulocytes
- Macrophages
- Basophils
- Eosinophils
- Monocytes
- Neutrophils
- Dendritic cells
- Hepatoma-derived cell line HepG2
- Astrocytes
- Microglia

== Agonist and antagonists ==
Potent and selective agonist and antagonists for C5a receptor 1 have been developed.

== Clinical significance ==
C5a receptor 1 (C5AR1) has been implicated in the pathogenesis of several inflammatory and immune-mediated disorders through its role in neutrophil recruitment and activation.

In dermatological diseases, increased C5AR1 signaling has been associated with neutrophil-driven inflammation in hidradenitis suppurativa and chronic spontaneous urticaria.

In renal disease, activation of the C5a–C5AR1 pathway has been implicated in lupus nephritis and C3 glomerulopathy.

Experimental studies have also implicated C5AR1 signaling in neuroinflammatory processes, including central nervous system manifestations of systemic lupus erythematosus and microglial activation in neurodegenerative disease models.

C5AR1 has also been investigated in cancer biology, where it has been associated with the recruitment of immunosuppressive myeloid cells within the tumor microenvironment. Consequently, C5AR1 has been studied as a potential target for combination cancer immunotherapy.

== See also ==
- Complement component 5a for binding mechanism
