= Opsonin =

Type of immune system molecule

Opsonins are extracellular proteins that, when bound to substances or cells, induce phagocytes to phagocytose the substances or cells with the opsonins bound. Thus, opsonins act as tags to label things in the body that should be phagocytosed (i.e. eaten) by phagocytes (cells that specialise in phagocytosis, i.e. cellular eating). Different types of things ("targets") can be tagged by opsonins for phagocytosis, including: pathogens (such as bacteria), cancer cells, aged cells, dead or dying cells (such as apoptotic cells), excess synapses, or protein aggregates (such as amyloid plaques). Opsonins help clear pathogens, as well as dead, dying and diseased cells.

Opsonins were discovered and named "opsonins" in 1904 by Almroth Wright and Stewart Ranken Douglas, who found that incubating bacteria with blood plasma enabled phagocytes to phagocytose (and thereby destroy) the bacteria. They concluded that: "We have here conclusive proof that the blood fluids modify the bacteria in a manner which renders them a ready prey to the phagocytes. We may speak of this as an "opsonic" effect (opsono - I cater for; I prepare victuals for), and we may employ the term "opsonins" to designate the elements in the blood fluids which produce this effect."

Subsequent research found two main types of opsonin in blood that opsonised bacteria: complement proteins and antibodies. However, there are now known to be at least 50 proteins that act as opsonins for pathogens or other targets.

== Mechanisms ==
Opsonins induce phagocytosis of targets by binding the targets (e.g. bacteria) and then also binding phagocytic receptors on phagocytes. Thus, opsonins act as bridging molecules between the target and the phagocyte, bringing them into contact, and then usually activating the phagocytic receptor to induce engulfment of the target by the phagocyte.

All cell membranes have negative charges (zeta potential) which makes it difficult for two cells to come close together. When opsonins bind to their targets they boost the kinetics of phagocytosis by favoring interaction between the opsonin and cell surface receptors on immune cells. This overrides the negative charges from cell membranes.

It is important that opsonins do not tag healthy, non-pathogenic cells for phagocytosis, as phagocytosis results in digestion and thus destruction of targets. Therefore, some opsonins (including some complement proteins) have evolved to bind pathogen-associated molecular patterns (PAMP), molecules only found on the surface of pathogens, enabling phagocytosis of these pathogens, and thus innate immunity. Antibodies bind to antigens on the pathogen surface, enabling adaptive immunity. Opsonins that opsonise host body cells (e.g. GAS6 that opsonises apoptotic cells) bind to "eat-me" signals (such as phosphatidylserine) exposed by dead, dying or stressed cells.

== Types ==
Opsonins are related to the two types of immune systems: the adaptive immune system and the innate immune system.

=== Adaptive ===
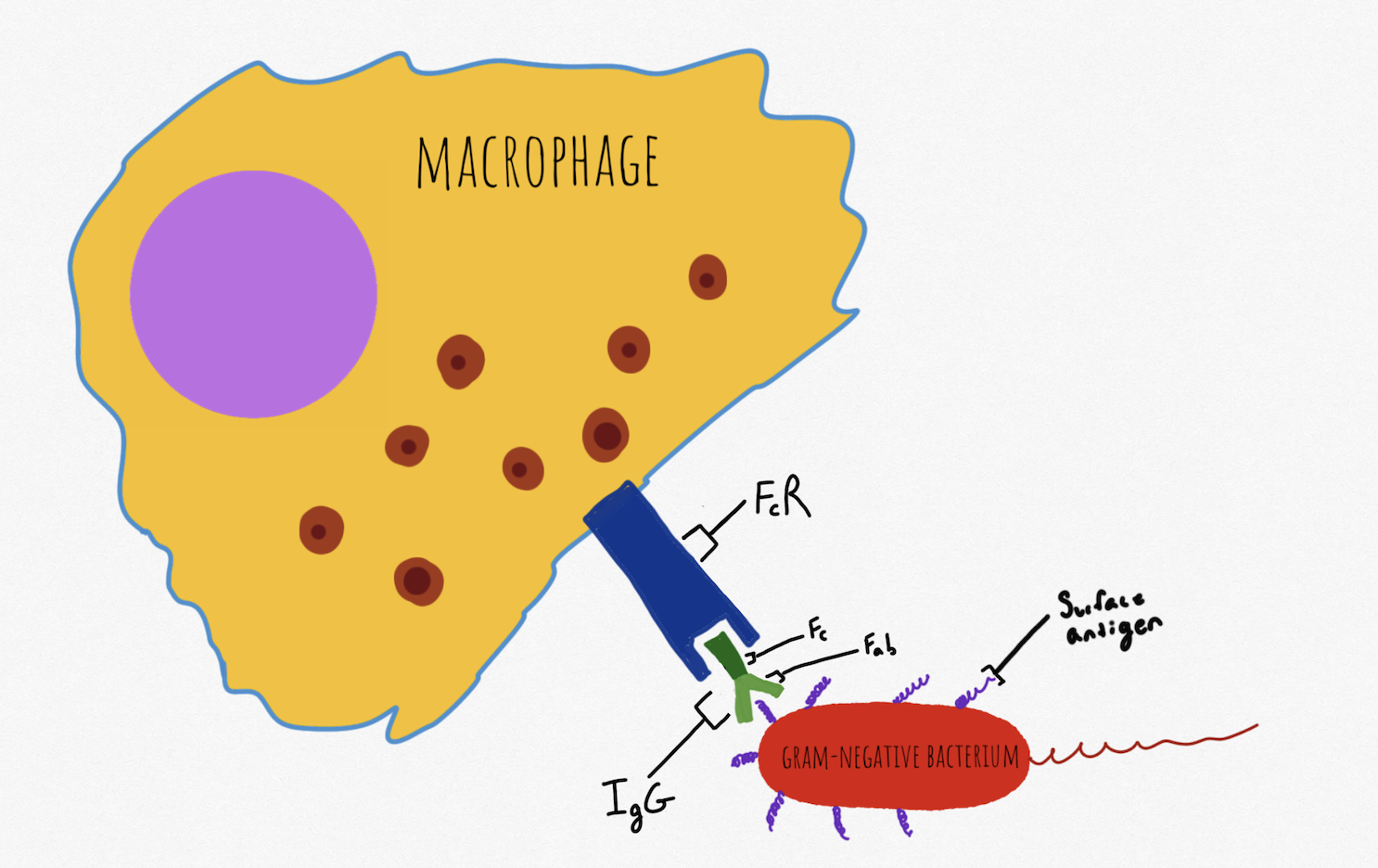
Antibody-mediated opsonization. FcR on phagocytic cells recognize the Fc region of the antibody.

Antibodies are synthesized by B cells and are secreted in response to recognition of specific antigenic epitopes, and bind only to specific epitopes (regions) on an antigen. They comprise the adaptive opsonization pathway, and are composed of two fragments: antigen binding region (Fab region) and the fragment crystallizable region (Fc region). The Fab region is able to bind to a specific epitope on an antigen, such as a specific region of a bacterial surface protein. The Fc region of IgG is recognized by the Fc receptor (FcR) on natural killer cells and other effector cells; the binding of IgG to antigen causes a conformational change that allows FcR to bind the Fc region and initiate attack on the pathogen through the release of lytic products. Antibodies may also tag tumor cells or virally infected cells, with NK cells responding via the FcR; this process is known as antibody-dependent cellular cytotoxicity (ADCC).

Both IgM and IgG undergo conformational change upon binding antigen that allows complement protein C1q to associate with the Fc region of the antibody. C1q association eventually leads to the recruitment of complement C4b and C3b, both of which are recognized by complement receptor 1, 3, and 4 (CR1, CR3, CR4), which are present on most phagocytes. In this way, the complement system participates in the adaptive immune response.

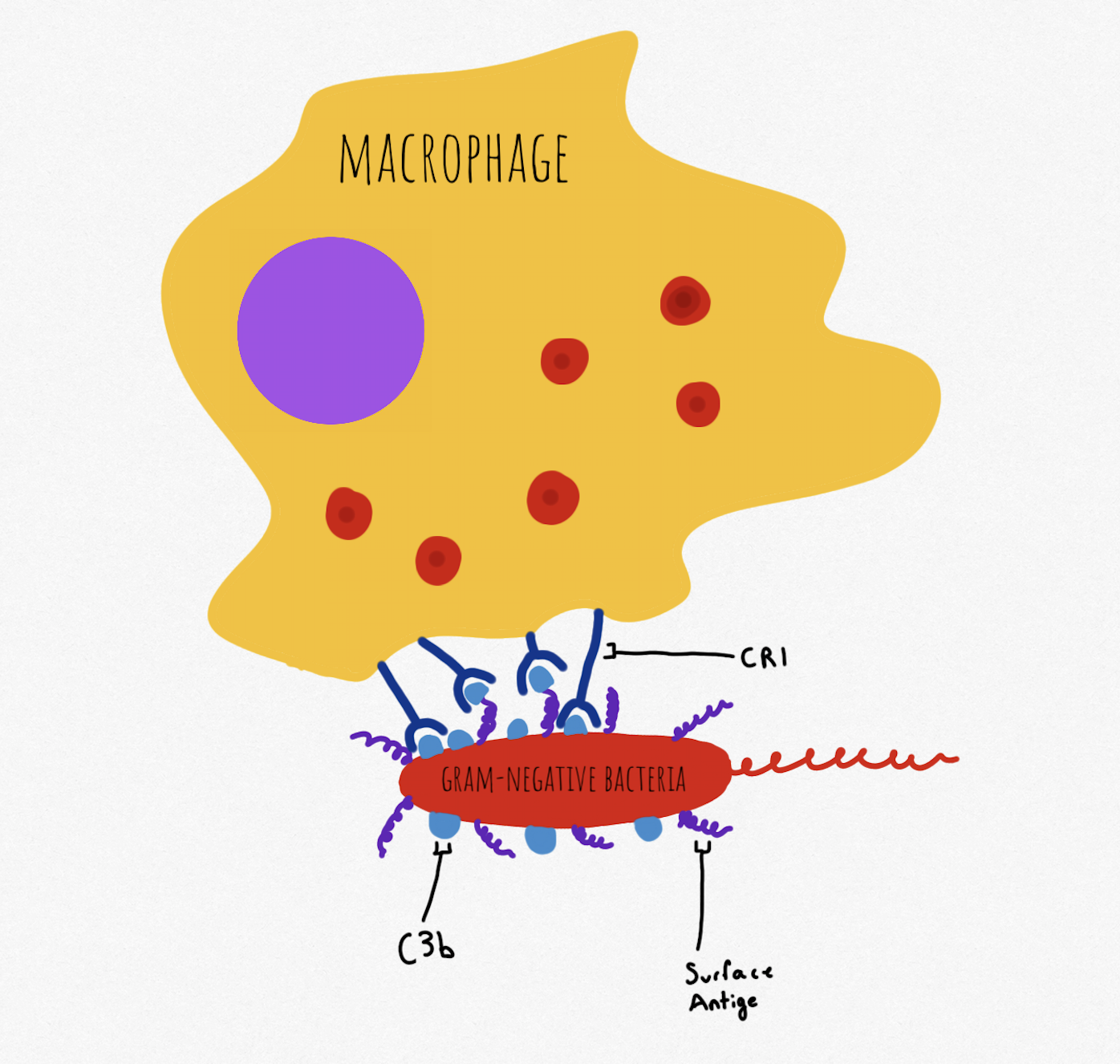
Opsonization by C3b. CR1 recognizes C3b deposited on antigen

C3d, a cleavage product of C3, recognizes pathogen-associated molecular patterns (PAMPs) and can opsonize molecules to the CR2 receptor on B cells. This lowers the threshold of interaction required for B cell activation via the B cell receptor, and aids in the activation of the adaptive response.

=== Innate ===
The complement system, independently of the adaptive immune response, is able to opsonize pathogens before adaptive immunity may even be required. Complement proteins involved in innate opsonization include C4b, C3b and iC3b. In the alternative pathway of complement activation, circulating C3b is deposited directly onto antigens with particular PAMPs, such as lipopolysaccharides on gram-negative bacteria. C3b is recognized by CR1 on phagocytes. iC3b attaches to apoptotic cells and bodies and facilitates clearance of dead cells and remnants without initiating inflammatory pathways, through interaction with CR3 and CR4 on phagocytes.

Mannose-binding lectins, or ficolins, along with pentraxins and collectins are able to recognize certain types of carbohydrates that are expressed on the cell membranes of bacteria, fungi, viruses, and parasites, and can act as opsonin by activating the complement system and phagocytic cells.

== Targets ==
=== Apoptotic cells ===
A number of opsonins play a role in marking apoptotic cells for phagocytosis without a pro-inflammatory response.

Members of the pentraxin family can bind to apoptotic cell membrane components like phosphatidylcholine (PC) and phosphatidylethanolamine (PE). IgM antibodies also bind to PC. Collectin molecules such as mannose-binding lectin (MBL), surfactant protein A (SP-A), and SP-D interact with unknown ligands on apoptotic cell membranes. When bound to the appropriate ligand these molecules interact with phagocyte receptors, enhancing phagocytosis of the marked cell.

C1q is capable of binding directly to apoptotic cells. It can also indirectly bind to apoptotic cells via intermediates like IgM autoantibodies, MBL, and pentraxins. In both cases C1q activates complement, resulting in the cells being marked for phagocytosis by C3b and C4b. C1q is an important contributor to the clearance of apoptotic cells and debris. This process usually occurs in late apoptotic cells.

Opsonization of apoptotic cells occurs by different mechanisms in a tissue-dependent pattern. For example, while C1q is necessary for proper apoptotic cell clearance in the peritoneal cavity, it is not important in the lungs where SP-D plays an important role.

=== Pathogens ===
As part of the late stage adaptive immune response, pathogens and other particles are marked by IgG antibodies. These antibodies interact with Fc receptors on macrophages and neutrophils resulting in phagocytosis. The C1 complement complex can also interact with the Fc region of IgG and IgM immune complexes activating the classical complement pathway and marking the antigen with C3b. C3b can spontaneously bind to pathogen surfaces through the alternative complement pathway. Furthermore, pentraxins can directly bind to C1q from the C1 complex.

SP-A opsonizes a number of bacterial and viral pathogens for clearance by lung alveolar macrophages.

== See also ==
- Antibody opsonization
