= Complement component 3 =

Protein found in humans

C3
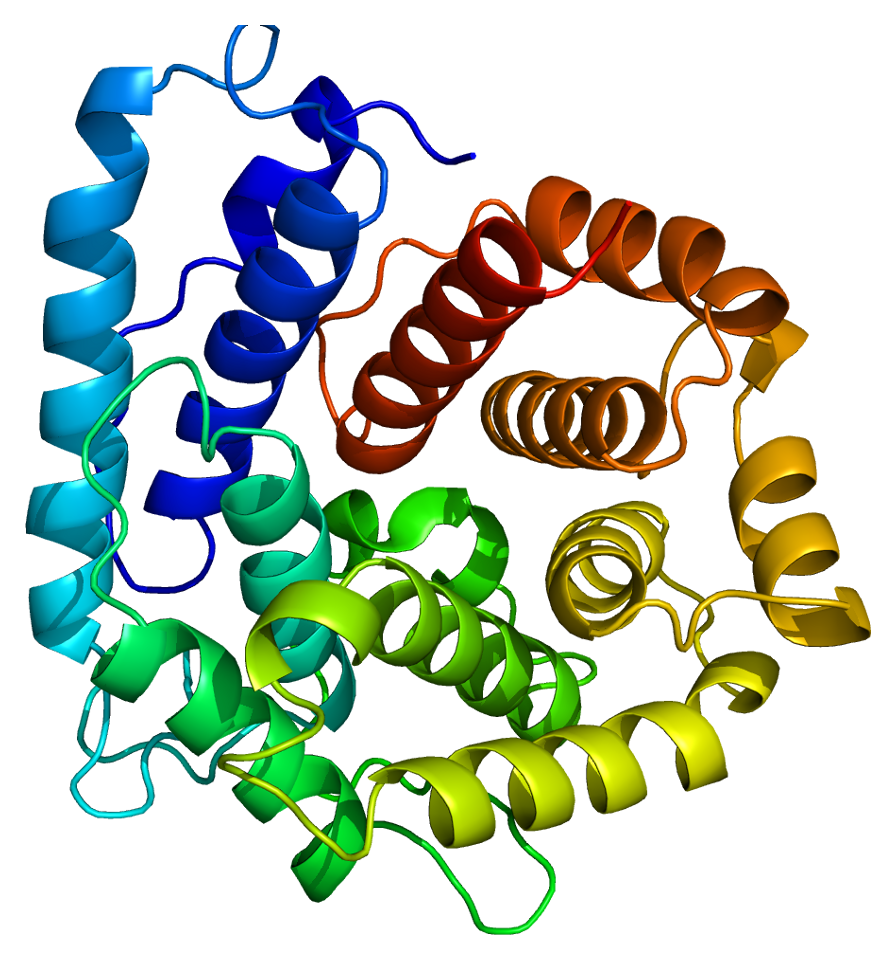

Identifiers
- Aliases: C3, AHUS5, ARMD9, ASP, C3a, C3b, CPAMD1, HEL-S-62p, complement component 3, complement C3
- External IDs: OMIM: 120700; MGI: 88227; GeneCards: C3
Available structures
PDB	Ortholog search: PDBe RCSB
PDB	List of PDB id codes 4ONT, 1C3D, 1GHQ, 1W2S, 2A73, 2A74, 2GOX, 2I07, 2ICE, 2ICF, 2NOJ, 2QKI, 2WII, 2WIN, 2WY7, 2WY8, 2XQW, 2XWB, 2XWJ, 3D5R, 3D5S, 3G6J, 3L3O, 3L5N, 3NMS, 3OED, 3OHX, 3OXU, 3RJ3, 3T4A, 4HW5, 4HWJ, 4I6O, 4M76, 4ZH1, 5FOB, 5FO9, 5FO7, 5FO8, 5FOA

Gene location (Human)
Chr.	Chromosome 19 (human)
Band	19p13.3	Start	6,677,704 bp
Band	19p13.3	End	6,730,562 bp

Gene location (Mouse)
Chr.	Chromosome 17 (mouse)
Band	17 D|17 29.72 cM	Start	57,510,970 bp
Band	17 D|17 29.72 cM	End	57,535,136 bp
RNA expression pattern
Bgee	Human / Mouse (ortholog); Top expressed in: parietal pleura; palpebral conjunctiva; right lobe of liver; germinal epithelium; pericardium; peritoneum; gastric mucosa; left uterine tube; right adrenal cortex; left adrenal cortex / Top expressed in: left lobe of liver; mesenteric lymph nodes; gallbladder; intercostal muscle; tunica adventitia of aorta; subcutaneous adipose tissue; superior surface of tongue; white adipose tissue; granulocyte; right lung; More reference expression data
BioGPS	n/a
Gene ontology
Molecular function	C5L2 anaphylatoxin chemotactic receptor binding; protein binding; endopeptidase inhibitor activity; signaling receptor binding; serine-type endopeptidase activity
Cellular component	blood microparticle; plasma membrane; extracellular fluid; extracellular region; extracellular exosome
Biological process	G protein-coupled receptor signaling pathway; positive regulation of phagocytosis; positive regulation of protein phosphorylation; complement activation, alternative pathway; lipid metabolism; immune system process; complement activation; positive regulation of lipid storage; positive regulation of type IIa hypersensitivity; fatty acid metabolic process; positive regulation of angiogenesis; positive regulation of G protein-coupled receptor signaling pathway; positive regulation of apoptotic cell clearance; immune response; complement activation, classical pathway; regulation of immune response; positive regulation of activation of membrane attack complex; positive regulation of vascular endothelial growth factor production; inflammatory response; positive regulation of glucose transmembrane transport; regulation of complement activation; signal transduction; negative regulation of endopeptidase activity; regulation of triglyceride biosynthetic process; proteolysis; innate immune response
Sources:Amigo / QuickGO
Orthologs
Databases	NCBI: entry; OMA: entry
Species	Human	Mouse
Entrez	718	12266
Ensembl	ENSG00000125730	ENSMUSG00000024164
UniProt	P01024	P01027
RefSeq (mRNA)	NM_000064	NM_009778
RefSeq (protein)	NP_000055	NP_033908
Location (UCSC)	Chr 19: 6.68 – 6.73 Mb	Chr 17: 57.51 – 57.54 Mb
PubMed search
- Wikidata
View/Edit Human	View/Edit Mouse

Complement component 3, often simply called C3, is a protein of the immune system that is found primarily in the blood. It plays a central role in the complement system of vertebrate animals and contributes to innate immunity. In humans, it is encoded on chromosome 19 by a gene called C3.

Deficiencies and defects of C3 result in the affected person being immunocompromised and particularly vulnerable to bacterial infections.

== Structure ==
Complement component 3 (C3) is a large, multidomain glycoprotein that is composed of two polypeptide chains-an α-chain (approximately 110 kDa) and a β-chain (approximately 75 kDa)-which are covalently linked by a single disulfide bond and further associated through non-covalent interactions. The mature human C3 protein contains 1,641 amino acids and is organized into thirteen distinct domains, nine of which were unpredicted prior to crystallographic studies. These domains fold into a highly asymmetrical shape, with six domains derived from the α and β chains. C3 contains two main N-linked glycosylation sites: Asn-917 on the α-chain and Asn-63 on the β-chain, which together account for about 1.5% of its molecular weight. A unique feature of C3 is its internal thioester bond, formed during post-translational modification, which is essential for covalent attachment of activated C3b to target surfaces. Upon activation by C3 convertase, the α-chain is cleaved, releasing the anaphylatoxin C3a and generating C3b, which exposes the reactive thioester group. The structure of C3 is highly flexible, particularly in the α-chain, allowing for marked conformational changes that are critical for its activation, regulation, and diverse biological functions.

Several crystallographic structures of C3 have been determined and reveal that this protein contains 13 domains.
The C3 precursor protein is first processed by the removal of 4 Arginine residues, forming two chains, beta and alpha, linked by a disulfide bond. The C3 convertase activates C3 by cleaving the alpha chain, releasing C3a anaphylatoxin and generating C3b (beta chain + alpha' (alpha prime) chain).

== Function ==
C3 plays a central role in the activation of the complement system. Its activation is required for both classical and alternative complement activation pathways. People with C3 deficiency are susceptible to bacterial infection.

One form of C3-convertase, also known as C4b2b (formally known as C4b2a), is formed by a heterodimer of activated forms of C4 and C2. It catalyzes the proteolytic cleavage of C3 into C3a and C3b, generated during activation through the classical pathway as well as the lectin pathway. C3a is an anaphylatoxin and the precursor of some cytokines such as ASP, and C3b serves as an opsonizing agent. Factor I can cleave C3b into C3c and C3d, the latter of which plays a role in enhancing B cell responses. In the alternative complement pathway, C3 is cleaved by C3bBb, another form of C3-convertase composed of activated forms of C3 (C3b) and factor B (Bb). Once C3 is activated to C3b, it exposes a reactive thioester that allows the peptide to covalently attach to any surface that can provide a nucleophile such as a primary amine or a hydroxyl group. Activated C3 can then interact with factor B. Factor B is then activated by factor D, to form Bb. The resultant complex, C3bBb, is called the alternative pathway (AP) C3 convertase.

C3bBb is deactivated in many steps. First, the proteolytic component of the convertase, Bb, is removed by complement regulatory proteins having decay-accelerating factor (DAF) activity. Next, C3b is broken down progressively to first iC3b, then C3c + C3dg, and then finally C3d. Factor I is the protease cleaves C3b but requires a cofactor (e.g. Factor H, CR1, MCP or C4BP) for activity.

== Biosynthesis ==
In humans, C3 is predominantly synthesised by liver hepatocytes and to some degree by epidermis keratinocytes.

== Regulation ==
Factor H is the primary regulator of C3. Deficiency of Factor H may lead to uncontrolled C3 activity through the alternative pathway of the complement system.

== Clinical significance ==
Complement tests
C4 (C)	FB (A)	C3	CH50	Conditions
·	↓	↓	↓	PSG, C3 NeF AA
↓	·	↓	·	HAE, C4D
·	·	·	↓	TCPD
↓	·/↓	↓	↓	SLE
↑	↑	↑	↑	inflammation

=== Monitoring ===
Levels of C3 in the blood may be measured to support or refute a particular medical diagnosis. For example, low C3 levels are associated with Systemic Lupus Erythematosus (SLE) and some types of kidney disease such as post-infectious glomerulonephritis, membranoproliferative glomerulonephritis, and shunt nephritis.

=== Pathology ===
Deficiency of C3 results in the affected person being immunocompromised. Specifically, they are vulnerable to bacterial pathogens, including repeat infections by the same organism, but are not susceptible to viruses. This vulnerability also occurs in an individual deficient in C1, C2, C4, or any of their required components or associated proteins, and the clinical effects are very similar regardless of the specific deficiency. This is because all of these must work with C3 for the complement system to function.

Affected people are particularly vulnerable to infections with Gram-negative organisms such as pathogenic E. coli or Salmonella enterica. Additionally, C3 and other complement deficiencies are associated with frequent and severe respiratory infections, as well as other infections that invade and penetrate tissue layers.

Some data shows that acquired C3 deficiency, including when this is intentionally done for medical immunosuppression purposes, may not significantly impact a person's immune function long-term. However, by contrast, congenital C3 deficiency is known to cause chronic illness.

Additionally, several forms of C3 deficiency contribute to the development of systemic lupus erythematosus and other autoimmune diseases.
