= Anaphylatoxin =

Anaphylotoxin-like domain
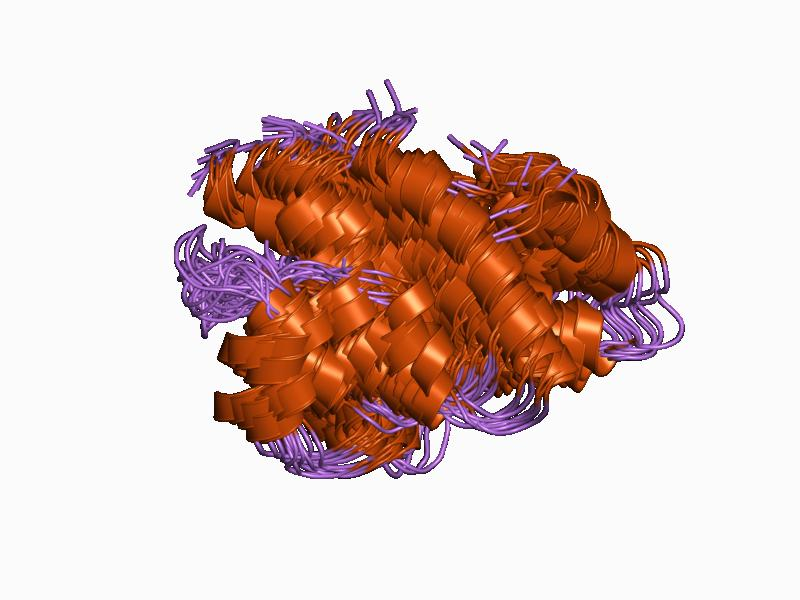
- Structure of porcine C5adesArg.

Identifiers
- Symbol: ANATO
- Pfam: PF01821
- InterPro: IPR000020
- SMART: ANATO
- PROSITE: PDOC00906
- SCOP2: 1c5a / SCOPe / SUPFAM
Available protein structures:
- PDB: 2a73B:693-728 1c5a :21-55 1cfaA:698-732 1kjs :698-732 IPR000020 PF01821 (ECOD; PDBsum)
- AlphaFold: IPR000020; PF01821

Anaphylatoxins, or complement peptides, are fragments (C3a, C4a and C5a) that are produced as part of the activation of the complement system. Complement components C3, C4 and C5 are large glycoproteins that have important functions in the immune response and host defense. They have a wide variety of biological activities and are proteolytically activated by cleavage at a specific site, forming a- and b-fragments. A-fragments form distinct structural domains of approximately 76 amino acids, coded for by a single exon within the complement protein gene. The C3a, C4a and C5a components are referred to as anaphylatoxins: they cause smooth muscle contraction, vasodilation, histamine release from mast cells, and enhanced vascular permeability. They also mediate chemotaxis, inflammation, and generation of cytotoxic oxygen radicals. The proteins are highly hydrophilic, with a mainly alpha-helical structure held together by 3 disulfide bridges.

== Function ==
Anaphylatoxins are able to trigger degranulation (release of substances) of endothelial cells, mast cells or phagocytes, which produce a local inflammatory response. If the degranulation is widespread, it can cause a shock-like syndrome similar to that of an allergic reaction.

Anaphylatoxins indirectly mediate:

- smooth muscle cells contraction, for example bronchospasms
- increase in the permeability of blood capillaries
- C5a indirectly mediates chemotaxis—receptor-mediated movement of leukocytes in the direction of the increasing concentration of anaphylatoxins

== Examples ==
Important anaphylatoxins:

- C5a has the highest specific biological activity and is able to act directly on neutrophils and monocytes to speed up the phagocytosis of pathogens.
- C3a works with C5a to activate mast cells, recruit antibody, complement and phagocytic cells and increase fluid in the tissue, all of which contribute to the initiation of the adaptive immune response.
- C4a is the least active anaphylatoxin.

== Terminology ==
Although some drugs (morphine, codeine, synthetic ACTH) and some neurotransmitters (norepinephrine, substance P) are important mediators of degranulation of mast cells or basophils, they are generally not called anaphylatoxins. This term is reserved only for fragments of the complement system.

== Human proteins containing this domain ==
C3, C4A, C4B, C4B-1, C5, FBLN1, FBLN2

== See also ==
- Allergy
- Anaphylatoxin receptors
- Anaphylaxis
- Complement system
- Inflammation
- Immune system
- Nervous system
