= Complement system =

Part of the immune system that enhances the ability of antibodies and phagocytic cells

Scheme of the complement system

The complement system, also known as complement cascade, is a part of the humoral, innate immune system and enhances (complements) the ability of antibodies and phagocytic cells to clear microbes and damaged cells from an organism, promote inflammation, and attack the pathogen's cell membrane. Despite being part of the innate immune system, the complement system can be recruited and brought into action by antibodies generated by the adaptive immune system.

The complement system consists of a number of small, inactive, liver synthesized protein precursors circulating in the blood. When stimulated by one of several triggers, proteases in the system cleave specific proteins to release cytokines and initiate an amplifying cascade of further cleavages. The result of this complement activation or complement fixation cascade is stimulation of phagocytes to clear foreign and damaged material, inflammation to attract additional phagocytes, and activation of the cell-killing membrane attack complex. About 50 proteins and protein fragments make up the complement system, including plasma proteins, and cell membrane receptors. They account for about 10% of the globulin fraction of blood serum.

Three biochemical pathways activate the complement system: the classical complement pathway, the alternative complement pathway, and the lectin pathway. The alternative pathway accounts for the majority of terminal pathway activation and so therapeutic efforts in disease have revolved around its inhibition.

== History ==
In 1888, George Nuttall found that sheep blood serum had mild killing activity against the bacterium that causes anthrax. The killing activity disappeared when he heated the blood. In 1891, Hans Ernst August Buchner, noting the same property of blood in his experiments, named the killing property "alexin", which means "to ward off" in Greek. By 1894, several laboratories had demonstrated that serum from guinea pigs that had recovered from cholera killed the cholera bacterium in vitro. Heating the serum destroyed its killing activity. Nevertheless, the heat-inactivated serum, when injected into guinea pigs exposed to the cholera bacteria, maintained its ability to protect the animals from illness. Jules Bordet, a young Belgian scientist in Paris at the Pasteur Institute, concluded that this principle has two components, one that maintained a "sensitizing" effect after being heated and one (alexin) whose toxic effect was lost after being heated. The heat-stable component was responsible for immunity against specific microorganisms, whereas the heat-sensitive component was responsible for the non-specific antimicrobial activity conferred by all normal sera. In 1899, Paul Ehrlich renamed the heat-sensitive component "complement."

Ehrlich introduced the term "complement" as part of his larger theory of the immune system. According to this theory, the immune system consists of cells that have specific receptors on their surfaces to recognize antigens. Upon immunization with an antigen, more of these receptors are formed, and they are then shed from the cells to circulate in the blood. Those receptors, which we now call "antibodies", were called by Ehrlich "amboceptors" to emphasise their bifunctional binding capacity: They recognise and bind to a specific antigen, but they also recognise and bind to the heat-labile antimicrobial component of fresh serum. Ehrlich, therefore, named this heat-labile component "complement", because it is something in the blood that "complements" the cells of the immune system. Ehrlich believed that each antigen-specific amboceptor has its own specific complement, whereas Bordet believed that there is only one type of complement. In the early 20th century, this controversy was resolved when it became understood that complement can act in combination with specific antibodies, or on its own in a non-specific way.

== Functions ==
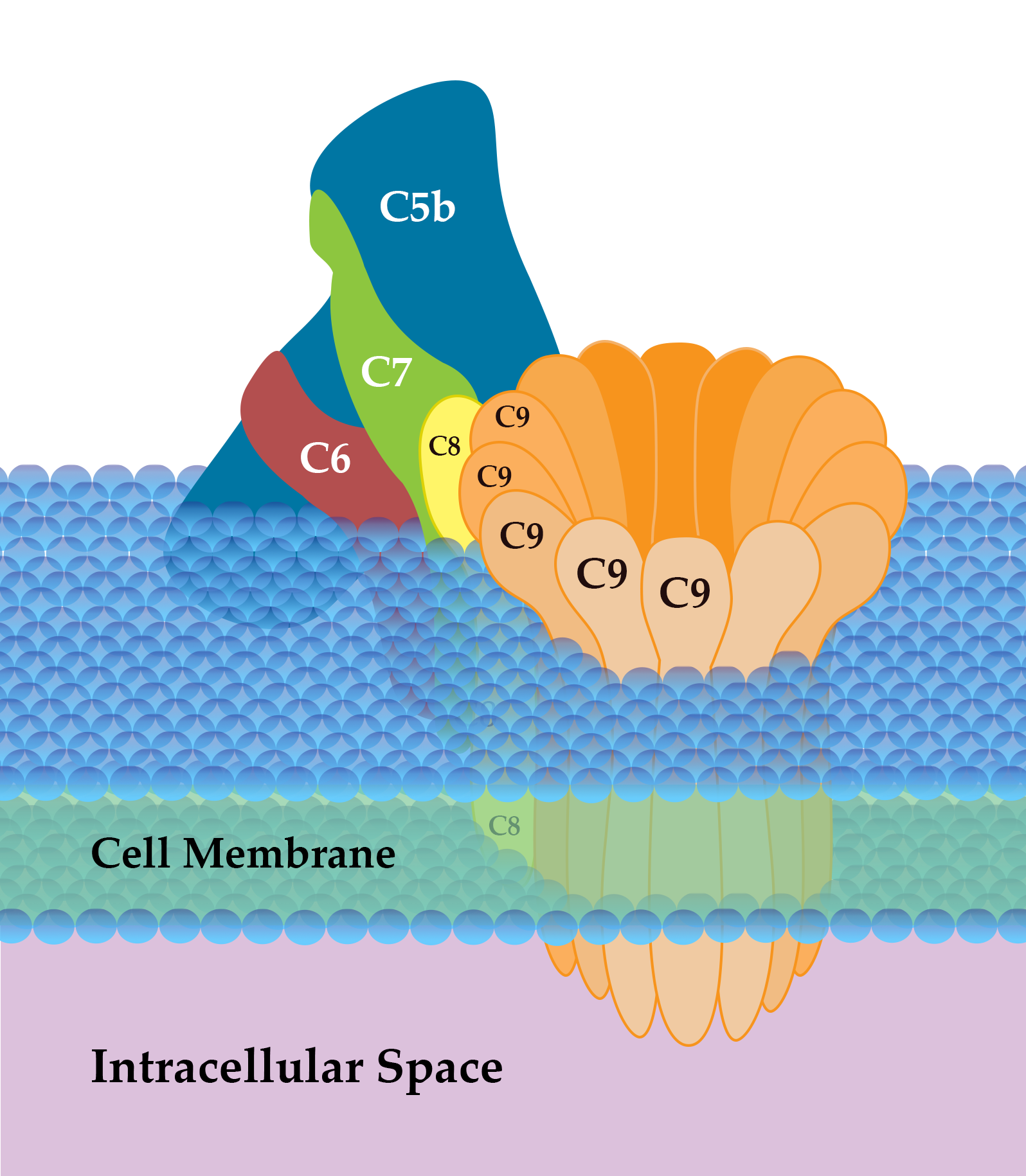
Membrane attack complex (Terminal Complement Complex C5b-9)

Complement triggers the following immune functions:

1. Membrane attack – by rupturing the cell wall of bacteria. (classical complement pathway)
2. Phagocytosis – by opsonizing antigens. C3b has most important opsonizing activity. (alternative complement pathway)
3. Inflammation – by attracting macrophages and neutrophils. (lectin pathway)

== Overview ==
Most of the proteins and glycoproteins that constitute the complement system are synthesized by hepatocytes. But significant amounts are also produced by tissue macrophages, blood monocytes, and epithelial cells of the genitourinary system and gastrointestinal tract. The three pathways of activation all generate homologous variants of the protease C3-convertase. The classical complement pathway typically requires antigen-antibody complexes for activation (specific immune response), whereas the alternative pathway can be activated by spontaneous complement component 3 (C3) hydrolysis, foreign material, pathogens, or damaged cells. The mannose-binding lectin pathway can be activated by C3 hydrolysis or antigens without the presence of antibodies (non-specific immune response). In all three pathways, C3-convertase cleaves and activates component C3, creating C3a and C3b, and causes a cascade of further cleavage and activation events. C3b binds to the surface of pathogens, leading to greater internalization by phagocytic cells by opsonization.

In the alternative pathway, C3b binds to Factor B. Factor D releases Factor Ba from Factor B bound to C3b. The complex of C3b(2)Bb is a protease which cleaves C5 into C5b and C5a. C5 convertase is also formed by the classical pathway when C3b binds C4b and C2b. C5a is an important chemotactic protein, helping recruit inflammatory cells. C3a is the precursor of an important cytokine (adipokine) named ASP (although this is not universally accepted) and is usually rapidly cleaved by carboxypeptidase B. Both C3a and C5a have anaphylatoxin activity, directly triggering degranulation of mast cells as well as increasing vascular permeability and smooth muscle contraction. C5b initiates the membrane attack pathway, which results in the membrane attack complex (MAC), consisting of C5b, C6, C7, C8, and polymeric C9. MAC is the cytolytic endproduct of the complement cascade; it forms a transmembrane channel, which causes osmotic lysis of the target cell. Kupffer cells and other macrophage cell types help clear complement-coated pathogens. As part of the innate immune system, elements of the complement cascade can be found in species earlier than vertebrates; most recently in the protostome horseshoe crab species, putting the origins of the system back further than was previously thought.

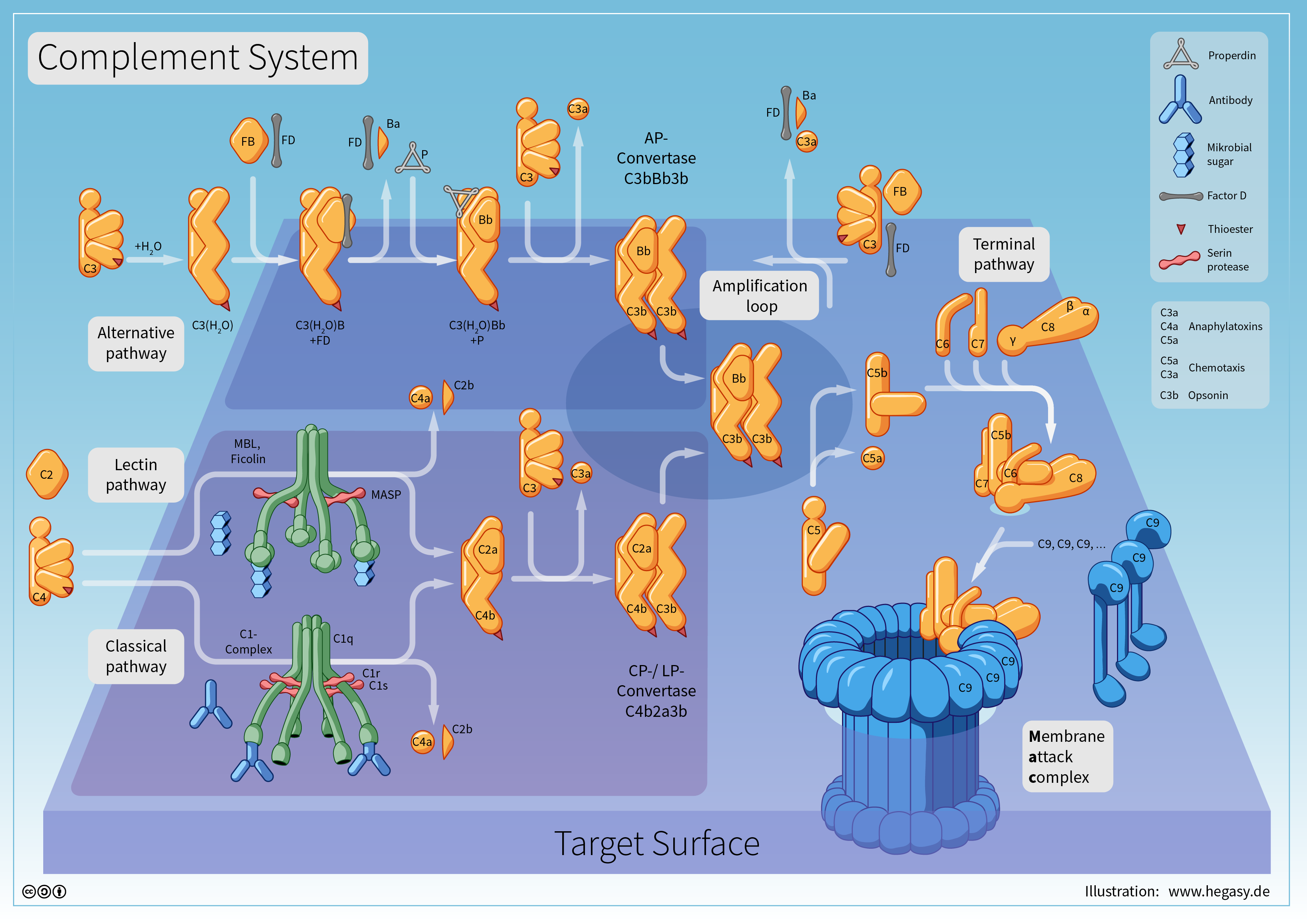
Reaction cascade of the complement system: classical, alternative, and lectin pathways, amplification loop, terminal pathway, and membrane attack complex.

=== Classical pathway ===
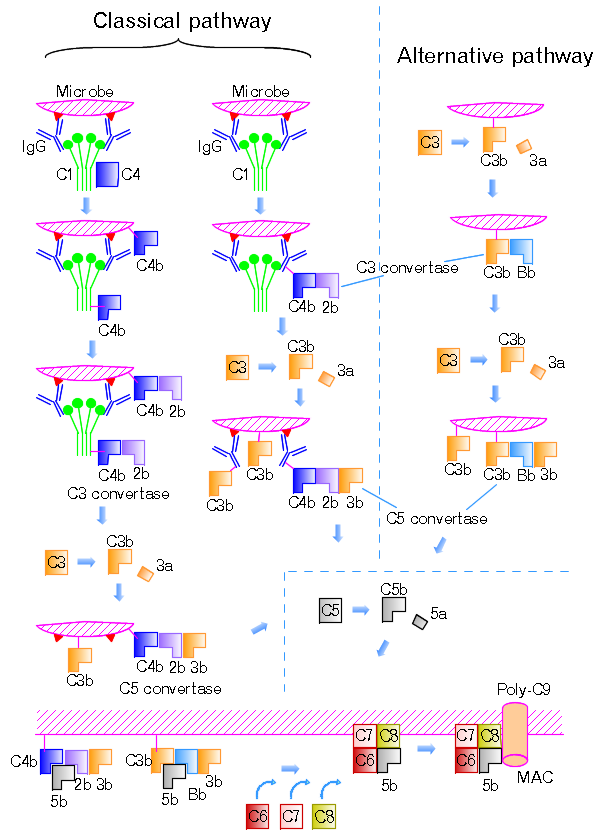
The classical and alternative complement pathways

The classical pathway is triggered by activation of the C1-complex. The C1-complex is composed of 1 molecule of C1q, 2 molecules of C1r and 2 molecules of C1s, or C1qr^{2}s^{2}. This occurs when C1q binds to IgM or IgG complexed with antigens. A single pentameric IgM can initiate the pathway, while several, ideally six, IgGs are needed. This also occurs when C1q binds directly to the surface of the pathogen. Such binding leads to conformational changes in the C1q molecule, which leads to the activation of two C1r molecules. C1r is a serine protease. They then cleave C1s (another serine protease). The C1r^{2}s^{2} component now splits C4 and then C2, producing C4a, C4b, C2a, and C2b (historically, the larger fragment of C2 was called C2a but is now referred to as C2b). C4b and C2b bind to form the classical pathway C3-convertase (C4b2b complex), which promotes cleavage of C3 into C3a and C3b. C3b later joins with C4b2b to make C5 convertase (C4b2b3b complex).

=== Alternative pathway ===
The alternative pathway is continuously activated at a low level, analogous to a car engine at idle, as a result of spontaneous C3 hydrolysis due to the breakdown of the internal thioester bond (C3 is mildly unstable in aqueous environment). The alternative pathway does not rely on pathogen-binding antibodies like the other pathways. C3b that is generated from C3 by a C3 convertase enzyme complex in the fluid phase is rapidly inactivated by factor H and factor I, as is the C3b-like C3 that is the product of spontaneous cleavage of the internal thioester. In contrast, when the internal thioester of C3 reacts with a hydroxyl or amino group of a molecule on the surface of a cell or pathogen, the C3b that is now covalently bound to the surface is protected from factor H-mediated inactivation. The surface-bound C3b may now bind factor B to form C3bB. This complex in the presence of factor D will be cleaved into Ba and Bb. Bb will remain associated with C3b to form C3bBb, which is the alternative pathway C3 convertase.

The C3bBb complex is stabilized by binding oligomers of factor P (properdin). The stabilized C3 convertase, C3bBbP, then acts enzymatically to cleave much more C3, some of which becomes covalently attached to the same surface as C3b. This newly bound C3b recruits more B, D and P activity and greatly amplifies the complement activation. When complement is activated on a cell surface, the activation is limited by endogenous complement regulatory proteins, which include CD35, CD46, CD55 and CD59, depending on the cell. Pathogens, in general, don't have complement regulatory proteins (there are many exceptions, which reflect adaptation of microbial pathogens to vertebrate immune defenses). Thus, the alternative complement pathway is able to distinguish self from non-self on the basis of the surface expression of complement regulatory proteins. Host cells don't accumulate cell surface C3b (and the proteolytic fragment of C3b called iC3b) because this is prevented by the complement regulatory proteins, while foreign cells, pathogens and abnormal surfaces may be heavily decorated with C3b and iC3b. Accordingly, the alternative complement pathway is one element of innate immunity.

Once the alternative C3 convertase enzyme is formed on a pathogen or cell surface, it may bind covalently another C3b, to form C3bBbC3bP, the C5 convertase. This enzyme then cleaves C5 to C5a, a potent anaphylatoxin, and C5b. The C5b then recruits and assembles C6, C7, C8 and multiple C9 molecules to assemble the membrane attack complex. This creates a hole or pore in the membrane that can kill or damage the pathogen or cell.

=== Lectin pathway ===
The lectin pathway is homologous to the classical pathway, but with the opsonin, mannose-binding lectin (MBL), and ficolins, instead of C1q. This pathway is activated by binding of MBL to mannose residues on the pathogen surface, which activates the MBL-associated serine proteases, MASP-1, and MASP-2 (very similar to C1r and C1s, respectively), which can then split C4 into C4a and C4b and C2 into C2a and C2b. C4b and C2b then bind together to form the classical C3-convertase, as in the classical pathway. Ficolins are homologous to MBL and function via MASP in a similar way. Several single-nucleotide polymorphisms have been described in M-ficolin in humans, with effect on ligand-binding ability and serum levels. Historically, the larger fragment of C2 was named C2a, but it is now referred to as C2b. In invertebrates without an adaptive immune system, ficolins are expanded and their binding specificities diversified to compensate for the lack of pathogen-specific recognition molecules.

=== Complement protein fragment nomenclature ===
Immunology textbooks have used different naming assignments for the smaller and larger fragments of C2 as C2a and C2b. The preferred assignment appears to be that the smaller fragment be designated as C2a: as early as 1994, a well known textbook recommended that the larger fragment of C2 should be designated C2b. However, this was amplified in their 1999 4th edition, to say that: "It is also useful to be aware that the larger active fragment of C2 was originally designated C2a, and is still called that in some texts and research papers. Here, for consistency, we shall call all large fragments of complement b, so the larger fragment of C2 will be designated C2b. In the classical and lectin pathways the C3 convertase enzyme is formed from membrane-bound C4b with C2b."

This nomenclature is used in another literature: The assignment is mixed in the latter literature, though. Some sources designate the larger and smaller fragments as C2a and C2b respectively while other sources apply the converse. However, due to the widely established convention, C2b here is the larger fragment, which, in the classical pathway, forms C4b2b (classically C4b2a). It may be noteworthy that, in a series of editions of Janeway's book, 1st to 7th, in the latest edition they withdraw the stance to indicate the larger fragment of C2 as C2b.

=== Viral inhibition ===
Fixation of the MBL protein on viral surfaces has also been shown to enhance neutralization of viral pathogens.

=== Review ===
Activation pathway	Classic	Alternative	Lectin
Activator	Ag–Ab Complex	spontaneous hydrolysis of C3	MBL-Mannose Complex
C3-convertase	C4b2b	C3bBb	C4b2b
C5-convertase	C4b2b3b	C3bBbC3b	C4b2b3b
MAC development	C5b+C6+C7+C8+C9		

== Activation of complements by antigen-associated antibody ==
In the classical pathway, C1 binds with its C1q subunits to Fc fragments (made of CH2 region) of IgG or IgM, which has formed a complex with antigens. C4b and C3b are also able to bind to antigen-associated IgG or IgM, to its Fc portion.

Such immunoglobulin-mediated binding of the complement may be interpreted as that the complement uses the ability of the immunoglobulin to detect and bind to non-self antigens as its guiding stick. The complement itself can bind non-self pathogens after detecting their pathogen-associated molecular patterns (PAMPs), however, utilizing specificity of the antibody, complements can detect non-self targets much more specifically.

Some components have a variety of binding sites. In the classical pathway, C4 binds to Ig-associated C1q and C1r^{2}s^{2} enzyme cleaves C4 to C4b and 4a. C4b binds to C1q, antigen-associated Ig (specifically to its Fc portion), and even to the microbe surface. C3b binds to antigen-associated Ig and to the microbe surface. Ability of C3b to bind to antigen-associated Ig would work effectively against antigen-antibody complexes to make them soluble.

== Regulation ==
The complement system has the potential to be extremely damaging to host tissues, meaning its activation must be tightly regulated. The complement system is regulated by complement control proteins, which are present at blood plasma and host cell membrane. Some complement control proteins are present on the membranes of self-cells preventing them from being targeted by complement. One example is CD59, also known as protectin, which inhibits C9 polymerization during the formation of the membrane attack complex. The classical pathway is inhibited by C1-inhibitor, which binds to C1 to prevent its activation. Another example is a plasma protein called Factor H (FH), which has a key role in down-regulating the alternative pathway. Factor H, along with another protein called Factor I, inactivates C3b, the active form of C3. This process prevents the formation of C3 convertase and halts the progression of the complement cascade. C3-convertase also can be inhibited by decay accelerating factor (DAF), which is bound to erythrocyte plasma membranes via a GPI anchor.

== Role in disease ==
=== Complement deficiency ===
It is thought that the complement system might play a role in many diseases with an immune component, such as Barraquer–Simons syndrome, asthma, lupus erythematosus, glomerulonephritis, various forms of arthritis, autoimmune heart disease, multiple sclerosis, inflammatory bowel disease, paroxysmal nocturnal hemoglobinuria, atypical hemolytic uremic syndrome and ischemia-reperfusion injuries, and rejection of transplanted organs.

Complement regulation is suggested to play a role in pregnancy. Improper alternative complement pathway activation may mediate recurrent immune-mediated fetal loss.

The complement system is also becoming increasingly implicated in diseases of the central nervous system such as Alzheimer's disease and other neurodegenerative conditions such as spinal cord injuries.

Deficiencies of the terminal pathway predispose to both autoimmune disease and infections (particularly Neisseria meningitidis, due to the role that the membrane attack complex ("MAC") plays in attacking Gram-negative bacteria).

Infections with N. meningitidis and N. gonorrhoeae are the only conditions known to be associated with deficiencies in the MAC components of complement. 40–50% of those with MAC deficiencies experience recurrent infections with N. meningitidis.

=== Deficiencies in complement regulators ===
Mutations in the genes of complement regulators, especially factor H, have been associated with atypical hemolytic uremic syndrome, and C3 glomerulopathy. Both of these disorders are currently thought to be due to complement overactivation either on the surface of host cells or in plasma, with the molecular location of genetic variation in complement proteins providing clues into the underlying disease processes. Moreover, several single nucleotide polymorphisms and mutations in the complement factor H gene (the most common of which results in the protein change p.Y402H) have been associated with the common eye disease age-related macular degeneration. Polymorphisms of complement component 3, complement factor B, and complement factor I, as well as deletion of complement factor H-related 3 and complement factor H-related 1, also affect a person's risk of developing age-related macular degeneration.

Mutations in the C1 inhibitor gene can cause hereditary angioedema, a genetic condition resulting from reduced regulation of bradykinin by C1-INH.

Paroxysmal nocturnal hemoglobinuria is caused by complement breakdown of RBCs due to an inability to make GPI. Thus the RBCs are not protected by GPI anchored proteins such as DAF.

=== Diagnostic tools ===
Diagnostic tools to measure complement activity include the total complement activity test.

The presence or absence of complement fixation upon a challenge can indicate whether particular antigens or antibodies are present in the blood. This is the principle of the complement fixation test.

== Modulation of the body by complement with infection ==
Excessive complement activity contributes to severe COVID-19 symptoms and disease. Although complement is intended to protect the body systems, under stress there can be more damage than protection. Research has suggested that the complement system is manipulated during HIV/AIDS, in a way that further damages the body.

== Role in the brain ==
Research from over the last decade has shown that complement proteins of the classical complement pathway have an important role in synaptic pruning in the brain during early development.
