= Complement component 9 =

Protein found in humans

C9

Identifiers
- Aliases: C9, ARMD15, C9D, complement component 9, complement C9
- External IDs: OMIM: 120940; MGI: 1098282; GeneCards: C9
Available structures
PDB	Ortholog search: PDBe RCSB
PDB	List of PDB id codes 5FMW

Gene location (Human)
Chr.	Chromosome 5 (human)
Band	5p13.1	Start	39,284,140 bp
Band	5p13.1	End	39,371,324 bp

Gene location (Mouse)
Chr.	Chromosome 15 (mouse)
Band	15|15 A1	Start	6,474,808 bp
Band	15|15 A1	End	6,528,232 bp
RNA expression pattern
Bgee	Human / Mouse (ortholog); Top expressed in: right lobe of liver; testicle; gonad; buccal mucosa cell; human kidney; corpus epididymis; stromal cell of endometrium; right adrenal gland; right adrenal cortex; right coronary artery / Top expressed in: left lobe of liver; gallbladder; olfactory epithelium; embryo; blastocyst; embryo; yolk sac; precursor cell; migratory enteric neural crest cell; thoracic diaphragm; More reference expression data
BioGPS	n/a
Gene ontology
Molecular function	growth factor activity
Cellular component	integral component of membrane; extracellular region; integral component of plasma membrane; extracellular exosome; blood microparticle; membrane; membrane attack complex; extracellular space; cytosol; plasma membrane; other organism cell membrane
Biological process	cytolysis; regulation of complement activation; hemolysis by symbiont of host erythrocytes; complement activation, alternative pathway; immune response; complement activation, classical pathway; immune system process; innate immune response; cell killing; protein homooligomerization
Sources:Amigo / QuickGO
Orthologs
Databases	NCBI: entry; OMA: entry
Species	Human	Mouse
Entrez	735	12279
Ensembl	ENSG00000113600	ENSMUSG00000022149
UniProt	P02748	P06683
RefSeq (mRNA)	NM_001737	NM_013485; NM_001368420; NM_001368421
RefSeq (protein)	NP_001728	NP_038513; NP_001355349; NP_001355350
Location (UCSC)	Chr 5: 39.28 – 39.37 Mb	Chr 15: 6.47 – 6.53 Mb
PubMed search
- Wikidata
View/Edit Human	View/Edit Mouse

Complement component 9 (C9) is a MACPF protein involved in the complement system, which is part of the innate immune system. Once activated, about 12-18 molecules of C9 polymerize to form pores in target cell membranes, causing lysis and cell death. C9 is one member of the complement membrane attack complex (MAC), which also includes complement components C5b, C6, C7 and C8. The formation of the MAC occurs through three distinct pathways: the classical, alternative, and lectin pathways. Pore formation by C9 is an important way that bacterial cells are killed during an infection, and the target cell is often covered in multiple MACs. The clinical impact of a deficiency in C9 is an infection with the gram-negative bacterium Neisseria meningitidis.

== Structure ==
C9 genes include 11 exons and 10 introns when found in fish. In fish, the liver is the site where the majority of complement components are produced and expressed, but C9 can also be found in other tissues. It is a single-chain glycoprotein with a four domain structure arranged in a globular bundle.

== Pore formation ==
MAC formation starts with the assembly of a tetrameric complex with the complement components C6, C7, C8, and C5b. The final step of MAC on target cell surfaces involves the polymerization of C9 molecules bound to C5b8 forming C5b-9. C9 molecules allow cylindrical, asymmetrical transmembrane pores to form. The overall complex belongs to MAC/perforin-like (MACPF)/CDC superfamily. Pore formation involves binding the C9 molecules to the target membrane, membrane molecules forming a pre-pore shape, and conformational change in the TMH1, the first transmembrane region, and TMH2, the second transmembrane region. The formations of pores leads to the killing of foreign pathogens and infected host cells.

== Relation to aging process ==
C9 was found to be the most strongly underexpressed serum protein in men who achieved longevity, compared to men who did not.
