= MACPF =

Large group of transport proteins

MAC/Perforin domain

Identifiers
- Symbol: MACPF
- Pfam: PF01823
- Pfam clan: CDC
- InterPro: IPR001862
- SMART: MACPF
- PROSITE: PDOC00251
- TCDB: 1.C.39
- OPM superfamily: 168
- OPM protein: 6h04
- Membranome: 233
Available protein structures:
- PDB: IPR001862 PF01823 (ECOD; PDBsum)
- AlphaFold: IPR001862; PF01823

The Membrane Attack Complex/Perforin (MACPF) superfamily, sometimes referred to as the MACPF/CDC superfamily, is named after a domain that is common to the membrane attack complex (MAC) proteins of the complement system (C6, C7, C8α, C8β and C9) and perforin (PF). Members of this protein family are pore-forming toxins (PFTs). In eukaryotes, MACPF proteins play a role in immunity and development.

Archetypal members of the family are complement C9 and perforin, both of which function in human immunity. C9 functions by punching holes in the membranes of Gram-negative bacteria. Perforin is released by cytotoxic T cells and lyses virally infected and transformed cells. In addition, perforin permits delivery of cytotoxic proteases called granzymes that cause cell death. Deficiency of either protein can result in human disease. Structural studies reveal that MACPF domains are related to cholesterol-dependent cytolysins (CDCs), a family of pore forming toxins previously thought to only exist in bacteria.

== Families ==
As of early 2016, there are three families belonging to the MACPF superfamily:

- 1.C.12 - The Thiol-activated Cholesterol-dependent Cytolysin (CDC) Family
- 1.C.39 - The Membrane Attack Complex/Perforin (MACPF) Family
- 1.C.97 - The Pleurotolysin Pore-forming (Pleurotolysin) Family

=== Membrane Attack Complex/Perforin (MACPF) Family ===
Proteins containing MACPF domains play key roles in vertebrate immunity, embryonic development, and neural-cell migration. The ninth component of complement and perforin form oligomeric pores that lyse bacteria and kill virus-infected cells, respectively. The crystal structure of a bacterial MACPF protein, Plu-MACPF from Photorhabdus luminescens was determined (PDB: 2QP2). The MACPF domain is structurally similar to pore-forming cholesterol-dependent cytolysins from gram-positive bacteria, suggesting that MACPF proteins create pores and disrupt cell membranes similar to cytolysin. A representative list of proteins belonging to the MACPF family can be found in the Transporter Classification Database.

== Biological roles of MACPF domain containing proteins ==
Many proteins belonging to the MACPF superfamily play key roles in plant and animal immunity.

Complement proteins C6-C9 all contain a MACPF domain and assemble into the membrane attack complex. C6, C7 and C8β appear to be non-lytic and function as scaffold proteins within the MAC. In contrast both C8α and C9 are capable of lysing cells. The final stage of MAC formation involves polymerisation of C9 into a large pore that punches a hole in the outer membrane of gram-negative bacteria.

Perforin is stored in granules within cytotoxic T-cells and is responsible for killing virally infected and transformed cells. Perforin functions via two distinct mechanisms. Firstly, like C9, high concentrations of perforin can form pores that lyse cells. Secondly, perforin permits delivery of the cytotoxic granzymes A and B into target cells. Once delivered, granzymes are able to induce apoptosis and cause target cell death.

The plant protein CAD1 (TC# 1.C.39.11.3) functions in the plant immune response to bacterial infection.

The sea anemone Actineria villosa uses a MACPF (AvTX-60A; TC# 1.C.39.10.1)protein as a lethal toxin.

MACPF proteins are also important for the invasion of the Malarial parasite into the mosquito host and the liver.

Not all MACPF proteins function in defence or attack. For example, astrotactin-1 (TC# 9.B.87.3.1) is involved in neural cell migration in mammals and apextrin (TC# 1.C.39.7.4) is involved in sea urchin (Heliocidaris erythrogramma) development. Drosophila Torso-like protein (TC# 1.C.39.15.1), which controls embryonic patterning, also contains a MACPF domain. Its function is implicated in a receptor tyrosine kinase signaling pathway that specifies differentiation and terminal cell fate.

Functionally uncharacterised MACPF proteins are sporadically distributed in bacteria. Several species of Chlamydia contain MACPF proteins. The insect pathogenic bacteria Photorhabdus luminescens also contains a MACPF protein, however, this molecule appears non-lytic.

== Structure and mechanism ==
The X-ray crystal structure of Plu-MACPF, a protein from the insect pathogenic enterobacteria Photorhabdus luminescens has been determined (figure 1). These data reveal that the MACPF domain is homologous to pore forming cholesterol dependent cytolysins (CDC's) from gram-positive pathogenic bacteria such as Clostridium perfringens (which causes gas gangrene). The amino acid sequence identity between the two families is extremely low, and the relationship is not detectable using conventional sequence based data mining techniques.

It is suggested that MACPF proteins and CDCs form pores in the same way (figure 1). Specifically it is hypothesised that MACPF proteins oligomerise to form a large circular pore (figure 2). A concerted conformational change within each monomer then results in two α-helical regions unwinding to form four amphipathic β-strands that span the membrane of the target cell. Like CDC's MACPF proteins are thus β-pore forming toxins that act like a molecular hole punch.

Other crystal structures for members of the MACPF superfamily can be found in RCSB: i.e., 3KK7, 3QOS, 3QQH, 3RD7, 3OJY

Mechanism of membrane attack by MACPF proteins

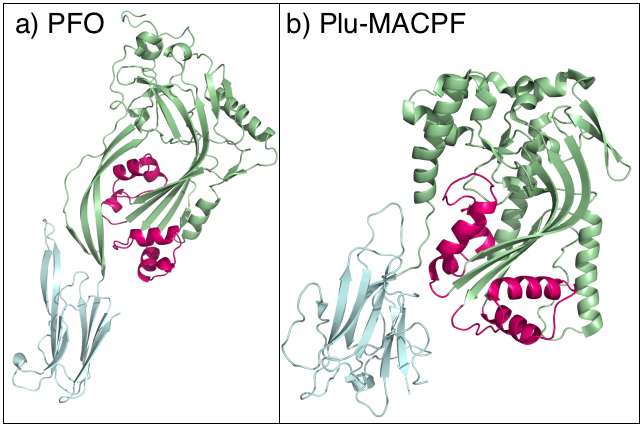
Figure 1: a) The structure of the CDC perfringolysin O and b) the structure of Plu-MACPF . In both proteins the two small clusters of α-helicesl that are proposed to unwind and pierce the membrane are in pink.

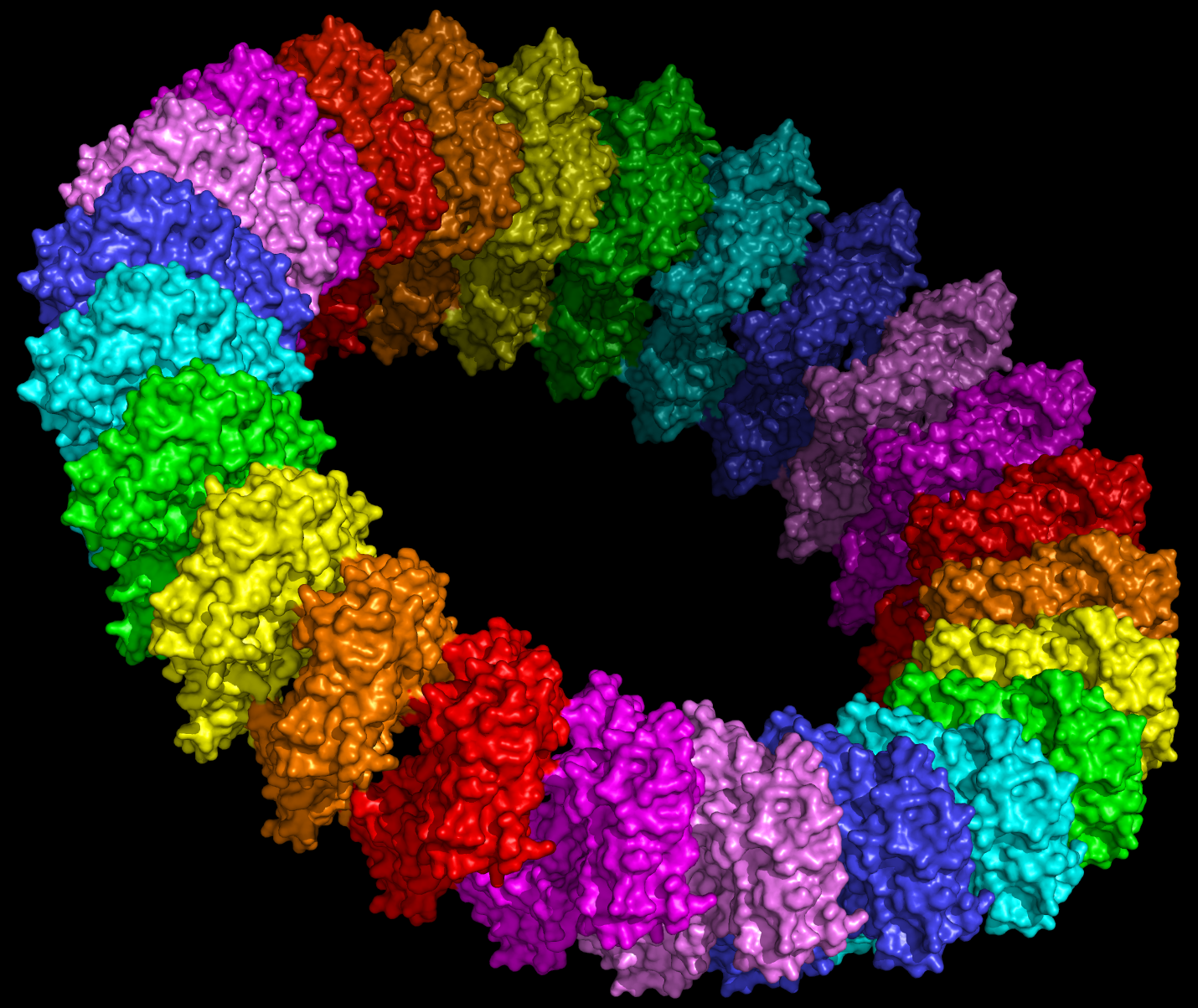
Figure 2: Molecular model of the pre-pore form of a MACPF protein based upon the structure of pneunolysin.

== Control of MACPF proteins ==
Complement regulatory proteins such as CD59 function as MAC inhibitors and prevent inappropriate activity of complement against self cells (Figure 3). Biochemical studies have revealed the peptide sequences in C8α and C9 that bind to CD59. Analysis of the MACPF domain structures reveals that these sequences map to the second cluster of helices that unfurl to span the membrane. It is therefore suggested that CD59 directly inhibits the MAC by interfering with conformational change in one of the membrane spanning regions.

Other proteins that bind to the MAC include C8γ. This protein belongs to the lipocalin family and interacts with C8α. The binding site on C8α is known, however, the precise role of C8γ in the MAC remains to be understood.

Proteins that bind MACPF domains

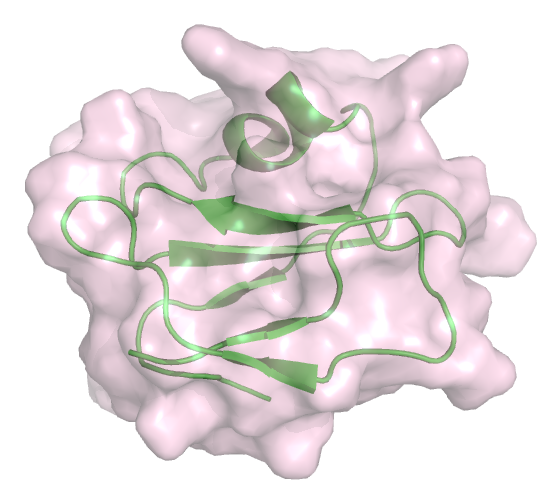
Figure 3: NMR structure of CD59. .

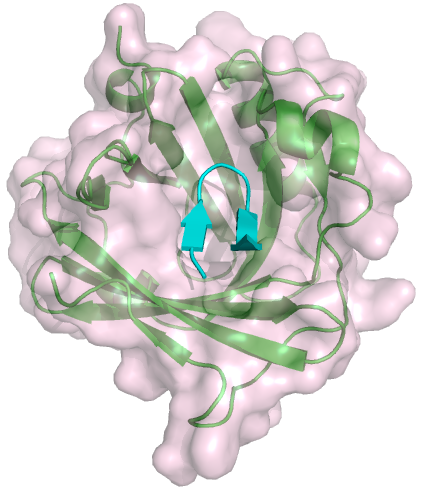
Figure 3: Crystal structure of C8γ (green) with peptide from C8α (cyan). .

== Role in human disease ==
Deficiency of C9, or other components of the MAC results in an increased susceptibility to diseases caused by gram-negative bacteria such as meningococcal meningitis. Overactivity of MACPF proteins can also cause disease. Most notably, deficiency of the MAC inhibitor CD59 results in an overactivity of complement and Paroxysmal nocturnal hemoglobinuria.

Perforin deficiency results in the commonly fatal disorder familial hemophagocytic lymphohistiocytosis (FHL or HLH). This disease is characterised by an overactivation of lymphocytes which results in cytokine mediated organ damage.

The MACPF protein DBCCR1 may function as a tumor suppressor in bladder cancer.

== Human proteins containing this domain ==
C6; C7; C8A; C8B; C9; FAM5B; FAM5C; MPEG1; PRF1
