= Phlegmon =

- Other names: Inflammation
- Causes: Bacterial infection, acute pancreatitis
- Differential diagnosis: Abscess

A phlegmon is a localized area of acute inflammation of the soft tissues. It is a descriptive term which may be used for inflammation related to a bacterial infection or non-infectious causes (e.g. pancreatitis). Most commonly, it is used in contradistinction to a "walled-off" pus-filled collection (abscess). A phlegmon is inherently dangerous due to its diffuse, uncontained nature; if left untreated, it may either be successfully localized by the immune system to form an abscess, or it may rapidly spread and lead to extensive tissue destruction (necrosis), gangrene, and life-threatening systemic infection (sepsis). A phlegmon can localize anywhere in the body. The Latin term phlegmōn is from Ancient Greek φλέγω (phlégō) 'burn'.

== Signs and symptoms ==
As with any form of inflammation, phlegmon presents with inflammatory signs dolor (localized pain), calor (increase local tissue temperature), rubor (skin redness/hyperemia), tumor (either clear or non-clear bordered tissue swelling), functio laesa (diminish affected function). There may be systemic signs of infection, such as fever, general fatigue, chills, sweating, headache, loss of appetite.

== Cause ==
Commonly caused by bacterial infection, as in the case of cellulitis or diverticulitis. Non-infectious causes of phlegmon include acute pancreatitis, where inflammation is caused by leaking of pancreatic digestive enzymes into the surrounding tissues.

Factors affecting the development of phlegmon are virulence of bacteria and immunity strength.

== Diagnosis ==
In modern medicine, phlegmon is mostly used descriptively in the fields of surgery/surgical pathology and medical imaging. The ultrasound and CT imaging findings of phlegmon are those of focal tissue edema, with no loculated fluid collection to suggest the formation of an abscess.

== Treatment ==
Since phlegmon describes an area of inflammation, and not a specific disease process, the treatment depends on the cause and severity of the inflammation. Bacterial infections such as cellulitis may be treated by antibiotic therapy, depending on the severity.

== See also ==
- Cellulitis
