= Leiner's disease =

- Specialty: Dermatology

Leiner's disease is a systemic disease, a skin disorder and extends to erythroderma, typically diagnosed in early infancy. Leiner's disease is characterized by a long-lasting seborrhea dermatitis associated with increased likelihood to infection. Other characterizations found on newborns with Leiner's disease are a patch or a large patch of red skin normally on the bottom and spreads to the rest of the body. This disease is also listed as a "rare disease", meaning that a small percent of the population, fewer than 200,000 people in the United States, will have this disorder.

== Symptoms ==
Symptoms include severe seborrheic dermatitis of the scalp, severe diarrhea, recurrent local and systemic infection, central nervous system problems, and failure to thrive. Other symptoms also include scaling on the trunk and limbs, red patches of skin on parts of the body that bend, fevers, reduced blood protein levels, thick red skin patches, peeling of the skin, itching, corneal ulcers. wasting of the lymph nodes, underdeveloped lymphatics, anemia, wasting, and nervous system deficiency. The disease may then spread to the rest of the epidermis with the appearance of crusty, dry, moist or greasy scaling on the scalp. Scaling could also appear behind the ears, nose or eyebrows, or around the mouth; peeling of the skin may also happen in these areas. If left untreated, the skin infections will cause loss of protein or electrolytes. Leiner's Disease may also be accompanied by a systemic reaction that is most evident in its gastrointestinal manifestation.

It is caused by a deficit of the complement protein, C5; however, case reports have described it in relation to deficits in either C3 or C4.

== Cause ==
The exact cause of Leiner disease remains unknown but biotin deficiency linked to Complement component 5 (a protein) coded by the C5 gene plays a role.

== Diagnosis ==
This disease is often found during the first two months of an infant's life, breast-fed infants with a higher chance. Male and female infants are affected equally.

== Treatment ==
Hospitalization for the diseased person is suggested because of the controlled environment because it may prevent nutritional deficiencies and skin infections. A decrease in severity of symptoms usually happens after a few weeks when treated redness and scaliness usually do not recur. In 10 percent of cases, the result of uncontrolled infections or severe electrolyte loss may be fatal.

== Epidemiology ==
The cause of this disease is unknown; some infants may have a severe case, others may have immunodeficiency.

== See also ==
- List of cutaneous conditions
- Staphylococcal scalded skin syndrome
