= Complement membrane attack complex =

Protein complex

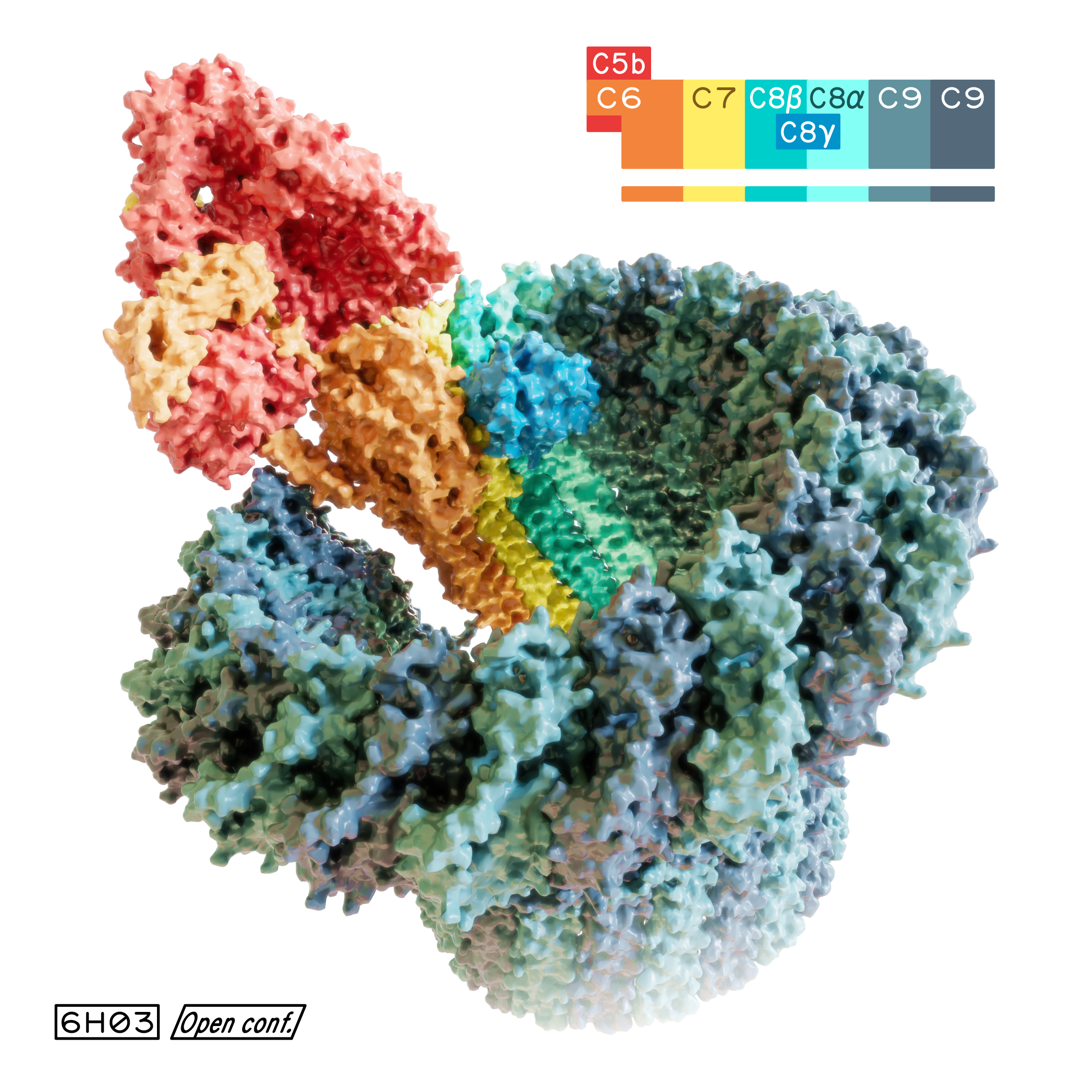
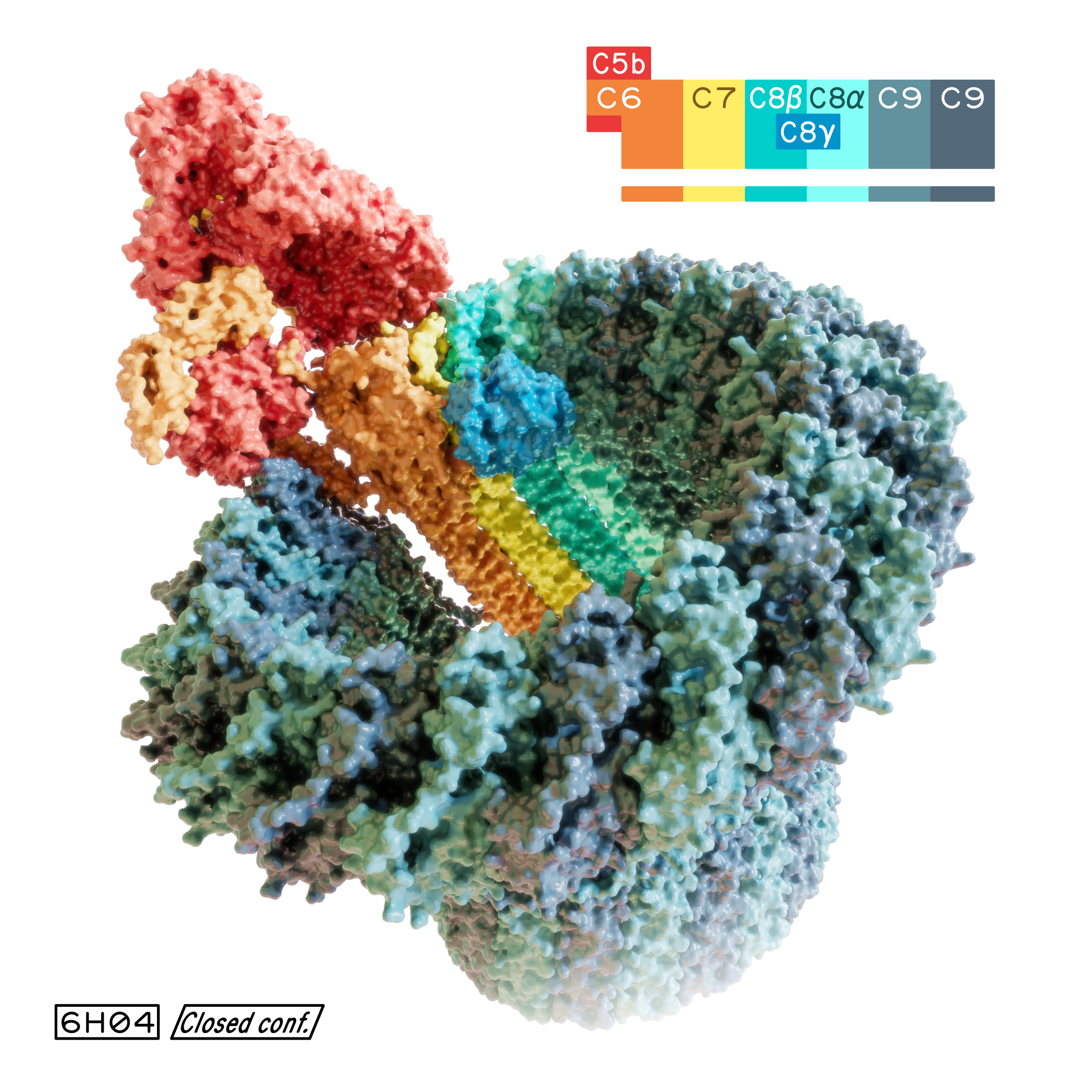
The molecular surface of the MAC in both open (left) and closed (right) conformations

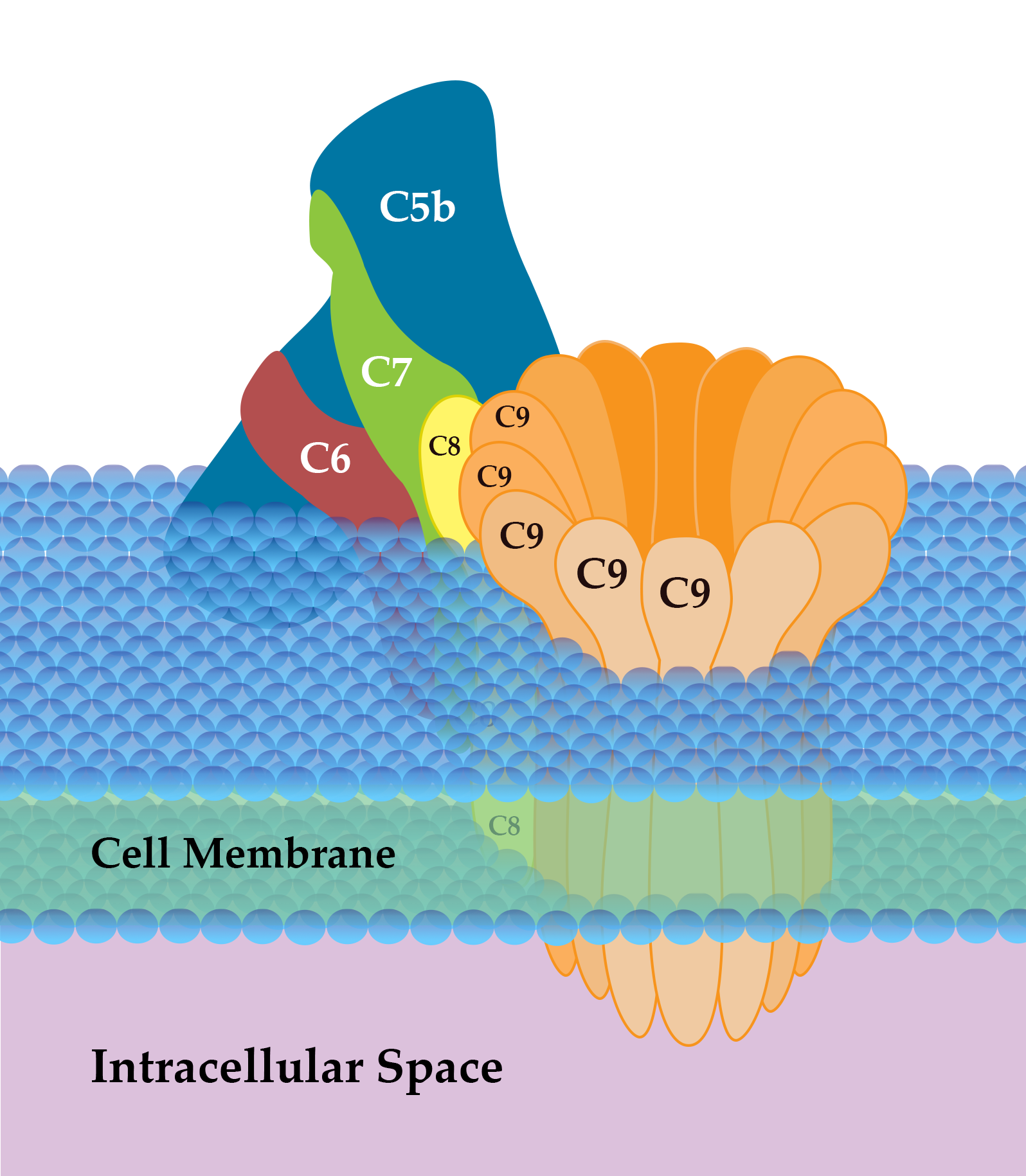
Membrane attack complex (Terminal complement complex C5b-9)

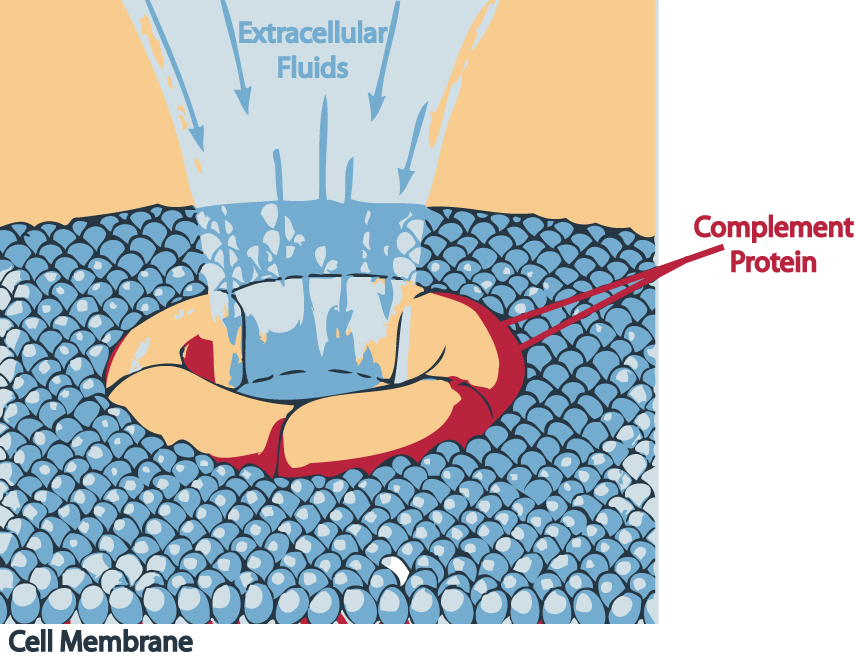
A membrane attack complex attached to a pathogenic cell

The membrane attack complex (MAC) or terminal complement complex (TCC) is a complex of proteins typically formed on the surface of pathogen cell membranes as a result of the activation of the host's complement system, and as such is an effector of the immune system. Antibody-mediated complement activation leads to MAC deposition on the surface of infected cells. Assembly of the MAC leads to pores that disrupt the cell membrane of target cells, leading to cell lysis and death.

The MAC is composed of the complement components C5b, C6, C7, C8 and several C9 molecules.

A number of proteins participate in the assembly of the MAC. Freshly activated C5b binds to C6 to form a C5b-6 complex, then to C7 forming the C5b-6-7 complex. The C5b-6-7 complex binds to C8, which is composed of three chains (alpha, beta, and gamma), thus forming the C5b-6-7-8 complex. C5b-6-7-8 subsequently binds to C9 and acts as a catalyst in the polymerization of C9.

== Structure and function ==
MAC is composed of a complex of four complement proteins (C5b, C6, C7, and C8) that bind to the outer surface of the plasma membrane, and many copies of a fifth protein (C9) that hook up to one another, forming a ring in the membrane. C6-C9 all contain a common MACPF domain. This region is homologous to cholesterol-dependent cytolysins from Gram-positive bacteria.

The ring structure formed by C9 is a pore in the membrane that allows free diffusion of molecules in and out of the cell. If enough pores form, the cell is no longer able to survive.

If the pre-MAC complexes of C5b-7, C5b-8 or C5b-9 do not insert into a membrane, they can form inactive complexes with Protein S (sC5b-7, sC5b-8 and sC5b-9). These fluid phase complexes do not bind to cell membranes and are ultimately scavenged by clusterin and vitronectin, two regulators of complement.

== Initiation: C5-C7 ==
Membrane attack complex

The membrane attack complex is initiated when the complement protein C5 convertase cleaves C5 into C5a and C5b. All three pathways of the complement system (classical, lectin and alternative pathways) initiate the formation of MAC.

Another complement protein, C6, binds to C5b.

The C5bC6 complex is bound by C7.

This junction alters the configuration of the protein molecules exposing a hydrophobic site on C7 that allows the C7 to insert into the phospholipid bilayer of the pathogen.

== Polymerization: C8-C9 ==
Similar hydrophobic sites on C8 and C9 molecules are exposed when they bind to the complex, so they can also insert into the bilayer.

C8 is a complex made of the two proteins C8-beta and C8 alpha-gamma.

C8 alpha-gamma has the hydrophobic area that inserts into the bilayer. C8 alpha-gamma induces the polymerization of 10-16 molecules of C9 into a pore-forming structure known as the membrane attack complex.

- MAC has a hydrophobic external face allowing it to associate with the lipid bilayer.
- MAC has a hydrophilic internal face to allow the passage of water.

Multiple molecules of C9 can join spontaneously in concentrated solution to form polymers of C9. These polymers can also form a tube-like structure.

== Inhibition ==
CD59 acts to inhibit the complex. This exists on body cells to protect them from MAC. A rare condition, paroxysmal nocturnal haemoglobinuria, results in red blood cells that lack CD59. These cells can, therefore, be lysed by MAC. Inhibition of MAC has been shown to reduce inflammation and neuroaxonal loss at 72 hours post-Traumatic Brain Injury (TBI) event, potentially preventing neurological damage, especially in cases with acquired sepsis or respiratory failure.

== Pathology ==
Deficiencies of C5 to C9 components do not lead to a generalized susceptibility to infections but only to an increased susceptibility to Neisseria infections, since Neisseria have a thin cell wall and little to no glycocalyx.

== See also ==
- Paroxysmal nocturnal haemoglobinuria
- Perforin
- Pore-forming toxin
- Terminal complement pathway deficiency
