= Functio laesa =

Loss of organ function

Functio laesa, simply known as dysfunction is a term used in medicine to refer to a loss of function or a disturbance of function.

It was identified as the fifth sign of acute inflammation by Galen, who added it to the four signs identified by Celsus (tumor, rubor, calor, and dolor).

The attribution to Galen is disputed, and has variously been attributed to Thomas Sydenham and Rudolf Virchow.
