= Complement component 5 =

Protein found in humans

C5
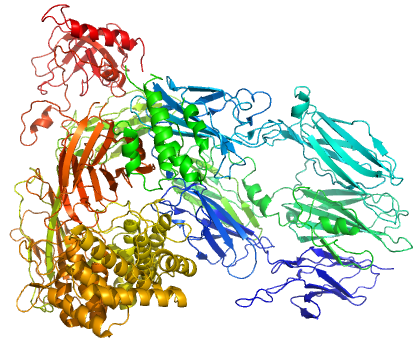

Identifiers
- Aliases: C5, C5D, C5a, C5b, CPAMD4, ECLZB, complement component 5, complement C5
- External IDs: OMIM: 120900; MGI: 96031; GeneCards: C5
Available structures
PDB	Ortholog search: PDBe RCSB
PDB	List of PDB id codes 1CFA, 1KJS, 1XWE, 3CU7, 3HQA, 3HQB, 3KLS, 3KM9, 3PRX, 3PVM, 4A5W, 4E0S, 4P39, 4UU9, 5I5K, 5HCE, 5HCC, 5HCD

Gene location (Human)
Chr.	Chromosome 9 (human)
Band	9q33.2	Start	120,932,642 bp
Band	9q33.2	End	121,075,195 bp

Gene location (Mouse)
Chr.	Chromosome 2 (mouse)
Band	2 B|2 23.22 cM	Start	34,873,343 bp
Band	2 B|2 23.22 cM	End	34,951,450 bp
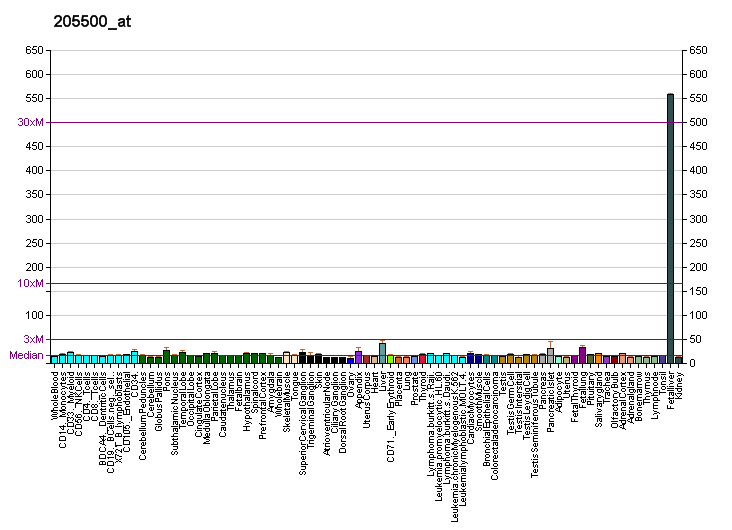
RNA expression pattern
Bgee	Human / Mouse (ortholog); Top expressed in: right lobe of liver; oocyte; body of pancreas; secondary oocyte; Achilles tendon; gonad; tibial nerve; testicle; Descending thoracic aorta; ventricular zone / Top expressed in: left lobe of liver; right lung lobe; left lung; left lung lobe; gallbladder; granulocyte; fetal liver hematopoietic progenitor cell; human fetus; neural groove; embryo; More reference expression data
BioGPS	More reference expression data
Gene ontology
Molecular function	chemokine activity; protein binding; endopeptidase inhibitor activity; signaling receptor binding
Cellular component	extracellular region; extracellular exosome; membrane attack complex; extracellular space
Biological process	G protein-coupled receptor signaling pathway; cytolysis; complement activation, alternative pathway; immune system process; complement activation; response to stress; in utero embryonic development; positive regulation of angiogenesis; chemotaxis; cell surface receptor signaling pathway; complement activation, classical pathway; positive regulation of vascular endothelial growth factor production; inflammatory response; regulation of complement activation; negative regulation of macrophage chemotaxis; negative regulation of endopeptidase activity; innate immune response; cell chemotaxis
Sources:Amigo / QuickGO
Orthologs
Databases	NCBI: entry; OMA: entry
Species	Human	Mouse
Entrez	727	15139
Ensembl	ENSG00000106804	ENSMUSG00000026874
UniProt	P01031	P06684
RefSeq (mRNA)	NM_001735; NM_001317163; NM_001317164	NM_010406
RefSeq (protein)	NP_001304092; NP_001304093; NP_001726	NP_034536
Location (UCSC)	Chr 9: 120.93 – 121.08 Mb	Chr 2: 34.87 – 34.95 Mb
PubMed search
- Wikidata
View/Edit Human	View/Edit Mouse

Complement component 5 is a protein that in humans is encoded by the C5 gene.

Complement component 5 is involved in the complement system. It is cleaved into C5a and C5b:

- C5a plays an important role in chemotaxis.
- C5b forms the first part of the complement membrane attack complex.

Deficiency is thought to cause Leiner's disease.

== Function ==
Complement component 5 is the fifth component of complement, which plays an important role in inflammatory and cell killing processes. This protein is composed of alpha and beta polypeptide chains that are linked by a disulfide bridge. An activation peptide, C5a, which is an anaphylatoxin that possesses potent spasmogenic and chemotactic activity, is derived from the alpha polypeptide via cleavage with a C5-convertase. The C5b macromolecular cleavage product can form a complex with the C6 complement component, and this complex is the basis for formation of the membrane attack complex, which includes additional complement components.

== Clinical significance ==
Mutations in this gene cause complement component 5 deficiency, a disease where patients show a propensity for severe recurrent infections. Defects in this gene have also been linked to a susceptibility to liver fibrosis and to rheumatoid arthritis.

== Therapeutic applications ==
The drug eculizumab (trade name Soliris) prevents cleavage of C5 into C5a and C5b.

== Complement system pathway ==
Membrane attack complex.
