= C8 complex =

Protein involved in the complement system

complement component 8, alpha polypeptide
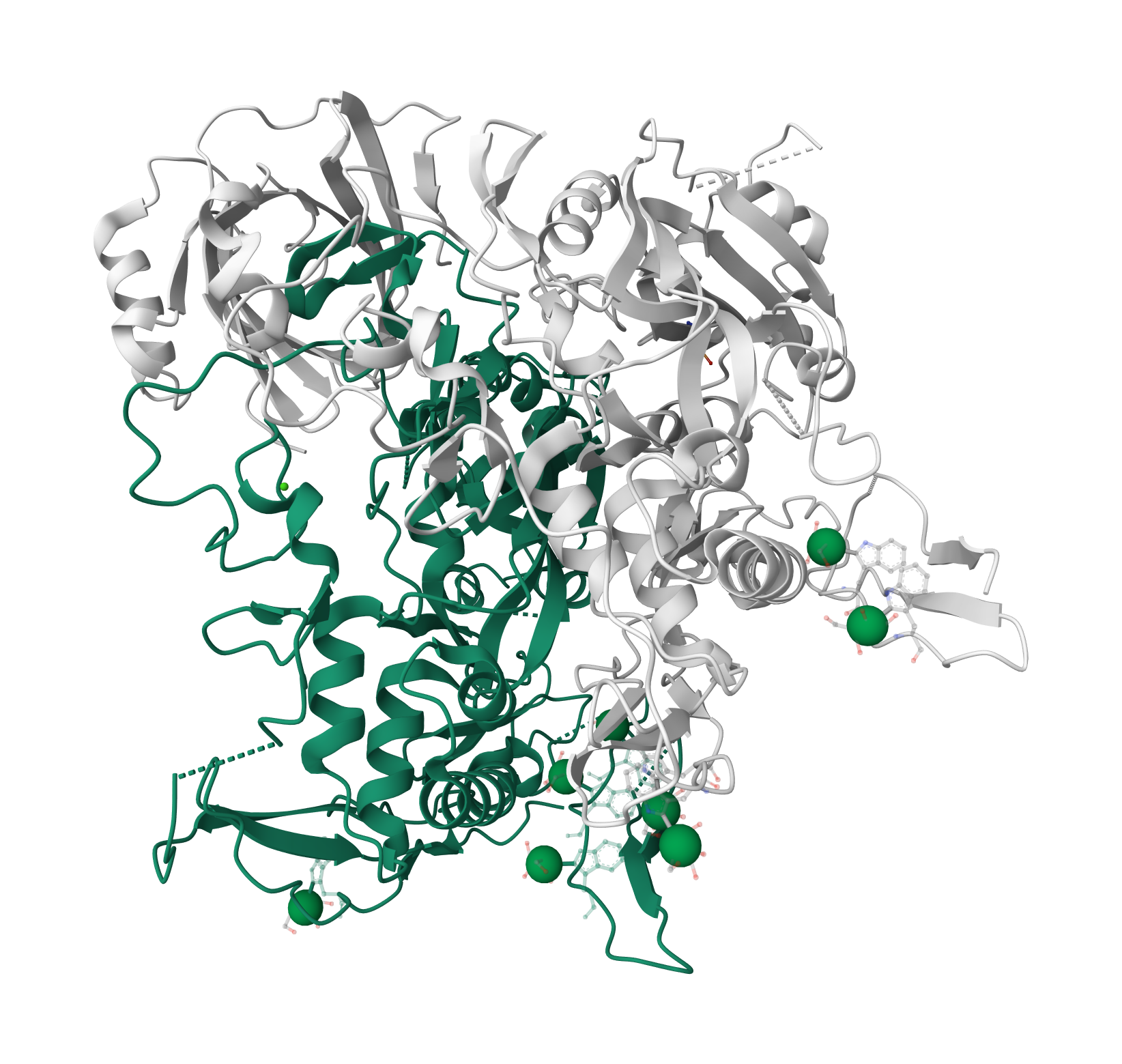

Identifiers
- Symbol: C8A
- NCBI gene: 731
- HGNC: 1352
- OMIM: 120950
- RefSeq: NM_000562
- UniProt: P07357

Other data
- Locus: Chr. 1 p36.2-22.1
Search for
- Structures: Swiss-model
- Domains: InterPro

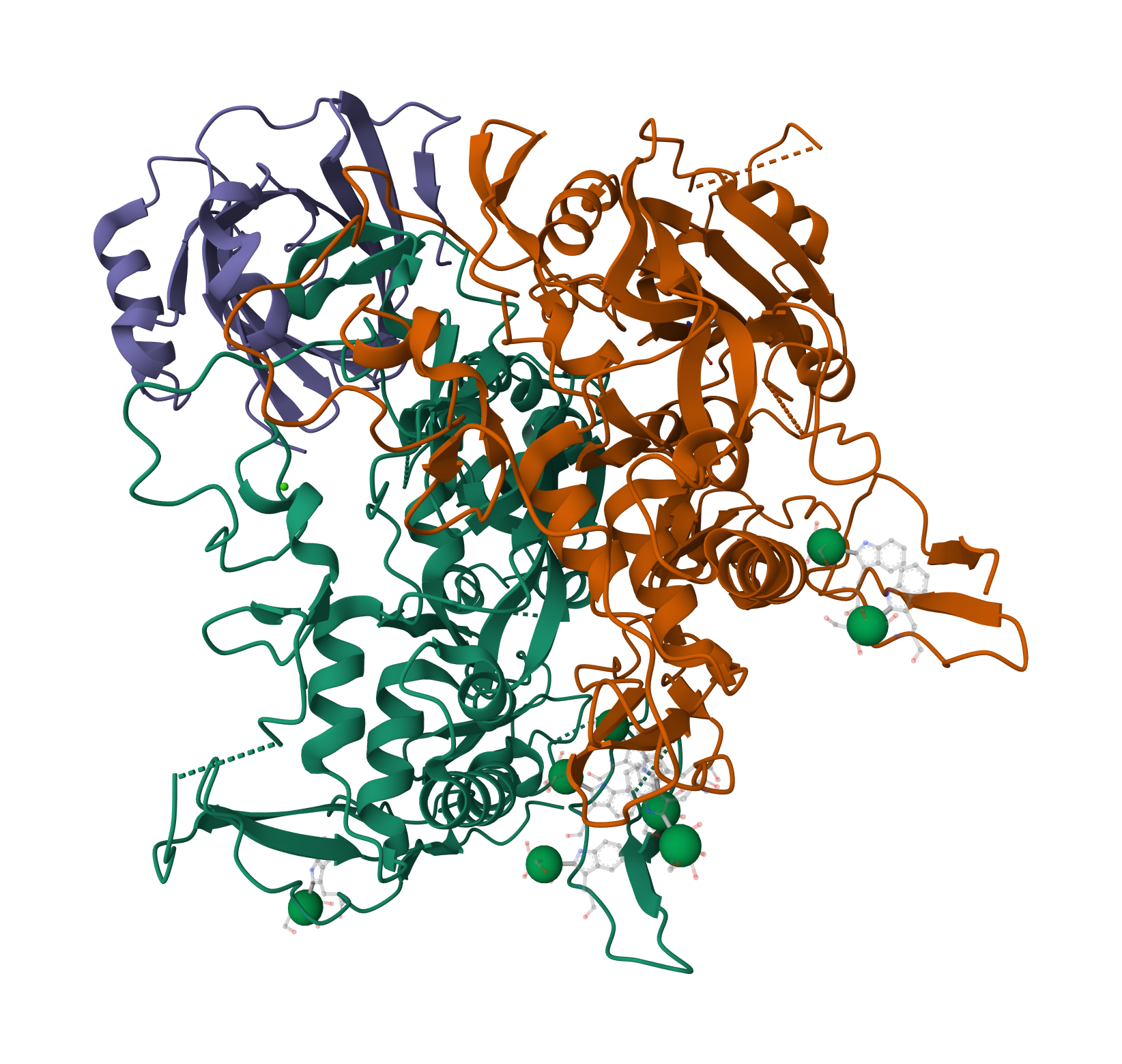
High Resolution Crystal Structure of Human Complement Component 8

Complement component 8 is a protein involved in the complement system. It is part of the membrane attack complex (MAC).

A hereditary deficiency of C8 can result in increased susceptibility to Neisseria infections, such as meningitis and gonorrhea.

Membrane attack complex. Some labels are in Polish.

complement component 8, beta polypeptide
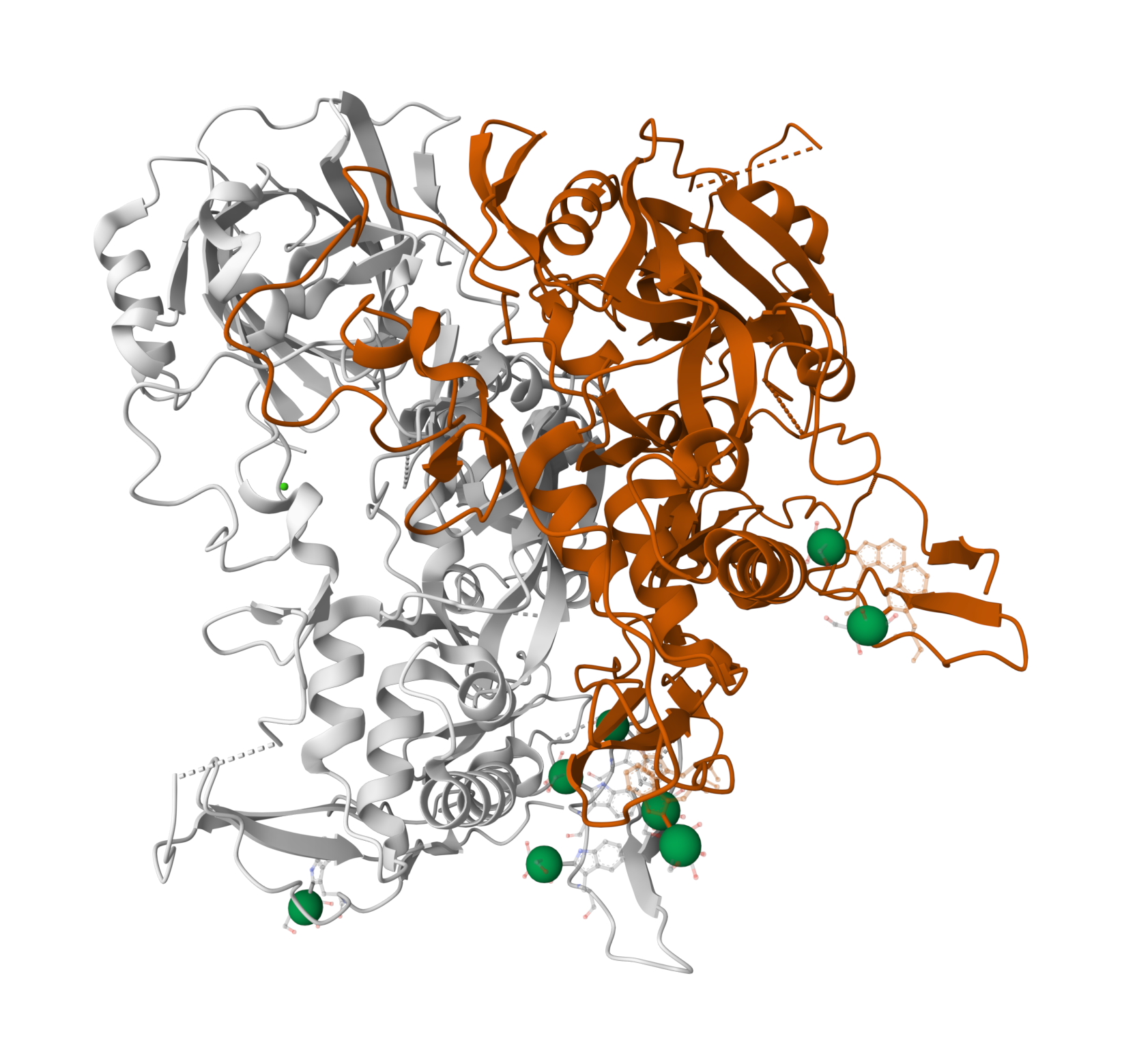

Identifiers
- Symbol: C8B
- NCBI gene: 732
- HGNC: 1353
- OMIM: 1209660
- RefSeq: NM_000066
- UniProt: P073o58

Other data
- Locus: Chr. 1 p36.2-22.1
Search for
- Structures: Swiss-model
- Domains: InterPro

complement component 8, gamma polypeptide
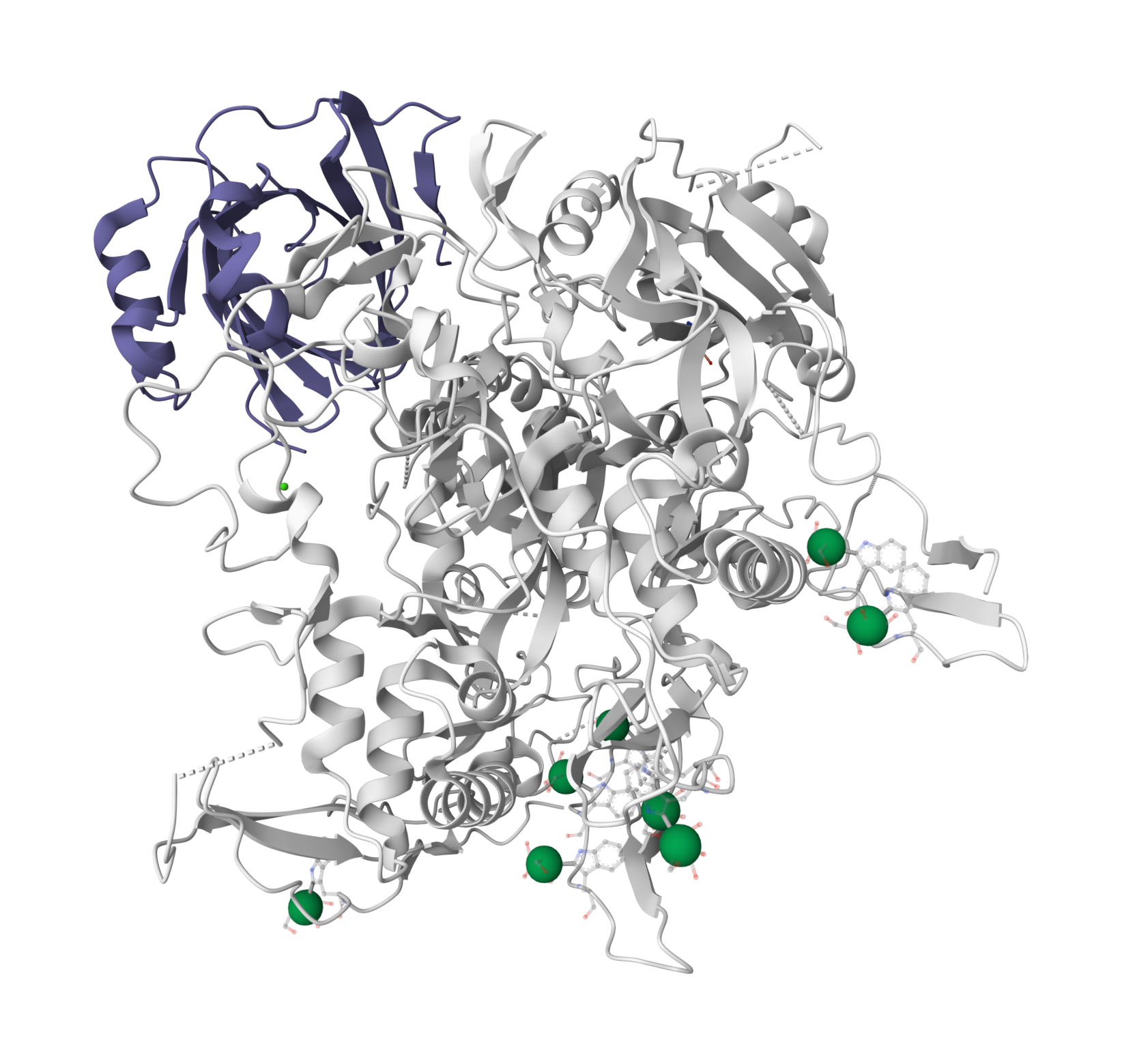

Identifiers
- Symbol: C8G
- NCBI gene: 733
- HGNC: 1354
- OMIM: 120930
- RefSeq: NM_000606
- UniProt: P07360

Other data
- Locus: Chr. 9 q34.3
Search for
- Structures: Swiss-model
- Domains: InterPro

== Structure ==
C8 is a heterotrimer; it consists of three different subunits. These are called C8 alpha, beta and gamma chains, encoded by the genes C8A, C8B and C8G respectively.
