= Complement component 7 =

Protein found in humans

C7

Identifiers
- Aliases: C7, complement component 7, complement C7
- External IDs: OMIM: 217070; MGI: 88235; GeneCards: C7
Available structures
| PDB | Ortholog search: PDBe RCSB |
| PDB | List of PDB id codes 2WCY |

Gene location (Human)
| Chr. | Chromosome 5 (human) |
| Band | 5p13.1 | Start | 40,909,492 bp |
| Band | 5p13.1 | End | 40,984,643 bp |

Gene location (Mouse)
| Chr. | Chromosome 15 (mouse) |
| Band | 15 A1|15 1.98 cM | Start | 5,018,244 bp |
| Band | 15 A1|15 1.98 cM | End | 5,093,222 bp |
RNA expression pattern
| Bgee | Human / Mouse (ortholog); Top expressed in: right ovary; superficial temporal artery; pericardium; right adrenal cortex; gastric mucosa; left adrenal gland; left adrenal cortex; gallbladder; right auricle of heart; right coronary artery / Top expressed in: zone of skin; spermatid; esophagus; lung; testicle; spermatocyte; white adipose tissue; skeletal muscle tissue; adrenal gland; quadriceps femoris muscle; More reference expression data |
| BioGPS | n/a |
Gene ontology
| Molecular function | growth factor activity |
| Cellular component | extracellular region; extracellular exosome; membrane attack complex |
| Biological process | complement activation; cytolysis; regulation of complement activation; complement activation, alternative pathway; immune response; complement activation, classical pathway; immune system process; innate immune response; cellular sodium ion homeostasis |
Sources:Amigo / QuickGO
Orthologs
| Databases | NCBI: entry; OMA: entry |
| Species | Human | Mouse |
| Entrez | 730 | 109828 |
| Ensembl | ENSG00000112936 | ENSMUSG00000079105 |
| UniProt | P10643 | D3YXF5 |
| RefSeq (mRNA) | NM_000587 | NM_001243837 |
| RefSeq (protein) | NP_000578 | NP_001230766 |
| Location (UCSC) | Chr 5: 40.91 – 40.98 Mb | Chr 15: 5.02 – 5.09 Mb |
| PubMed search |
- Wikidata
| View/Edit Human | View/Edit Mouse |

Complement component 7 is a protein involved in the complement system of the innate immune system. C7 is part of the membrane attack complex (MAC) which creates a hole on pathogen surfaces, leading to cell lysis and death.

Its primary task is to bind the C5bC6 complex together. This junction alters the configuration of the protein molecules, exposing a hydrophobic site on C7 that allows the C7 to insert into the phospholipid bilayer of the pathogen.

== See also ==
- Terminal complement pathway deficiency
