= Complement component 6 =

Protein found in humans

C6

Identifiers
- Aliases: C6, complement C6
- External IDs: OMIM: 217050; MGI: 88233; GeneCards: C6
Available structures
| PDB | Human UniProt search: PDBe RCSB |
| PDB | List of PDB id codes 3T5O, 4A5W, 4E0S |

Gene location (Human)
| Chr. | Chromosome 5 (human) |
| Band | 5p13.1 | Start | 41,142,116 bp |
| Band | 5p13.1 | End | 41,261,438 bp |

Gene location (Mouse)
| Chr. | Chromosome 15 (mouse) |
| Band | 15 A1|15 1.97 cM | Start | 4,756,657 bp |
| Band | 15 A1|15 1.97 cM | End | 4,844,449 bp |
RNA expression pattern
| Bgee | Human / Mouse (ortholog); Top expressed in: right lobe of liver; right ventricle; cardiac muscle tissue of right atrium; right uterine tube; myocardium of left ventricle; right auricle of heart; body of pancreas; bronchial epithelial cell; pancreatic ductal cell; apex of heart / Top expressed in: left lobe of liver; mesenteric lymph nodes; right lung lobe; left lung; left lung lobe; white adipose tissue; spleen; mucosa of small intestine; subcutaneous adipose tissue; embryo; More reference expression data |
| BioGPS | n/a |
Gene ontology
| Molecular function | protein binding |
| Cellular component | extracellular region; extracellular exosome; membrane attack complex |
| Biological process | positive regulation of activation of membrane attack complex; immune system process; complement activation; in utero embryonic development; cytolysis; regulation of complement activation; immune response; positive regulation of angiogenesis; complement activation, classical pathway; positive regulation of complement activation; innate immune response |
Sources:Amigo / QuickGO
Orthologs
| Databases | NCBI: entry; OMA: entry |
| Species | Human | Mouse |
| Entrez | 729 | 12274 |
| Ensembl | ENSG00000039537 | ENSMUSG00000022181 |
| UniProt | P13671 | n/a |
| RefSeq (mRNA) | NM_000065; NM_001115131 | NM_016704 |
| RefSeq (protein) | NP_000056; NP_001108603 | n/a |
| Location (UCSC) | Chr 5: 41.14 – 41.26 Mb | Chr 15: 4.76 – 4.84 Mb |
| PubMed search |
- Wikidata
| View/Edit Human | View/Edit Mouse |

Complement component 6 is a protein that in humans is encoded by the C6 gene.

Complement component 6 is a protein involved in the complement system. It is part of the membrane attack complex which can insert into the cell membrane and cause the cell to lyse.

People with C6 deficiency are prone to bacterial infection.
