= CUB domain =

Protein domain

Identifiers
- Symbol: CUB
- Pfam: PF00431
- InterPro: IPR000859
- PROSITE: PDOC00758
- SCOP2: 1sfp / SCOPe / SUPFAM
- CDD: cd00041
Available protein structures:
- Pfam: structures / ECOD
- PDB: RCSB PDB; PDBe; PDBj
- PDBsum: structure summary
- PDB: 1nziA:18-127 1nt0A:28-134 1szbB:28-134 1sppB:30-128 1sfp :30-127

CUB domain is an evolutionarily conserved protein domain. The CUB domain (for complement C1r/C1s, Uegf, Bmp1) is a structural motif of approximately 110 residues found almost exclusively in extracellular and plasma membrane-associated proteins, many of which are developmentally regulated. These proteins are involved in a diverse range of functions, including complement activation, developmental patterning, tissue repair, axon guidance and angiogenesis, cell signalling, fertilisation, haemostasis, inflammation, neurotransmission, receptor-mediated endocytosis, and tumour suppression. Many CUB-containing proteins are peptidases belonging to MEROPS peptidase families M12A (astacin) and S1A (chymotrypsin).

== Examples ==
Proteins containing a CUB domain include:

- Mammalian complement subcomponents C1s/C1r, which form the calcium-dependent complex C1, the first component of the classical pathway of the complement system.
- Cricetidae sp. (Hamster) serine protease Casp, which degrades type I and IV collagen and fibronectin in the presence of calcium.
- Mammalian complement-activating component of Ra-reactive factor (RARF), a protease that cleaves the C4 component of complement.
- Vertebrate enteropeptidase (EC 3.4.21.9), a type II membrane protein of the intestinal brush border, which activates trypsinogen.
- Vertebrate bone morphogenic protein 1 (BMP-1), a protein which induces cartilage and bone formation and expresses metalloendopeptidase activity.
- Sea urchin blastula proteins BP10 and SpAN.
- C. elegans hypothetical proteins F42A10.8 and R151.5.
- Neuropilin (A5 antigen), a calcium-independent cell adhesion molecule that functions during the formation of certain neuronal circuits.
- Fibropellins I and III from Strongylocentrotus purpuratus (Purple sea urchin).
- Mammalian hyaluronate-binding protein TSG-6 (or PS4), a serum and growth factor induced protein.
- Mammalian spermadhesins.
- Xenopus laevis embryonic protein UVS.2, which is expressed during dorsoanterior development.

Several of the above proteins consist of a catalytic domain together with several CUB domains interspersed by calcium-binding EGF domains.

Spermadhesin is a subdivision of the CUB domain family and forms a major component of the mammalian seminal fluid. Spermadhesins are 110–133 amino acid polypeptides. The binding activity of spermadhesins, e.g. heparin and carbohydrate binding, enables their central role in promoting attachment of the spermatozoa to carbohydrate groups on the glycoproteins found on the surface of oocytes. The spermadhesins from pigs, bulls and stallions show 40–98% similarity in their amino acid sequences and all possess a disulphide bond between adjacent cysteine residues. The porcine spermadhesin polypeptides are coded by five closely linked genes. Bovine spermadhesin relies on a significantly lower number of genes with only two being associated with expression of this protein in bovine seminal fluid. Redundant genetic coding for spermadhesins have been observed in chimpanzees, dogs, and humans. The region correlating to spermadhesin genes in rat and mice DNA is void of any spermadhesin code. These variations in expression and genetic coding of spermadhesins are seen to result from evolutionary adjustments in genes as a consequence of mutations and deletions in genetic material.

Some CUB domains appear to be involved in oligomerisation and/or recognition of substrates and binding partners. For example, in the complement proteases, the CUB domains mediate dimerisation and binding to collagen-like regions of target proteins (e.g. C1q for C1r/C1s). The structure of CUB domains consists of a beta-sandwich with a jelly-roll fold. Almost all CUB domains contain four conserved cysteines that probably form two disulphide bridges (C1-C2, C3-C4). The CUB1 domains of C1s and Map19 have calcium-binding sites.

Human genes encoding proteins containing this domain include:

- ATRN, ATRNL1, BMP1,
- C1R, C1RL, C1S, CDCP2, CSMD1, CSMD2, CSMD3, CUBN, CUZD1,
- DCBLD1, DCBLD2, DMBT1, DREG,
- GPR126,
- KREMEN1, KREMEN2,
- LRP10, LRP12, LRP3,
- MASP1, MASP2, MFRP,
- NETO1, NETO2, NRP1, NRP2,
- OVCH1, OVCH2,
- PCOLCE, PCOLCE2, PDGFC, PDGFD, PRSS7,
- RAMP,
- SCUBE1, SCUBE2, SCUBE3, SEZ6, SEZ6L, SEZ6L2, ST14,
- TLL1, TLL2, TMPRSS7, TNFAIP6
- psk-2
