= Sushi domain =

Protein domain

Sushi domain (SCR/CCP)

Identifiers
- Symbol: Sushi
- Pfam: PF00084
- InterPro: IPR000436
- CATH: 1g4g
- SCOP2: 1hfi / SCOPe / SUPFAM
- CDD: cd00033
Available protein structures:
- PDB: 1hfh :870-926 1hfi :870-926 1cklF:99-157 1y8eA:86-143 1g40A:86-143 1g44C:86-143 1ridB:86-143 1e5gA:86-143 1h2qP:163-220 1ok2A:163-220 1ojyB:163-220 1h03P:163-220 1h04P:163-220 1ok1B:163-220 1h2pP:163-220 1upnE:163-220 1ojwB:163-220 1ojvA:163-220 1ok3A:163-220 1ok9B:163-220 1nwvA:163-220 1uotP:163-220 2a55A:113-170 1gkgA:1004-1061 1gknA:1004-1061 1gopA:1004-1061 1ppqA:1004-1061 1srzA:99-156 1ss2A:99-156 1qubA:84-137 1c1zA:84-137 1fhcA:1109-1163 1hr4A:162-223 1vvd :148-201 1vvc :148-201 1vve :148-201 1hcc :931-984 1ghqC:23-82 1ly2A:23-82 1kovA:389-442 1zjkA:300-361 1gpzB:309-371 1q3xA:366-430 1md7A:376-447 1md8A:376-447 1elvA:359-421 1z92B:24-82 1ilnA:24-82 1ilmA:24-82 2b5iD:24-82 IPR000436 PF00084 (ECOD; PDBsum)
- AlphaFold: IPR000436; PF00084

Sushi domain is an evolutionarily conserved protein domain. It is also known as complement control protein (CCP) modules or short consensus repeats (SCR). The name derives from the visual similarity of the domain to nigiri sushi when the primary structure is drawn showing the loops created by the disulfide bonds.

Sushi domains exist in a wide variety of complement and adhesion proteins. The structure is known for this domain; it is based on a beta-sandwich arrangement – one face made up of three β-strands hydrogen-bonded to form a triple-stranded region at its centre, and the other face formed from two separate β-strands.

CD21 (also called C3d receptor, CR2, Epstein–Barr virus receptor or EBV-R) is the receptor for EBV and for C3d, C3dg and iC3b. Complement components may activate B cells through CD21. CD21 is part of a large signal-transduction complex that also involves CD19, CD81, and Leu13.

Some of the proteins in this group are responsible for the molecular basis of the blood group antigens, surface markers on the outside of the red blood cell membrane. Most of these markers are proteins, but some are carbohydrates attached to lipids or proteins. Complement decay-accelerating factor (Antigen CD55) belongs to the Cromer blood group system and is associated with Cr(a), Dr(a), Es(a), Tc(a/b/c), Wd(a), WES(a/b), IFC and UMC antigens. Complement receptor type 1 (C3b/C4b receptor) (Antigen CD35) belongs to the Knops blood group system and is associated with Kn(a/b), McC(a), Sl(a) and Yk(a) antigens.

== Subfamilies ==
- Selectins InterPro: IPR002396
  - CD62E
  - CD62L
  - CD62P

== Examples ==
Human genes encoding proteins containing this domain include:

- AGC1, APOH,
- BCAN, BF,
- C1R, C1S, C2, C4BPA, C4BPB, C6, C7, CD46, CD55, CFB, CFH, CFHR1, CFHR2, CFHR3, CFHR4, CFHR5, CR1, CR1L, CR2, CSMD1, CSMD2, CSMD3, CSPG3,
- DAF,
- F13B, FHR4, GABBR1,
- HP,
- IL2RA,
- KIAA0247,
- MASP1, MASP2,
- PAPPA, PAPPA2, psk-3,
- RAMP,
- SEL-OB, SELE, SELL, SELP, SEZ6, SEZ6L, SEZ6L2, SNED1, SRPX, SRPX2, SUSD1, SUSD2, SUSD4, SVEP1, SEZ6L2,
- TAOK1, TPO, VCAN
