= LHR (disambiguation) =

LHR is the IATA code for Heathrow Airport, England, UK.

LHR may also refer to:

== Science and technology ==
- Lite Hash Rate, an anti-cryptocurrency-mining technology in the 2021 GPU GeForce 30 series
- Long homologous repeats, genetic sequences
- Lung-to-head ratio, a factor in the treatment of congenital diaphragmatic hernia
- Luteinizing hormone receptor, a transmembrane receptor in reproductive tissues

== Other uses ==
- Light Horse Regiment, former name of the armoured regiment of the South African Army

== See also ==
- L&HR (disambiguation)
