= L&HR =

L&HR may refer to:

- Lakeside and Haverthwaite Railway, a heritage railway in Cumbria, England
- Lehigh and Hudson River Railway, a former railroad in northwestern New Jersey, United States

== See also ==
- LHR (disambiguation)
