= Astacin =

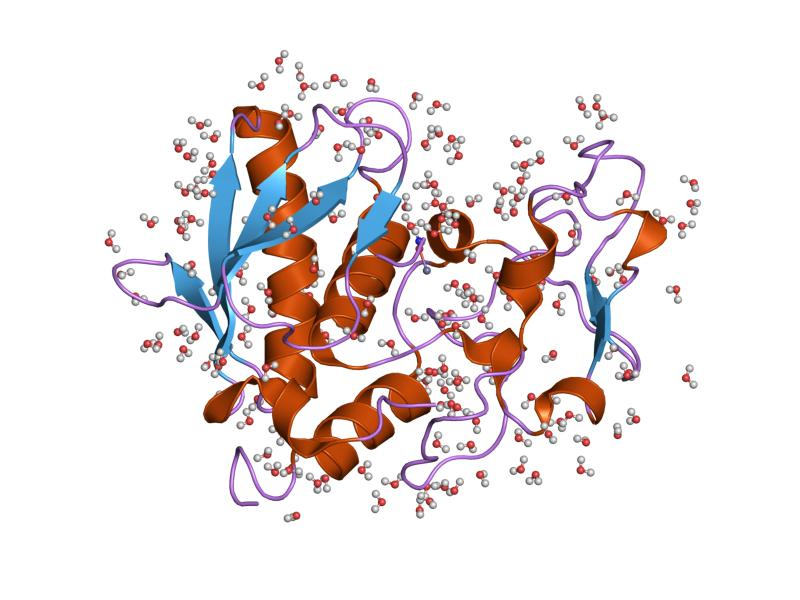
- structure of astacin with a hydroxamic acid inhibitor

Identifiers
- Symbol: Astacin
- Pfam: PF01400
- Pfam clan: CL0126
- InterPro: IPR001506
- PROSITE: PDOC00129
- MEROPS: M12
- SCOP2: 1ast / SCOPe / SUPFAM
- CDD: cd04280
Available protein structures:
- PDB: IPR001506 PF01400 (ECOD; PDBsum)
- AlphaFold: IPR001506; PF01400

astacin

Identifiers
- EC no.: 3.4.24.21
- CAS no.: 143179-21-9

Databases
- BRENDA: enzyme data
- ExPASy: NiceZyme view
- KEGG: enzyme entry
- MetaCyc: metabolic pathway
- Rhea: reactions
- PDB structures: RCSB PDB PDBe PDBsum
- Gene Ontology: AmiGO / QuickGO
Search
- PMC: articles
- PubMed: articles
- NCBI: proteins

Astacins are a family of multidomain metalloendopeptidases which are either secreted or membrane-anchored. These metallopeptidases belong to the MEROPS peptidase family M12, subfamily M12A (astacin family, clan MA(M)). The protein fold of the peptidase domain for members of this family resembles that of thermolysin, the type example for clan MA and the predicted active site residues for members of this family and thermolysin occur in the motif HEXXH.

The astacin family of metalloendopeptidases (EC 3.4.24.21) encompasses a range of proteins found in hydra to humans, in mature and developmental systems. Their functions include activation of growth factors, degradation of polypeptides, and processing of extracellular proteins. The proteins are synthesised with N-terminal signal and pro-enzyme sequences, and many contain multiple domains C-terminal to the protease domain. They are either secreted from cells, or are associated with the plasma membrane.

The astacin molecule adopts a kidney shape, with a deep active-site cleft between its N- and C-terminal domains. The zinc ion, which lies at the bottom of the cleft, exhibits a unique penta-coordinated mode of binding, involving 3 histidine residues, a tyrosine and a water molecule (which is also bound to the carboxylate side chain of Glu93). The N-terminal domain comprises 2 alpha-helices and a 5-stranded beta-sheet. The overall topology of this domain is shared by the archetypal zinc-endopeptidase thermolysin. Astacin protease domains also share common features with serralysins, matrix metalloendopeptidases, and snake venom proteases; they cleave peptide bonds in polypeptides such as insulin B chain and bradykinin, and in proteins such as casein and gelatin; and they have arylamidase activity.

== History ==
In 1965 R. Zwilling observed during his doctorate work that the oncosphaere of the mouse tapeworm Hymenolepis diminuta easily hatched in vitro in the presence of the digestive fluid of its intermediate host Tenebrio molitor (Meal beetle). After the digestion of its protein shell the oncosphaere started its typical hook movements. The same effect could not be achieved with bovine trypsin which raised the question, by what different proteases invertebrate animals might digest their protein diet. This was unknown at that time. From the small Tenebrio beetles sufficient digestive fluid for extended studies could not be obtained. But from large crayfish cultures (Astacus astacus) it was possible to gather up to 100-200 ml gastric juice from the living animals by introducing a glass capillary through the proboscis into the cardia (stomach). From the resulting darkbrown fluid the proteolytic fractions were purified by gel-filtration, anion exchange chromatography and affinity chromatography to a high degree. The freeze-dried material obtained in this way has remained the basis for all further studies on crayfish astacin, including the elucidation of the amino acid sequence, genomic organization and spatial configuration. On the basis of its primary structure one proteolytic fraction from Astacus obviously represented an unknown protein and was named Astacin. In addition to astacin the crayfish possesses an invertebrate trypsin, but no pepsin. Soon afterwards Wozney et al. have shown that the astacin sequence is inserted into the human bone morphogenetic protein (BMP) with significant homology.

== Astacin family members ==
Proteins containing the astacin domain include:

- Astacin-like metallo-endopeptidase (ASTL)
- Bone morphogenetic protein 1 (BMP1)
- Meprin A subunit alpha (MEP1A)
- Meprin A subunit beta (MEP1B)
- Tolloid-like protein 1 (TLL1)
- Tolloid-like protein 2 (TLL2)
