= SCUBE1 =

Protein-coding gene in the species Homo sapiens

Identifiers
- Aliases: SCUBE1, signal peptide, CUB domain and EGF like domain containing 1
- External IDs: OMIM: 611746; MGI: 1890616; GeneCards: SCUBE1

Gene location (Human)
Chr.	Chromosome 22 (human)
Band	22q13.2	Start	43,197,280 bp
Band	22q13.2	End	43,343,372 bp

Gene location (Mouse)
Chr.	Chromosome 15 (mouse)
Band	15|15 E1	Start	83,489,200 bp
Band	15|15 E1	End	83,609,222 bp
RNA expression pattern
Bgee	Human / Mouse (ortholog); Top expressed in: gastric mucosa; tibia; tibial nerve; left ovary; sural nerve; ganglionic eminence; right ovary; ventricular zone; gonad; Skeletal muscle tissue of rectus abdominis / Top expressed in: genital tubercle; habenula; visual cortex; superior frontal gyrus; primary visual cortex; third ventricle; urethra; female urethra; male urethra; infundibular recess; More reference expression data
BioGPS	n/a
Gene ontology
Molecular function	calcium ion binding; identical protein binding; protein heterodimerization activity
Cellular component	extracellular region; cell surface; extrinsic component of plasma membrane; membrane; external side of plasma membrane; extracellular space; plasma membrane
Biological process	endothelial cell differentiation; blood coagulation; inflammatory response; protein homooligomerization; post-embryonic development; adult heart development; signal transduction; cell differentiation; positive regulation of smoothened signaling pathway; extracellular matrix disassembly
Sources:Amigo / QuickGO
Orthologs
Databases	NCBI: entry; OMA: entry
Species	Human	Mouse
Entrez	80274	64706
Ensembl	ENSG00000159307	ENSMUSG00000016763
UniProt	Q8IWY4	Q6NZL8
RefSeq (mRNA)	NM_173050	NM_001271472; NM_001271473; NM_022723
RefSeq (protein)	NP_766638; NP_766638.2	NP_001258401; NP_001258402; NP_073560
Location (UCSC)	Chr 22: 43.2 – 43.34 Mb	Chr 15: 83.49 – 83.61 Mb
PubMed search
- Wikidata
View/Edit Human	View/Edit Mouse

Signal peptide, CUB domain and EGF like domain containing 1 is a protein that in humans is encoded by the SCUBE1 gene.

== Function ==
This gene encodes a cell surface glycoprotein that is a member of the SCUBE (signal peptide, CUB domain, EGF (epidermal growth factor)-like protein) family. Family members have an amino-terminal signal peptide, nine copies of EGF-like repeats and a CUB domain at the carboxyl terminus. This protein is expressed in platelet and endothelial cells and may play an important role in vascular biology.
