= Complement receptor 1 =

Protein found in humans

CR1
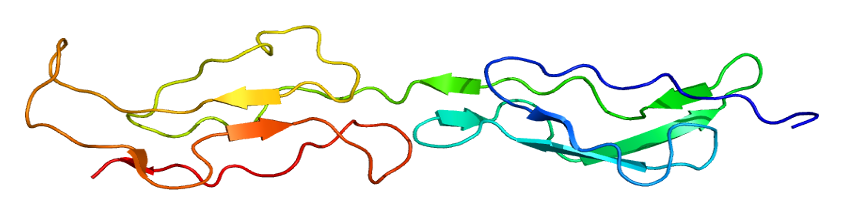

Identifiers
- Aliases: CR1, C3BR, C4BR, CD35, KN, complement component 3b/4b receptor 1 (Knops blood group), complement C3b/C4b receptor 1 (Knops blood group)
- External IDs: OMIM: 120620; GeneCards: CR1
Available structures
| PDB | Human UniProt search: PDBe RCSB |
| PDB | List of PDB id codes 1GKG, 1GKN, 1PPQ, 2Q7Z, 2MCY, 2MCZ, 5FO9 |

Gene location (Human)
| Chr. | Chromosome 1 (human) |
| Band | 1q32.2 | Start | 207,496,147 bp |
| Band | 1q32.2 | End | 207,641,765 bp |
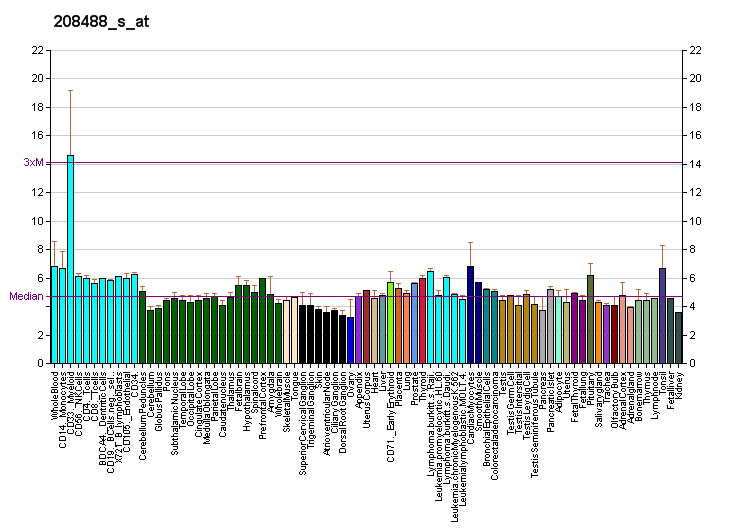

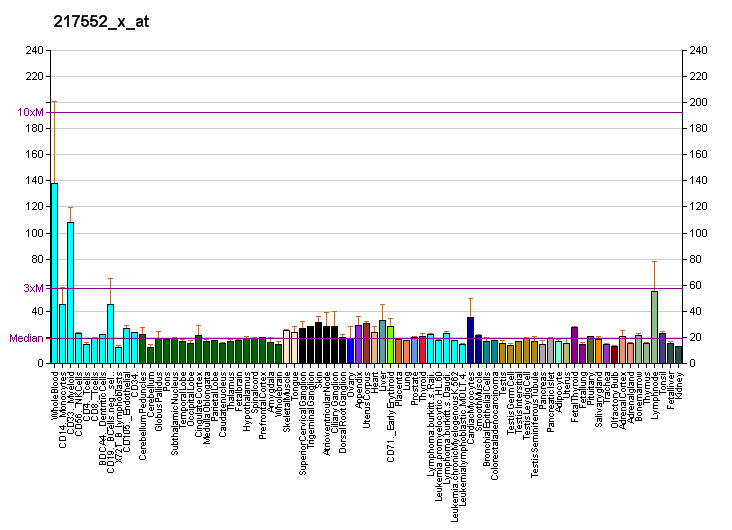

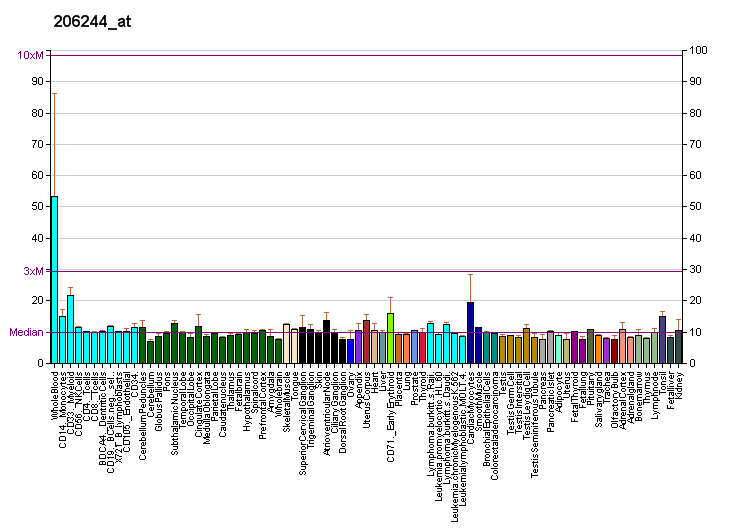
RNA expression pattern
| Bgee | Human / Mouse (ortholog); Top expressed in: blood; monocyte; spleen; appendix; lymph node; bone marrow; trabecular bone; granulocyte; superficial temporal artery; bone marrow cell / n/a; More reference expression data |
| BioGPS | More reference expression data |
Gene ontology
| Molecular function | virus receptor activity; complement component C3b receptor activity; complement component C4b receptor activity; complement component C3b binding; complement component C4b binding |
| Cellular component | integral component of membrane; membrane; plasma membrane; integral component of plasma membrane; cell surface; extracellular exosome; secretory granule membrane; ficolin-1-rich granule membrane |
| Biological process | negative regulation of complement activation, classical pathway; immune system process; positive regulation of serine-type endopeptidase activity; negative regulation of complement activation, alternative pathway; complement activation, classical pathway; viral entry into host cell; viral process; negative regulation of serine-type endopeptidase activity; regulation of complement activation; complement receptor mediated signaling pathway; innate immune response; neutrophil degranulation; regulation of regulatory T cell differentiation |
Sources:Amigo / QuickGO
Orthologs
| Databases | NCBI: entry; OMA: entry |
| Species | Human | Mouse |
| Entrez | 1378 | n/a |
| Ensembl | ENSG00000203710 | n/a |
| UniProt | P17927 | n/a |
| RefSeq (mRNA) | NM_000573; NM_000651; NM_001381851 | n/a |
| RefSeq (protein) | NP_000564; NP_000642; NP_001368780 | n/a |
| Location (UCSC) | Chr 1: 207.5 – 207.64 Mb | n/a |
| PubMed search | | n/a |
- Wikidata
| View/Edit Human |

Complement receptor type 1 (CR1) also known as C3b/C4b receptor or CD35 (cluster of differentiation 35) is a protein that in humans is encoded by the CR1 gene.

This gene is a member of the regulators of complement activation (RCA) family and is located in the 'cluster RCA' region of chromosome 1. The gene encodes a monomeric single-pass type I membrane glycoprotein found on erythrocytes, leukocytes, glomerular podocytes, hyalocytes, and splenic follicular dendritic cells. The Knops blood group system is a system of antigens located on this protein. The protein mediates cellular binding to particles and immune complexes that have activated complement. Decreases in expression of this protein and/or mutations in its gene have been associated with gallbladder carcinomas, mesangiocapillary glomerulonephritis, systemic lupus erythematosus and sarcoidosis. Mutations in this gene have also been associated with a reduction in Plasmodium falciparum rosetting, conferring protection against severe malaria. Alternate allele-specific splice variants, encoding different isoforms, have been characterized. Additional allele specific isoforms, including a secreted form, have been described but have not been fully characterized.

In primates, CR1 serves as the main system for processing and clearance of complement opsonized immune complexes. It has been shown that CR1 can act as a negative regulator of the complement cascade, mediate immune adherence and phagocytosis and inhibit both the classic and alternative pathways. The number of CR1 molecules decreases with aging of erythrocytes in normal individuals and is also decreased in pathological conditions such as systemic lupus erythematosus (SLE), HIV infection, some haemolytic anaemias and other conditions featuring immune complexes. In mice, CR1 is an alternatively spliced variant of the complement receptor 2 (CR2) gene.

Certain alleles of this gene have been statistically associated with an increased risk of developing late-onset Alzheimer's disease.

== Gene region ==
In humans, the CR1 gene is located on the long arm of chromosome 1 at band 32 (1q32) and lies within a complex of immunoregulatory genes. In 5'-3' order the genes in this region are: membrane cofactor protein – CR1 – complement receptor type 2 – decay-accelerating factor – C4-binding protein.

- Membrane cofactor protein is a widely distributed C3b/C4b binding regulatory glycoprotein of the complement system;
- decay-accelerating factor (DAF: CD55: Cromer antigen) protects host cells from complement-mediated damage by regulating the activation of C3 convertases on host cell surfaces;
- complement receptor 2 is the C3d receptor.

Factor H, another immunoregulatory protein, also maps to this location.

== Gene structure and isoforms ==
The canonical Cr2/CD21 gene of subprimate mammals produces two types of complement receptor (CR1, ca. 200 kDa; CR2, ca. 145 kDa) via alternative mRNA splicing. The murine Cr2 gene contains 25 exons; a common first exon is spliced to exon 2 and to exon 9 in transcripts encoding CR1 and CR2, respectively. A transcript with an open reading frame of 4,224 nucleotides encodes the long isoform, CR1; this is predicted to be a protein of 1,408 amino acids that includes 21 short consensus repeats (SCR) of ca. 60 amino acids each, plus transmembrane and cytoplasmic regions. Isoform CR2 (1,032 amino acids) is encoded by a shorter transcript (3,096 coding nucleotides) that lacks exons 2–8 encoding SCR1-6. CR1 and CR2 on murine B cells form complexes with a co-accessory activation complex containing CD19, CD81, and the fragilis/Ifitm (murine equivalents of LEU13) proteins.

The complement receptor 2 (CR2) gene of primates produces only the smaller isoform, CR2; primate CR1, which recapitulates many of the structural domains and presumed functions of Cr2-derived CR1 in subprimates, is encoded by a distinct CR1 gene (apparently derived from the gene Crry of subprimates).

Isoforms CR1 and CR2 derived from the Cr2 gene possess the same C-terminal sequence, such that association with and activation through CD19 should be equivalent. CR1 can bind to C4b and C3b complexes, whereas CR2 (murine and human) binds to C3dg-bound complexes. CR1, a surface protein produced primarily by follicular dendritic cells, appears to be critical for generation of appropriately activated B cells of the germinal centre and for mature antibody responses to bacterial infection.

The most common allelic variant of the human CR1 gene (CR1*1) is composed of 38 exons spanning 133kb encoding a protein of 2,039 amino acids with a predicted molecular weight of 220 kDa. Large insertions and deletions have given rise to four structurally variant genes and some alleles may extend up to 160 kb and 9 additional exons. The transcription start site has been mapped to 111 bp upstream of the translation initiation codon ATG and there is another possible start site 29 bp further upstream. The promoter region lacks a distinct TATA box sequence. The gene is expressed principally on erythrocytes, monocytes, neutrophils and B cells but is also present on some T lymphocytes, mast cells and glomerular podocytes.

== Structure ==
The encoded protein has a 47 amino acid signal peptide, an extracellular domain of 1930 residues, a 25 residue transmembrane domain and a 43 amino acid C terminal cytoplasmic region. The leader sequence and 5'-untranslated region are contained in one exon. The large extracellular domain of CR1, which has 25 potential N-glycosylation sites, can be divided into 30 short consensus repeats (SCRs) (also known as complement control protein repeats (CCPs) or sushi domains), each having 60 to 70 amino acids. The sequence homology between SCRs ranges between 60 and 99 percent. The transmembrane region is encoded by 2 exons and the cytoplasmic domain and the 3'-untranslated regions are coded for by two separate exons.

The 30 or so SCRs are further grouped into four longer regions termed long homologous repeats (LHRs) each encoding approximately 45 kDa of protein and designated LHR-A, -B, -C, and -D. The first three have seven SCRs while LHR-D has 9 or more. Each LHR is composed of 8 exons and within an LHR, SCR 1, 5, and 7 are each encoded by a single exon, SCR 2 and 6 are each encoded by 2 exons, and a single exon codes for SCR 3 and 4. The LHR seem to have arisen as a result of unequal crossing over and the event that gave rise to LHR-B seems to have occurred within the fourth exon of either LHR-A or –C. To date the atomic structure have been solved for SCRs 15–16, 16 & 16–17.

== Alleles ==
Four known human alleles encode proteins with predicted molecular weights of 190 kDa, 220 kDa, 250 kDa and 280 kDa. Multiple size variants (55–220 kDa) are also found among non-human primates and a partial amino-terminal duplication (CR1-like gene) that encodes the short (55–70 kDa) forms expressed on non human erythrocytes. These short CR1 forms, some of which are glycosylphosphatidylinositol (GPI) anchored, are expressed on erythrocytes and the 220-kDa CR1 form is expressed on monocytes. The gene including the repeats is highly conserved in primates possibly because of the ability of the repeats to bind complement. LHR-A binds preferentially to the complement component C4b: LHR-B and LHR-C bind to C3b and also, albeit with a lower affinity, to C4b. Curiously the human CR1 gene appears to have an unusual protein conformation but the significance of this finding is not clear.

The mean number of complement receptor 1 (CR1) molecules on erythrocytes in normal individuals lies within the range of 100–1000 molecules per cell. Two codominant alleles exist – one controlling high and the other low expression. Homozygotes differ by a factor of 10–20: heterozygotes typically have 500–600 copies per erythrocyte. These two alleles appear to have originated before the divergence of the European and African populations.

== Rosetting ==
Plasmodium falciparum erythrocyte membrane protein 1 (PfEMP1) interacts with uninfected erythrocytes. This 'stickiness', known as rosetting, is believed to be a strategy used by the parasite to remain sequestered in the microvasculature to avoid destruction in the spleen and liver. Erythrocyte rosetting causes obstruction of the blood flow in microcapillaries. There is a direct interaction between PfEMP1 and a functional site of complement receptor type 1 on uninfected erythrocytes.

== Role in blood groups ==
The Knops antigen was the 25th blood group system recognized and consists of the single antigen York (Yk) a with the following allelic pairs:

- Knops (Kn) a and b
- McCoy (McC) a and b
- Swain-Langley (Sl) 1 and 2

The antigen is known to lie within the CR1 protein repeats and was first described in 1970 in a 37-year-old Caucasian woman. Racial differences exist in the frequency of these antigens: 98.5% and 96.7% of American Caucasians and Africans respectively are positive for McC(a). 36% of a Mali population were Kn(a) and 14% of exhibited the null (or Helgeson) phenotype compared with only 1% in the American population. The frequencies of McC (b) and Sl (2) are higher in Africans compared with Europeans and while the frequency of McC (b) was similar between Africans from the United States or Mali, the Sl (b) phenotype is significantly more common in Mali – 39% and 65% respectively. In Gambia the Sl (2)/McC(b) phenotype appears to have been positively selected – presumably due to malaria. 80% of Papua New Guineans have the Helgeson phenotype and case–control studies suggest this phenotype has a protective effect against severe malaria.

== Clinical diagnostic ==
Clinical testing in patient care for Knops antigen follows published minimum quality and operational requirements, similar to red cell genotyping for any of the other recognized blood group systems. Molecular analysis can identify gene variants (alleles) that may affect Knops antigen expression on the red cell membrane.
