= CSMD1 =

Protein-coding gene in humans

Identifiers
- Aliases: CSMD1, PPP1R24, CUB and Sushi multiple domains 1
- External IDs: OMIM: 608397; MGI: 2137383; GeneCards: CSMD1
Available structures
PDB	Ortholog search: PDBe RCSB
PDB	List of PDB id codes 2EHF

Gene location (Human)
Chr.	Chromosome 8 (human)
Band	8p23.2	Start	2,935,353 bp
Band	8p23.2	End	4,994,972 bp

Gene location (Mouse)
Chr.	Chromosome 8 (mouse)
Band	8|8 A1.1- A1.3	Start	15,942,537 bp
Band	8|8 A1.1- A1.3	End	17,585,602 bp
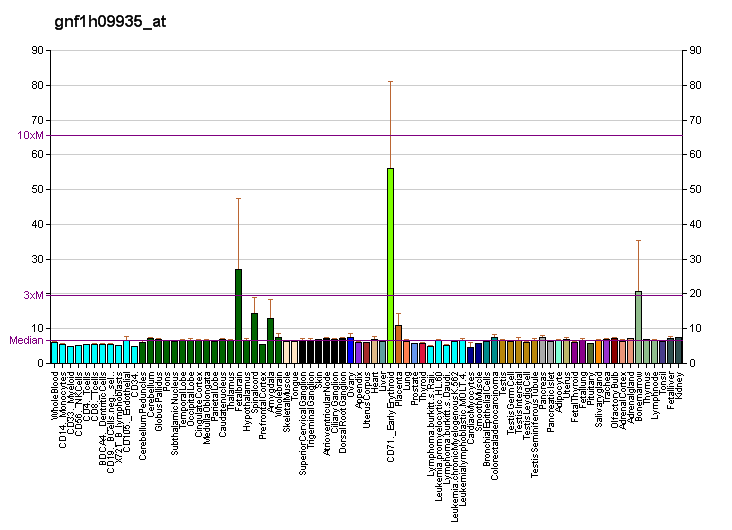

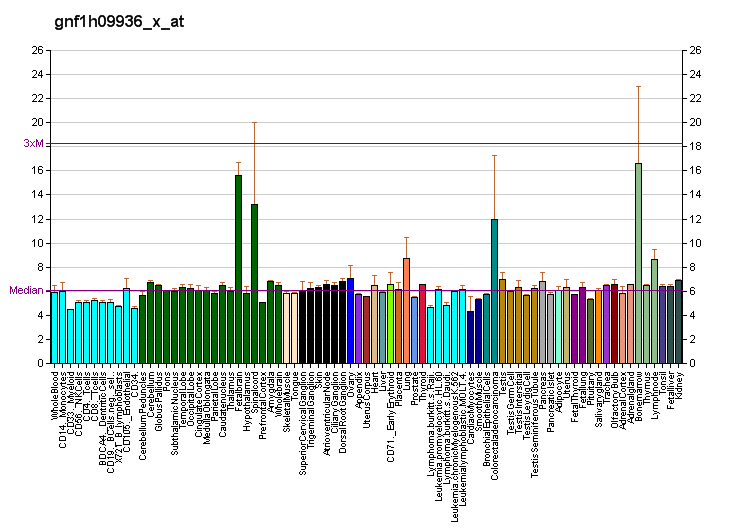
RNA expression pattern
Bgee	Human / Mouse (ortholog); Top expressed in: Brodmann area 23; middle temporal gyrus; primary visual cortex; entorhinal cortex; superior frontal gyrus; postcentral gyrus; Brodmann area 46; endothelial cell; buccal mucosa cell; gonad / Top expressed in: lumbar spinal ganglion; primary visual cortex; superior frontal gyrus; dentate gyrus of hippocampal formation granule cell; amygdala; nucleus accumbens; piriform cortex; ventricular zone; olfactory tubercle; prefrontal cortex; More reference expression data
BioGPS	More reference expression data
Orthologs
Databases	NCBI: entry; OMA: entry
Species	Human	Mouse
Entrez	64478	94109
Ensembl	ENSG00000183117	ENSMUSG00000060924
UniProt	Q96PZ7	Q923L3
RefSeq (mRNA)	NM_033225	NM_053171
RefSeq (protein)	NP_150094	NP_444401
Location (UCSC)	Chr 8: 2.94 – 4.99 Mb	Chr 8: 15.94 – 17.59 Mb
PubMed search
- Wikidata
View/Edit Human	View/Edit Mouse

CSMD1 CUB and Sushi multiple domains 1 is a protein that in humans is encoded by the CSMD1 gene.

== Structure ==
CSMD1 contains 14 N-terminal CUB domains that are separated from each other by a Sushi domains followed by an additional 15 tandem Sushi domain segment.

== Function ==
Based on analogy to other proteins that contain Sushi domains, it is believed that the gene product of CSMD1 functions as a Complement control protein.

== Clinical significance ==
It is a potential tumour suppressor, the deletion of which may result in head and neck carcinomas behaving more aggressively. CSMD1 protein expression was found to be reduced in patients with invasive breast cancer. Functional studies showed that CSMD1 reduction causes cells to transform to a cancer form by increasing their ability to divide, migrate and invade. In a three dimensional model of breast ducts, reduced CSMD1 expression failed breast duct formation.

Certain CSMD1 genetic variants have been found to show an association with risk of developing schizophrenia, consistent with emerging evidence that some forms of schizophrenia may result from dysregulated complement activation in the central nervous system resulting in excessive synaptic pruning.
