= Immune adherence =

Immune adherence was described by Nelson (1953) for an in vitro immunological reaction between normal erythrocytes and a wide variety of microorganisms sensitized with their individually specific antibody and complement; erythrocytes were observed to adhere to microorganisms. It was later recognized to occur in vivo.

The phenomenon is now resolved as a complement-dependent binding reaction of erythrocytes to microorganisms where specific antibodies are engaged in the process. The reaction process is as follows: any microorganisms are bound with their specific antibodies, if they are produced, which activate the classical pathway of the complement system. The cascade begins to work from C1 to C3b through C4b, C3b being further transformed to iC3b (inactive derivative of C3b), all of which, C4b and thereafter, remain to bind to the surface of the microbe. Because primate erythrocytes express complement receptor 1 (CR1) on their surface and having binding specificity to C4b, C3b, or iC3b, erythrocytes accumulate on the microbe via CR1-complement binding.

== Function of the immune adherence (in vivo) ==
Human erythrocytes express 100 to 1,000 CR1 per cell, the average number of approximately 300 being an inherited characteristics. Immune complexes bound to erythrocytes are effectively removed from the circulation, which is presumed alternatively to prevent deposition at tissue sites, for example, the renal glomerulus. Erythrocytes bearing immune complexes traverse sinusoids of the liver and spleen, where they encounter fixed phagocytes. Phagocytes expressing CR1, CR3, and Fcγ receptors effect a transfer of the immune complexes to their surface. Then erythrocytes leave the liver and spleen bearing off immune complexes and work on the next round of transfer of immune complexes after adhering to them.
