= PCOLCE =

Protein-coding gene in humans

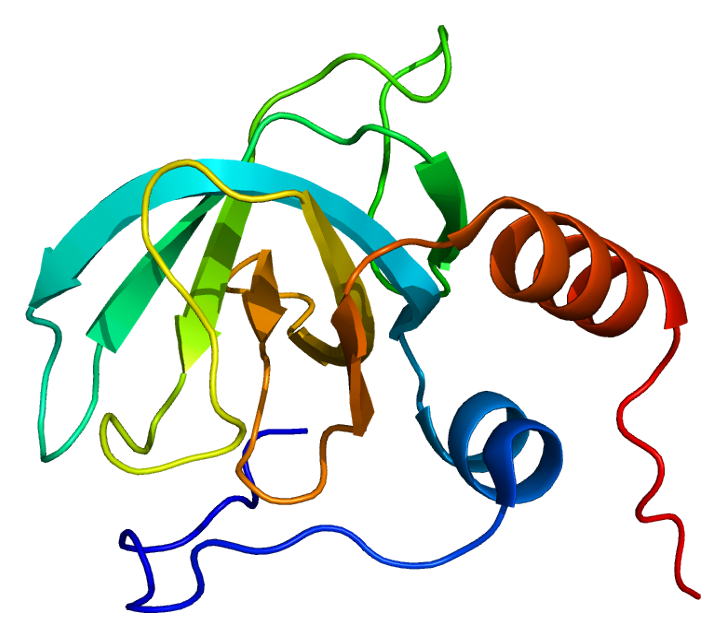
Available structures
PDB	Ortholog search: PDBe RCSB
PDB	List of PDB id codes 1UAP

Identifiers
- Aliases: PCOLCE, PCPE, PCPE-1, PCPE1, procollagen C-endopeptidase enhancer
- External IDs: OMIM: 600270; MGI: 105099; HomoloGene: 1946; GeneCards: PCOLCE; OMA:PCOLCE - orthologs

Gene location (Human)
Chr.	Chromosome 7 (human)
Band	7q22.1	Start	100,602,363 bp
Band	7q22.1	End	100,608,175 bp

Gene location (Mouse)
Chr.	Chromosome 5 (mouse)
Band	5 G2|5 76.59 cM	Start	137,603,365 bp
Band	5 G2|5 76.59 cM	End	137,612,046 bp
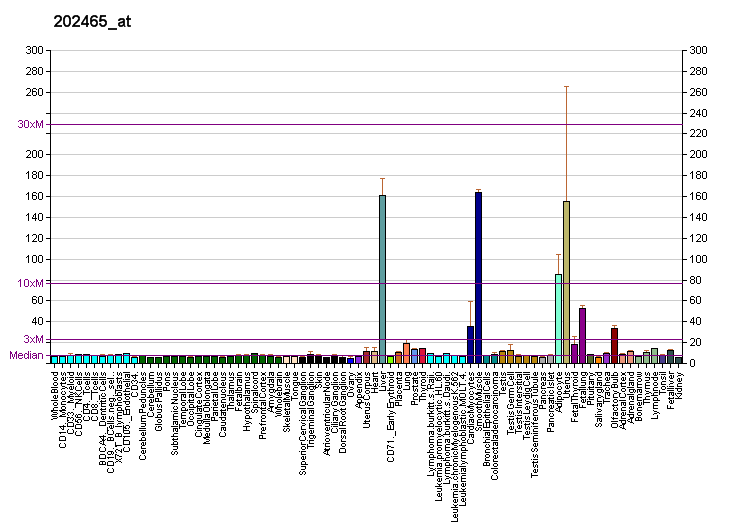
RNA expression pattern
Bgee	Human / Mouse (ortholog); Top expressed in: stromal cell of endometrium; periodontal fiber; canal of the cervix; tendon of biceps brachii; tibia; cartilage tissue; apex of heart; gallbladder; right coronary artery; synovial membrane / Top expressed in: calvaria; fossa; efferent ductule; molar; vas deferens; ankle; umbilical cord; external carotid artery; body of femur; stroma of bone marrow; More reference expression data
BioGPS	More reference expression data
Gene ontology
Molecular function	heparin binding; protein binding; peptidase activator activity; collagen binding; extracellular matrix structural constituent
Cellular component	extracellular matrix; extracellular exosome; extracellular space; extracellular region; collagen-containing extracellular matrix
Biological process	multicellular organism development; proteolysis; positive regulation of peptidase activity; cellular response to leukemia inhibitory factor
Sources:Amigo / QuickGO
Orthologs
Species	Human	Mouse
Entrez	5118	18542
Ensembl	ENSG00000106333	ENSMUSG00000029718
UniProt	Q15113	Q61398
RefSeq (mRNA)	NM_002593	NM_008788
RefSeq (protein)	NP_002584	NP_032814
Location (UCSC)	Chr 7: 100.6 – 100.61 Mb	Chr 5: 137.6 – 137.61 Mb
PubMed search
- Wikidata
View/Edit Human	View/Edit Mouse

Procollagen C-endopeptidase enhancer 1 is an enzyme that in humans is encoded by the PCOLCE gene.

Fibrillar collagen types I-III are synthesized as precursor molecules known as procollagens. These precursors contain amino- and carboxyl-terminal peptide extensions known as N- and C-propeptides, respectively, which are cleaved, upon secretion of procollagen from the cell, to yield the mature triple helical, highly structured fibrils. This gene encodes a glycoprotein which binds and drives the enzymatic cleavage of type I procollagen and heightens activity.
