= CFHR3 =

Protein-coding gene in humans

Identifiers
- Aliases: CFHR3, CFHL3, DOWN16, FHR-3, FHR3, HLF4, complement factor H related 3
- External IDs: OMIM: 605336; GeneCards: CFHR3

Gene location (Human)
Chr.	Chromosome 1 (human)
Band	1q31.3	Start	196,774,813 bp
Band	1q31.3	End	196,795,407 bp
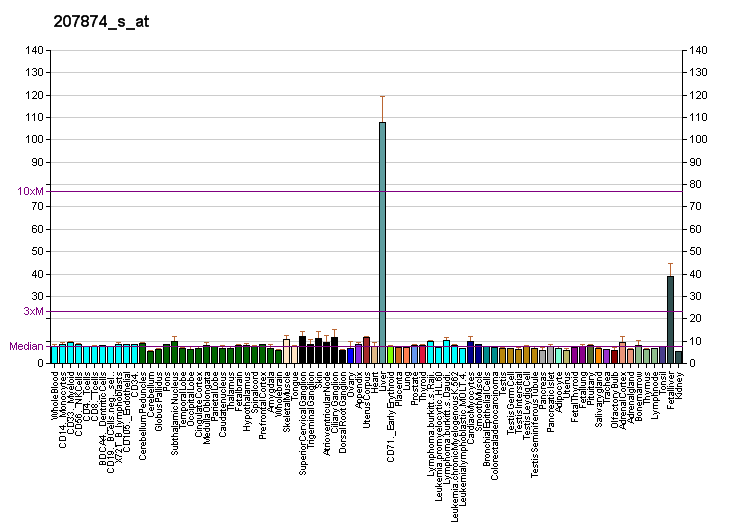
RNA expression pattern
Bgee	Human / Mouse (ortholog); Top expressed in: right lobe of liver; testicle; epithelium of colon; left coronary artery; right coronary artery; popliteal artery; tibial arteries; tibial nerve; Descending thoracic aorta; right auricle of heart / n/a; More reference expression data
BioGPS	More reference expression data
Orthologs
Databases	NCBI: entry; OMA: entry
Species	Human	Mouse
Entrez	10878	n/a
Ensembl	ENSG00000116785	n/a
UniProt	Q02985	n/a
RefSeq (mRNA)	NM_001166624; NM_021023	n/a
RefSeq (protein)	NP_001160096; NP_066303	n/a
Location (UCSC)	Chr 1: 196.77 – 196.8 Mb	n/a
PubMed search		n/a
- Wikidata
View/Edit Human

Complement factor H-related protein 3 is a protein that in humans is encoded by the CFHR3 gene.
