= MFRP =

Protein-coding gene in the species Homo sapiens

Identifiers
- Aliases: MFRP, MCOP5, NNO2, RD6, membrane frizzled-related protein, CTRP5
- External IDs: OMIM: 606227; MGI: 2385957; HomoloGene: 12866; GeneCards: MFRP; OMA:MFRP - orthologs

Gene location (Human)
Chr.	Chromosome 11 (human)
Band	11q23.3	Start	119,338,942 bp
Band	11q23.3	End	119,346,705 bp

Gene location (Mouse)
Chr.	Chromosome 9 (mouse)
Band	9 A5.1|9 24.6 cM	Start	44,013,026 bp
Band	9 A5.1|9 24.6 cM	End	44,020,484 bp
RNA expression pattern
Bgee	Human / Mouse (ortholog); Top expressed in: gonad; apex of heart; Achilles tendon; hippocampus proper; placenta; ventricular zone; muscle of thigh; corpus callosum; substantia nigra; C1 segment / Top expressed in: secondary oocyte; zygote; primary oocyte; hippocampus proper; lens; primary visual cortex; cerebellum; embryo; cerebellar cortex; morula; More reference expression data
BioGPS	n/a
Gene ontology
Molecular function	molecular function
Cellular component	apical plasma membrane; integral component of membrane; plasma membrane; membrane
Biological process	visual perception; eye photoreceptor cell development; retina development in camera-type eye; embryo development ending in birth or egg hatching
Sources:Amigo / QuickGO
Orthologs
Species	Human	Mouse
Entrez	83552	259172
Ensembl	ENSG00000235718	ENSMUSG00000034739
UniProt	Q9BY79	Q8K480
RefSeq (mRNA)	NM_031433	NM_001190314; NM_147126
RefSeq (protein)	NP_113621	NP_001177243; NP_667337
Location (UCSC)	Chr 11: 119.34 – 119.35 Mb	Chr 9: 44.01 – 44.02 Mb
PubMed search
- Wikidata
View/Edit Human	View/Edit Mouse

Membrane frizzled-related protein is a protein that in humans is encoded by the MFRP gene.
