= NETO1 =

Protein-coding gene in the species Homo sapiens

Identifiers
- Aliases: NETO1, BCTL1, BTCL1, neuropilin and tolloid like 1
- External IDs: OMIM: 607973; MGI: 2180216; HomoloGene: 16367; GeneCards: NETO1; OMA:NETO1 - orthologs

Gene location (Human)
Chr.	Chromosome 18 (human)
Band	18q22.3	Start	72,742,314 bp
Band	18q22.3	End	72,868,146 bp

Gene location (Mouse)
Chr.	Chromosome 18 (mouse)
Band	18|18 E4	Start	86,394,952 bp
Band	18|18 E4	End	86,506,718 bp
RNA expression pattern
Bgee	Human / Mouse (ortholog); Top expressed in: prefrontal cortex; Brodmann area 9; cingulate gyrus; anterior cingulate cortex; caudate nucleus; putamen; nucleus accumbens; right frontal lobe; testicle; amygdala / Top expressed in: dorsal striatum; dentate gyrus of hippocampal formation granule cell; nucleus accumbens; subiculum; olfactory tubercle; hippocampus proper; superior frontal gyrus; amygdala; visual cortex; primary visual cortex; More reference expression data
BioGPS	n/a
Gene ontology
Molecular function	ionotropic glutamate receptor binding
Cellular component	integral component of membrane; extracellular region; cell junction; postsynaptic membrane; plasma membrane; synapse; excitatory synapse; membrane; postsynaptic density; postsynaptic density membrane; glutamatergic synapse; integral component of postsynaptic density membrane
Biological process	visual learning; regulation of neuronal synaptic plasticity; receptor localization to synapse; regulation of long-term neuronal synaptic plasticity; memory; positive regulation of excitatory postsynaptic potential; regulation of kainate selective glutamate receptor activity
Sources:Amigo / QuickGO
Orthologs
Species	Human	Mouse
Entrez	81832	246317
Ensembl	ENSG00000166342	ENSMUSG00000050321
UniProt	Q8TDF5	Q8R4I7
RefSeq (mRNA)	NM_001201465; NM_138966; NM_138999; NM_153181; NM_001354017 NM_001354018; NM_001354020; NM_001354021; NM_001354022	NM_144946; NM_001360910
RefSeq (protein)	NP_001188394; NP_620416; NP_620552; NP_001340946; NP_001340947 NP_001340949; NP_001340950; NP_001340951	NP_659195; NP_001347839
Location (UCSC)	Chr 18: 72.74 – 72.87 Mb	Chr 18: 86.39 – 86.51 Mb
PubMed search
- Wikidata
View/Edit Human	View/Edit Mouse

Neuropilin (NRP) and tolloid (TLL)-like 1 is a protein that in humans is encoded by the NETO1 gene.

== Function ==
This gene encodes a predicted transmembrane protein containing two extracellular CUB domains followed by a low-density lipoprotein class A (LDLa) domain. A similar gene in mice encodes a protein that plays a critical role in spatial learning and memory by regulating the function of synaptic N-methyl-D-aspartic acid receptor complexes in the hippocampus. Alternatively spliced transcript variants encoding multiple isoforms have been observed for this gene. [provided by RefSeq, Jan 2011].
