= Bone morphogenetic protein 1 =

Mammalian protein found in Homo sapiens

BMP1
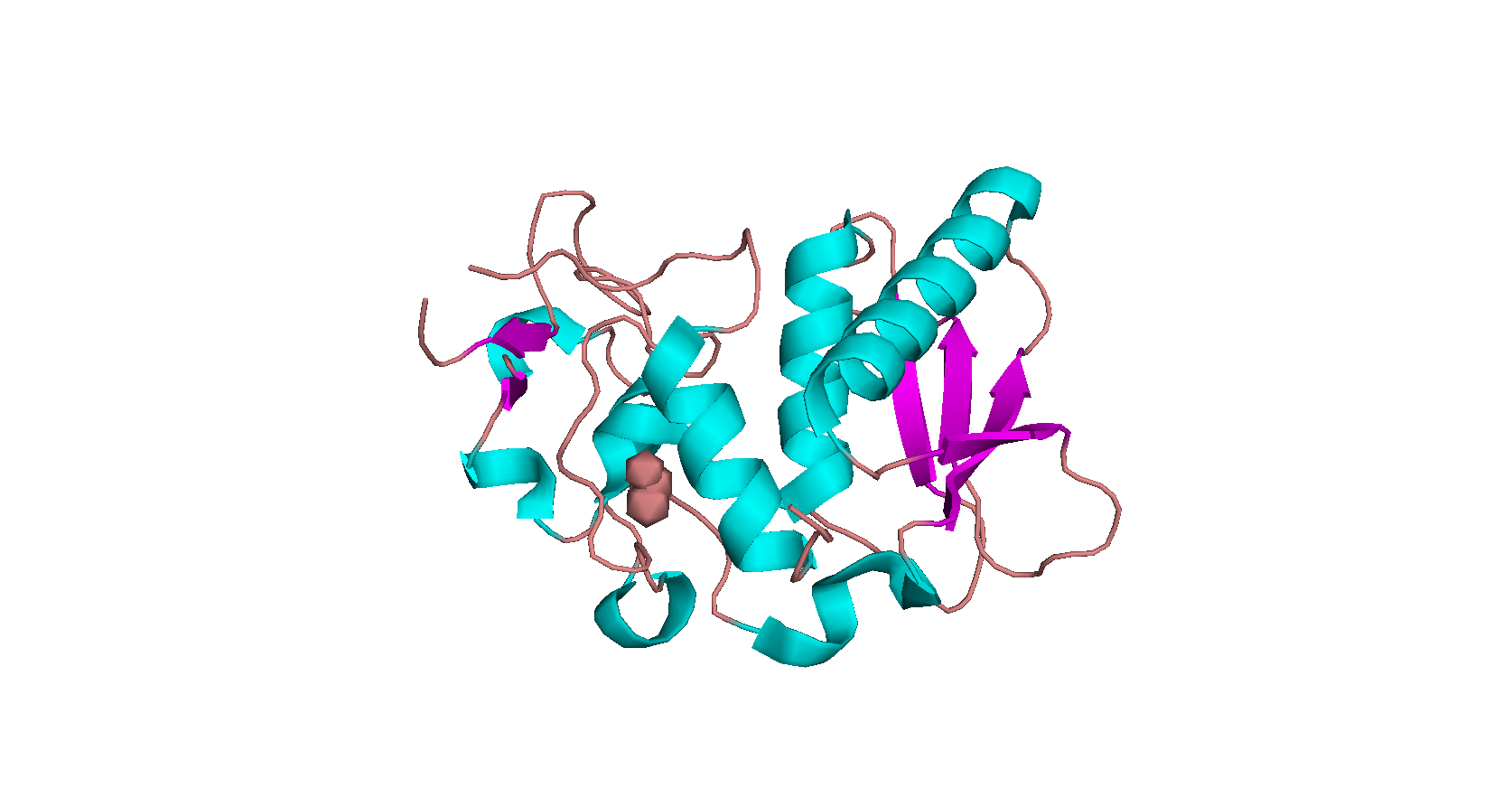

Identifiers
- Aliases: BMP1, bone morphogenetic protein 1, OI13, PCOLC, PCP, PCP2, TLD
- External IDs: OMIM: 112264; MGI: 88176; GeneCards: BMP1
Available structures
PDB	Ortholog search: PDBe RCSB
PDB	List of PDB id codes 3EDG, 3EDH
Enzyme activity
EC #	BRENDA	ExPASy	KEGG	MetaCyc
3.4.24.19	↗	↗	↗	↗

Gene location (Human)
Chr.	Chromosome 8 (human)
Band	8p21.3	Start	22,165,140 bp
Band	8p21.3	End	22,212,326 bp

Gene location (Mouse)
Chr.	Chromosome 14 (mouse)
Band	14 D2|14 36.32 cM	Start	70,474,558 bp
Band	14 D2|14 36.32 cM	End	70,520,234 bp
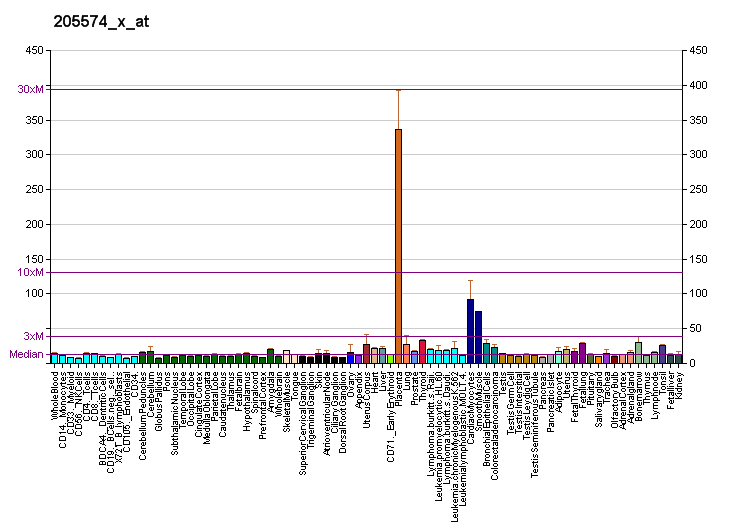

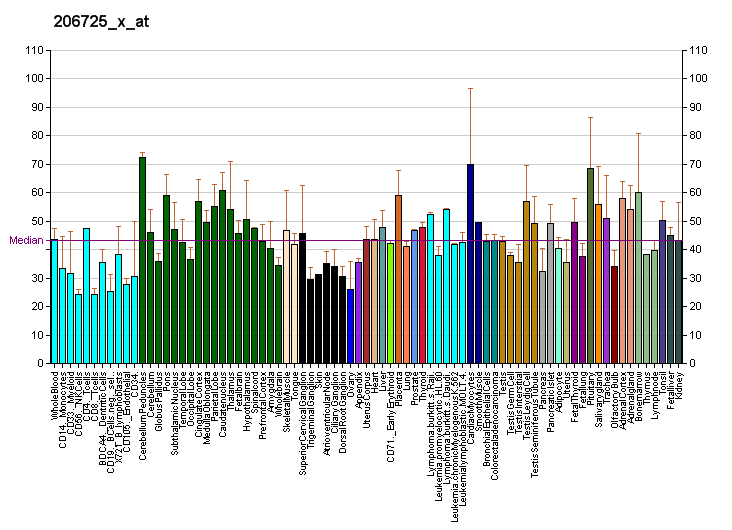

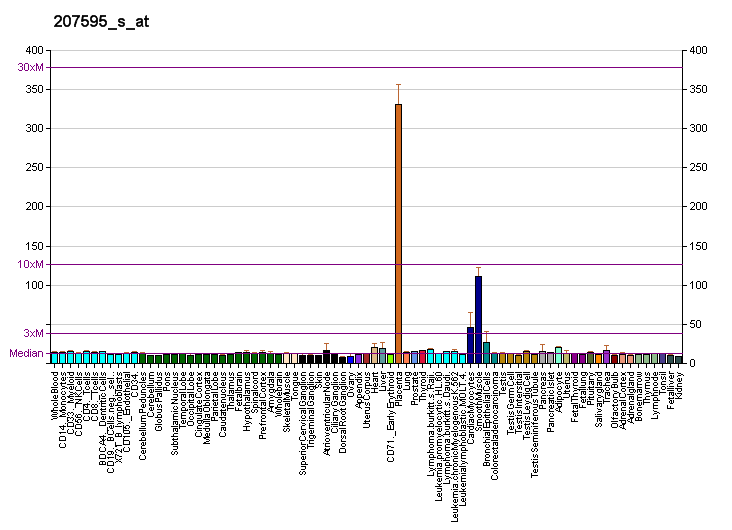
RNA expression pattern
Bgee	Human / Mouse (ortholog); Top expressed in: stromal cell of endometrium; left uterine tube; right adrenal cortex; left coronary artery; canal of the cervix; ectocervix; left adrenal cortex; right coronary artery; body of uterus; gastric mucosa / Top expressed in: gastrula; cerebellar cortex; stroma of bone marrow; lip; decidua; body of femur; external carotid artery; internal carotid artery; calvaria; molar; More reference expression data
BioGPS	More reference expression data
Gene ontology
Molecular function	calcium ion binding; zinc ion binding; metal ion binding; peptidase activity; protein binding; metalloendopeptidase activity; growth factor activity; hydrolase activity; metallopeptidase activity; serine-type endopeptidase activity; cytokine activity; identical protein binding
Cellular component	Golgi apparatus; extracellular region; vesicle; extracellular space
Biological process	skeletal system development; cell differentiation; ossification; extracellular matrix disassembly; proteolysis; multicellular organism development; cartilage development; positive regulation of cartilage development; cartilage condensation; high-density lipoprotein particle assembly; regulation of signaling receptor activity; signal transduction
Sources:Amigo / QuickGO
Orthologs
Databases	NCBI: entry; OMA: entry
Species	Human	Mouse
Entrez	649	12153
Ensembl	ENSG00000168487	ENSMUSG00000022098
UniProt	P13497	P98063
RefSeq (mRNA)	NM_001199; NM_006128; NM_006129; NM_006130; NM_006131 NM_006132	NM_009755; NM_001360021
RefSeq (protein)	NP_001190; NP_006120	NP_033885; NP_001346950
Location (UCSC)	Chr 8: 22.17 – 22.21 Mb	Chr 14: 70.47 – 70.52 Mb
PubMed search
- Wikidata
View/Edit Human	View/Edit Mouse

Bone morphogenetic protein 1, also known as BMP1, is a protein which in humans is encoded by the BMP1 gene. There are seven isoforms of the protein created by alternate splicing.

== Function ==
BMP1 belongs to the peptidase M12A family of bone morphogenetic proteins (BMPs). It induces bone and cartilage development. Unlike other BMPs, it does not belong to the TGFβ superfamily. It was initially discovered to work like other BMPs by inducing bone and cartilage development. It however, is a metalloprotease that cleaves the C-terminus of procollagen I, II and III. It has an astacin-like protease domain.

It has been shown to cleave laminin 5 and is localized in the basal epithelial layer of bovine skin.

The BMP1 locus encodes a protein that is capable of inducing formation of cartilage in vivo. Although other bone morphogenetic proteins are members of the TGF-beta superfamily, BMP1 encodes a protein that is not closely related to other known growth factors. BMP1 protein and procollagen C proteinase (PCP), a secreted metalloprotease requiring calcium and needed for cartilage and bone formation, are identical. PCP or BMP1 protein cleaves the C-terminal propeptides of procollagen I, II, and III and its activity is increased by the procollagen C-endopeptidase enhancer protein. The BMP1 gene is expressed as alternatively spliced variants that share an N-terminal protease domain but differ in their C-terminal region

== Structure ==
A partial structure of BMP1 was determined through X-Ray diffraction with a resolution of 1.27 Å. Crystallization experiments were done by vapor diffusion at a pH of 7.5. This is important because it is close to the pH of the human body, where BMP1 resides in vivo. This BMP1 fragment is 202 residues in length. Its secondary structure is made up of 30% helices, or 10 helices, 61 residues in length, and 15% beta sheets, or 11 strands, 32 residues in length. It contains ligands of an acetyl group and a Zinc ion.

A Ramachandran plot was constructed for BMP1. This plot shows that BMP1 most prefers Phi and Psi angles (Phi, Psi) of around (-60°,-45°) and (-60°, 140°). These preferred angles are an estimate of the most clustered data of the Ramachandran plot. The preferred region is much greater in range. 97% of the residues were in preferred regions and 100% of the residues were in the allowed region, with no outliers.
