= SRPX =

Protein-coding gene in the species Homo sapiens

Identifiers
- Aliases: SRPX, DRS, ETX1, HEL-S-83p, SRPX1, sushi repeat containing protein, X-linked, sushi repeat containing protein X-linked
- External IDs: OMIM: 300187; MGI: 1858306; GeneCards: SRPX

Gene location (Human)
Chr.	X chromosome (human)
Band	Xp11.4	Start	38,149,336 bp
Band	Xp11.4	End	38,220,924 bp

Gene location (Mouse)
Chr.	X chromosome (mouse)
Band	X|X A1.1	Start	9,904,216 bp
Band	X|X A1.1	End	9,983,948 bp
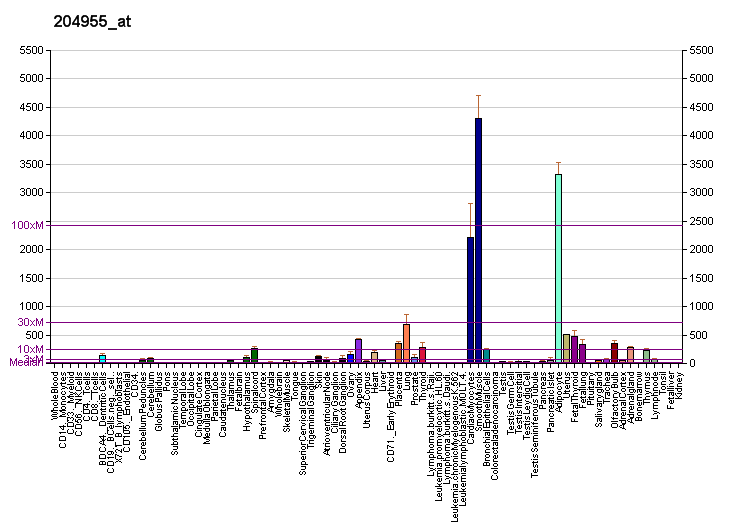
RNA expression pattern
Bgee	Human / Mouse (ortholog); Top expressed in: pericardium; left uterine tube; right ventricle; subcutaneous adipose tissue; decidua; parietal pleura; tibia; lower lobe of lung; superficial temporal artery; vena cava / Top expressed in: calvaria; dermis; molar; lip; umbilical cord; lumbar spinal ganglion; muscle of thigh; lactiferous gland; body of femur; efferent ductule; More reference expression data
BioGPS	More reference expression data
Gene ontology
Molecular function	protein binding; extracellular matrix structural constituent
Cellular component	autophagosome; cell surface; endoplasmic reticulum; membrane; collagen-containing extracellular matrix
Biological process	autophagy; positive regulation of extrinsic apoptotic signaling pathway in absence of ligand; phagolysosome assembly; cell adhesion; negative regulation of cell proliferation involved in contact inhibition; response to endoplasmic reticulum stress
Sources:Amigo / QuickGO
Orthologs
Databases	NCBI: entry; OMA: entry
Species	Human	Mouse
Entrez	8406	51795
Ensembl	ENSG00000101955	ENSMUSG00000090084
UniProt	P78539	Q9R0M3
RefSeq (mRNA)	NM_006307; NM_001170750; NM_001170751; NM_001170752	NM_016911; NM_001365087
RefSeq (protein)	NP_001164221; NP_001164222; NP_001164223; NP_006298	NP_058607; NP_001352016
Location (UCSC)	Chr X: 38.15 – 38.22 Mb	Chr X: 9.9 – 9.98 Mb
PubMed search
- Wikidata
View/Edit Human	View/Edit Mouse

Sushi repeat-containing protein SRPX is a protein that in humans is encoded by the SRPX gene. Bioinformatics analysis suggests the SRPX protein is a peroxiredoxin.
