= TMPRSS7 =

Protein-coding gene in the species Homo sapiens

Identifiers
- Aliases: TMPRSS7, transmembrane protease, serine 7, transmembrane serine protease 7
- External IDs: MGI: 2686594; GeneCards: TMPRSS7

Gene location (Human)
Chr.	Chromosome 3 (human)
Band	3q13.2	Start	112,034,843 bp
Band	3q13.2	End	112,081,269 bp

Gene location (Mouse)
Chr.	Chromosome 16 (mouse)
Band	16|16 B5	Start	45,476,678 bp
Band	16|16 B5	End	45,514,021 bp
RNA expression pattern
Bgee	Human / Mouse (ortholog); Top expressed in: testicle; gonad; olfactory zone of nasal mucosa; right uterine tube; duodenum; left testis; ventricular zone; pituitary gland; anterior pituitary; right testis / Top expressed in: embryo; cerebellar cortex; primary visual cortex; neural layer of retina; ganglionic eminence; Cortex of frontal lobe; superior frontal gyrus; zone of skin; jejunum; ileum; More reference expression data
BioGPS	n/a
Gene ontology
Molecular function	peptidase activity; serine-type peptidase activity; hydrolase activity; serine-type endopeptidase activity
Cellular component	integral component of membrane; plasma membrane; membrane
Biological process	proteolysis
Sources:Amigo / QuickGO
Orthologs
Databases	NCBI: entry; OMA: entry
Species	Human	Mouse
Entrez	344805	208171
Ensembl	ENSG00000176040	ENSMUSG00000033177
UniProt	Q7RTY8	Q8BIK6
RefSeq (mRNA)	NM_001042575; NM_001366279; NM_001395507	NM_172455
RefSeq (protein)	NP_001036040; NP_001353208	NP_766043
Location (UCSC)	Chr 3: 112.03 – 112.08 Mb	Chr 16: 45.48 – 45.51 Mb
PubMed search
- Wikidata
View/Edit Human	View/Edit Mouse

Transmembrane serine protease 7 is a protein that in humans is encoded by the TMPRSS7 gene.
