= Helgeson =

Helgeson is a surname. Notable people with the surname include:

- Donald K. Helgeson (1932–1976), American politician
- Hal Helgeson (1931–2007), American geochemist
- Miner A. Helgeson (1884–1950), American farmer and politician
- Seth Helgeson (born 1990), American ice hockey player
- Ginger Helgeson-Nielsen (born 1968), American former tennis player
