= Neuropilin 2 =

Protein-coding gene in the species Homo sapiens

NRP2
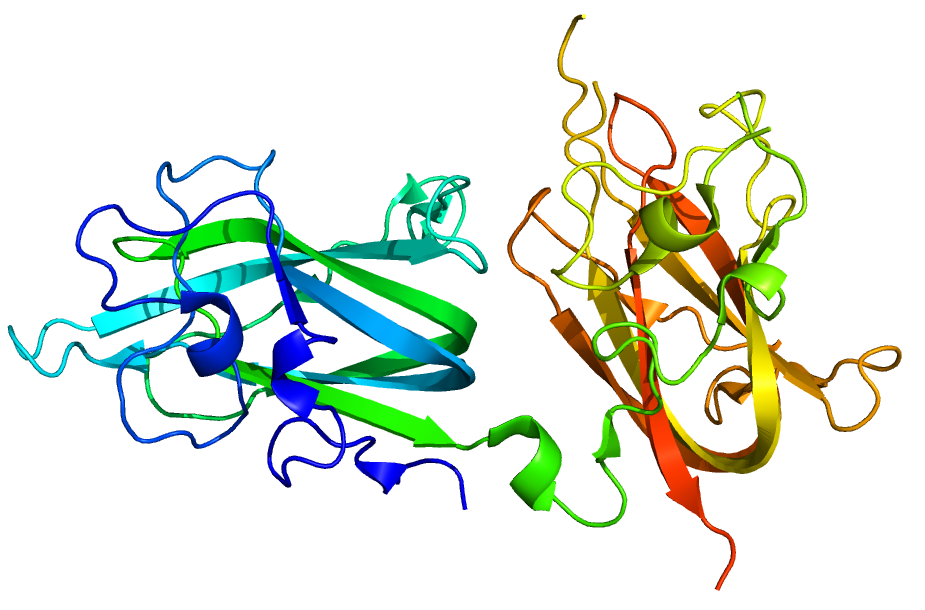

Identifiers
- Aliases: NRP2, NP2, NPN2, PRO2714, VEGF165R2, neuropilin 2
- External IDs: OMIM: 602070; MGI: 1100492; GeneCards: NRP2
Available structures
PDB	Ortholog search: PDBe RCSB
PDB	List of PDB id codes 2QQJ, 2QQK, 2QQL, 2QQO, 4QDQ, 4QDR, 4QDS, 5DN2

Gene location (Human)
Chr.	Chromosome 2 (human)
Band	2q33.3	Start	205,681,990 bp
Band	2q33.3	End	205,798,133 bp

Gene location (Mouse)
Chr.	Chromosome 1 (mouse)
Band	1|1 C2	Start	62,742,444 bp
Band	1|1 C2	End	62,857,854 bp
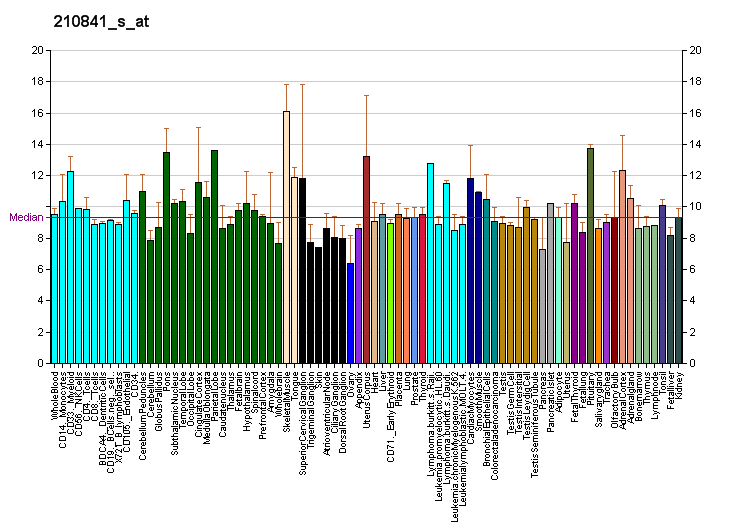

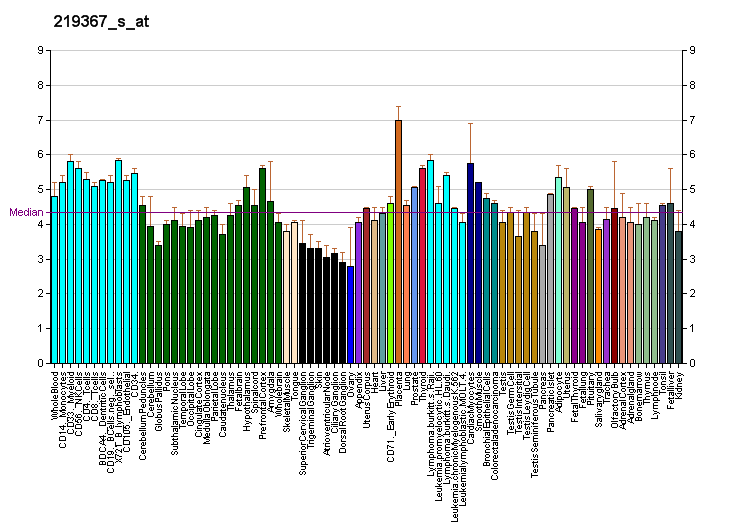
RNA expression pattern
Bgee	Human / Mouse (ortholog); Top expressed in: sural nerve; gastric mucosa; epithelium of colon; muscle layer of sigmoid colon; cartilage tissue; body of uterus; Achilles tendon; smooth muscle tissue; gallbladder; left ovary / Top expressed in: calvaria; body of femur; habenula; epithelium of bronchiole; stroma of bone marrow; dermis; genital tubercle; olfactory tubercle; hair follicle; tail of embryo; More reference expression data
BioGPS	More reference expression data
Gene ontology
Molecular function	vascular endothelial growth factor-activated receptor activity; heparin binding; semaphorin receptor activity; growth factor binding; metal ion binding; cytokine binding; protein binding; identical protein binding; signaling receptor activity
Cellular component	integral component of membrane; membrane; plasma membrane; semaphorin receptor complex; extracellular region; axon; glutamatergic synapse; integral component of postsynaptic membrane
Biological process	sympathetic ganglion development; cell differentiation; semaphorin-plexin signaling pathway involved in neuron projection guidance; positive regulation of endothelial cell proliferation; vascular endothelial growth factor signaling pathway; nervous system development; axon guidance; positive regulation of endothelial cell migration; multicellular organism development; sympathetic neuron projection guidance; vascular endothelial growth factor receptor signaling pathway; cell adhesion; angiogenesis; nerve development; sympathetic neuron projection extension; axon extension involved in axon guidance; outflow tract septum morphogenesis; neural crest cell migration; neuron migration; development of the heart; facial nerve structural organization; vestibulocochlear nerve structural organization; gonadotrophin-releasing hormone neuronal migration to the hypothalamus; ventral trunk neural crest cell migration; negative chemotaxis; trigeminal ganglion development; sensory neuron axon guidance; neural crest cell migration involved in autonomic nervous system development; facioacoustic ganglion development; dorsal root ganglion morphogenesis; cellular response to leukemia inhibitory factor; regulation of postsynapse organization; viral process
Sources:Amigo / QuickGO
Orthologs
Databases	NCBI: entry; OMA: entry
Species	Human	Mouse
Entrez	8828	18187
Ensembl	ENSG00000118257	ENSMUSG00000025969
UniProt	O60462	O35375
RefSeq (mRNA)	NM_003872; NM_018534; NM_201264; NM_201266; NM_201267 NM_201279	NM_001077403; NM_001077404; NM_001077405; NM_001077406; NM_001077407 NM_010939
RefSeq (protein)	NP_003863; NP_061004; NP_957716; NP_957718; NP_957719 NP_958436	NP_001070871; NP_001070872; NP_001070873; NP_001070874; NP_001070875 NP_035069
Location (UCSC)	Chr 2: 205.68 – 205.8 Mb	Chr 1: 62.74 – 62.86 Mb
PubMed search
- Wikidata
View/Edit Human	View/Edit Mouse

Neuropilin 2 (NRP2) is a protein that in humans is encoded by the NRP2 gene.

This gene encodes a member of the neuropilin family of receptor proteins. NRP2 is expressed by a wide variety of cell types. The transmembrane protein has been reported to bind to SEMA3C, SEMA3F, VEGF-A, VEGF-C, VEGF-D, TGFβ, integrins and ANGPTL4 to promote downstream signaling pathways. Consequently, NRP2 is known to play a role in cardiovascular development, axon guidance, tumorigenesis, inflammation and cardiovascular disease. Multiple transcript variants encoding distinct isoforms have been identified for this gene.
