= CFHR1 =

Protein-coding gene in humans

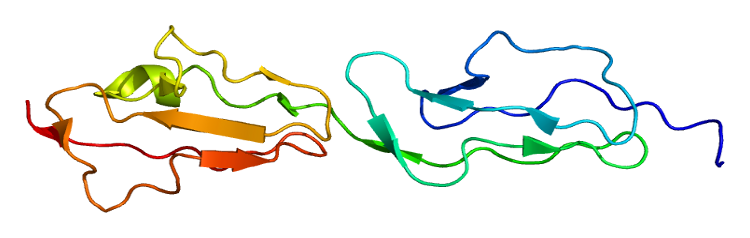

Identifiers
- Aliases: CFHR1, CFHL, CFHL1, CFHL1P, CFHR1P, FHR1, H36-1, H36-2, HFL1, HFL2, complement factor H related 1
- External IDs: OMIM: 134371; MGI: 2138169; GeneCards: CFHR1
Available structures
PDB	Human UniProt search: PDBe RCSB
PDB	List of PDB id codes 3ZD2, 4MUC

Gene location (Human)
Chr.	Chromosome 1 (human)
Band	1q31.3	Start	196,819,757 bp
Band	1q31.3	End	196,832,189 bp

Gene location (Mouse)
Chr.	Chromosome 1 (mouse)
Band	1|1 F	Start	139,474,791 bp
Band	1|1 F	End	139,488,010 bp
RNA expression pattern
Bgee	Human / Mouse (ortholog); Top expressed in: right lobe of liver; testicle; lymph node; gonad; spleen; tibial nerve; human kidney; stromal cell of endometrium; appendix; right hemisphere of cerebellum / Top expressed in: left lobe of liver; gallbladder; cardiac muscle tissue of left ventricle; interventricular septum; extraocular muscle; CA3 field; perirhinal cortex; entorhinal cortex; lactiferous gland; sciatic nerve; More reference expression data
BioGPS	n/a
Gene ontology
Molecular function	protein binding; protein homodimerization activity; protein heterodimerization activity
Cellular component	extracellular exosome; blood microparticle; extracellular space; extracellular region; protein-containing complex
Biological process	complement activation; regulation of complement activation; negative regulation of protein binding; positive regulation of cytolysis
Sources:Amigo / QuickGO
Orthologs
Databases	NCBI: entry; OMA: entry
Species	Human	Mouse
Entrez	3078	50702
Ensembl	ENSG00000244414	ENSMUSG00000057037
UniProt	Q03591	n/a
RefSeq (mRNA)	NM_002113	NM_015780
RefSeq (protein)	NP_002104; NP_001366235; NP_001366236; NP_001366237; NP_001366238 NP_001366239; NP_001366240; NP_001366241	n/a
Location (UCSC)	Chr 1: 196.82 – 196.83 Mb	Chr 1: 139.47 – 139.49 Mb
PubMed search
- Wikidata
View/Edit Human	View/Edit Mouse

Complement factor H-related protein 1 is a protein that in humans is encoded by the CFHR1 gene.
