= PCOLCE2 =

Protein-coding gene in humans

Identifiers
- Aliases: PCOLCE2, PCPE2, procollagen C-endopeptidase enhancer 2
- External IDs: OMIM: 607064; MGI: 1923727; HomoloGene: 8357; GeneCards: PCOLCE2; OMA:PCOLCE2 - orthologs

Gene location (Human)
Chr.	Chromosome 3 (human)
Band	3q23	Start	142,815,922 bp
Band	3q23	End	142,889,206 bp

Gene location (Mouse)
Chr.	Chromosome 9 (mouse)
Band	9|9 E3.3	Start	95,519,654 bp
Band	9|9 E3.3	End	95,580,149 bp
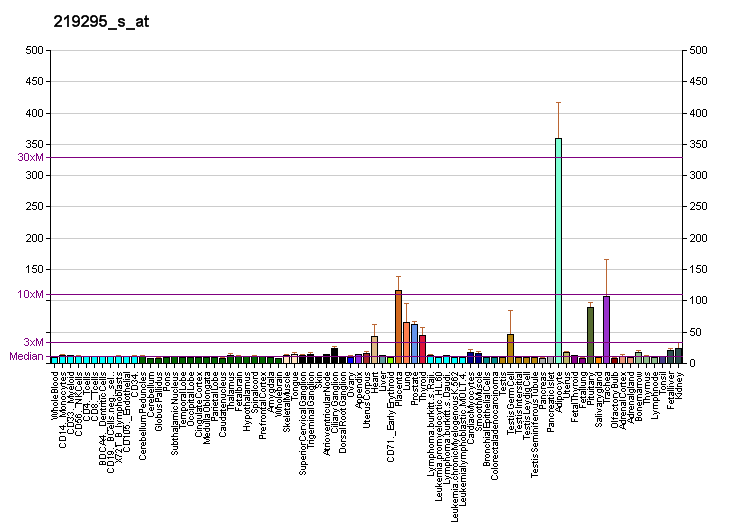
RNA expression pattern
Bgee	Human / Mouse (ortholog); Top expressed in: Achilles tendon; tibia; synovial joint; tendon of biceps brachii; glomerulus; right coronary artery; metanephric glomerulus; pericardium; right auricle of heart; Descending thoracic aorta / Top expressed in: Epithelium of choroid plexus; right lung lobe; ascending aorta; skin of external ear; aortic valve; nasal epithelium; olfactory epithelium; carotid body; sciatic nerve; ankle; More reference expression data
BioGPS	More reference expression data
Gene ontology
Molecular function	heparin binding; peptidase activator activity; collagen binding
Cellular component	extracellular region
Biological process	positive regulation of peptidase activity; cellular response to leukemia inhibitory factor
Sources:Amigo / QuickGO
Orthologs
Species	Human	Mouse
Entrez	26577	76477
Ensembl	ENSG00000163710	ENSMUSG00000015354
UniProt	Q9UKZ9	Q8R4W6
RefSeq (mRNA)	NM_013363	NM_029620
RefSeq (protein)	NP_037495	NP_083896
Location (UCSC)	Chr 3: 142.82 – 142.89 Mb	Chr 9: 95.52 – 95.58 Mb
PubMed search
- Wikidata
View/Edit Human	View/Edit Mouse

Procollagen C-endopeptidase enhancer 2 is a protein that in humans is encoded by the PCOLCE2 gene.
