= DCBLD2 =

Protein-coding gene in the species Homo sapiens

Identifiers
- Aliases: DCBLD2, CLCP1, ESDN, discoidin, CUB and LCCL domain containing 2
- External IDs: OMIM: 608698; MGI: 1920629; GeneCards: DCBLD2

Gene location (Human)
Chr.	Chromosome 3 (human)
Band	3q12.1|3	Start	98,795,941 bp
Band	3q12.1|3	End	98,901,695 bp

Gene location (Mouse)
Chr.	Chromosome 16 (mouse)
Band	16|16 C1.2	Start	58,408,443 bp
Band	16|16 C1.2	End	58,469,727 bp
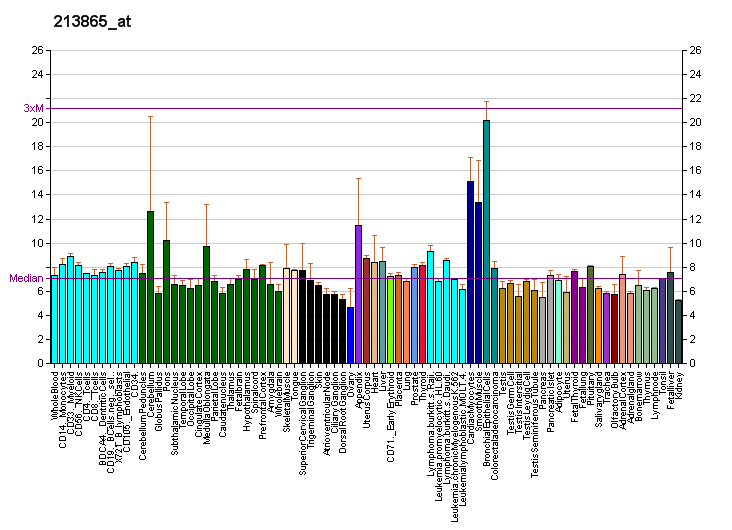
RNA expression pattern
Bgee	Human / Mouse (ortholog); Top expressed in: stromal cell of endometrium; vena cava; parotid gland; body of tongue; synovial joint; Skeletal muscle tissue of rectus abdominis; cardia; pons; mucosa of paranasal sinus; pylorus / Top expressed in: decidua; atrium; pineal gland; secondary oocyte; epithelium of stomach; primary oocyte; umbilical cord; external carotid artery; tail of embryo; endothelial cell of lymphatic vessel; More reference expression data
BioGPS	More reference expression data
Gene ontology
Molecular function	protein binding
Cellular component	integral component of membrane; cell surface; integral component of plasma membrane; membrane
Biological process	intracellular receptor signaling pathway; wound healing; negative regulation of cell growth
Sources:Amigo / QuickGO
Orthologs
Databases	NCBI: entry; OMA: entry
Species	Human	Mouse
Entrez	131566	73379
Ensembl	ENSG00000057019	ENSMUSG00000035107
UniProt	Q96PD2	Q91ZV3
RefSeq (mRNA)	NM_080927	NM_028523; NM_001356484
RefSeq (protein)	NP_563615	NP_082799; NP_001343413
Location (UCSC)	Chr 3: 98.8 – 98.9 Mb	Chr 16: 58.41 – 58.47 Mb
PubMed search
- Wikidata
View/Edit Human	View/Edit Mouse

Discoidin, CUB and LCCL domain-containing protein 2 is a protein that in humans is encoded by the DCBLD2 gene.
