= Complement regulatory proteins =

Complement regulatory proteins are proteins that interact with various components of the complement system. The complement system is tightly regulated by a network of proteins known as "regulators of complement activation (RCA)" that help distinguish target cells as "self" or "non-self." A subset of this family of proteins, complement regulatory proteins, are characterized by domains of conserved repeats that direct interaction with components of the complement system. These "Sushi" domains have been used to identify other putative members of the complement regulatory protein family. There are many other RCA proteins that do not fall into this family.

Most complement regulatory proteins prevent activation of the complement system on the surface of host cells and protect host tissues against damage caused by autoimmunity. Because of this, these proteins play important roles in autoimmune disorders and cancers.

== Members ==
Most of the well-studied proteins within this family can be categorized in two classes:

Membrane-bound complement regulators

- Membrane Cofactor Protein, MCP (CD46)
- Decay Accelerating Factor, DAF (CD55)
- Protectin (CD59)
- Complement C3b/C4b Receptor 1, CR1 (CD35)
- Complement Regulator of the Immunoglobulin Superfamily, CRIg

Soluble complement regulators

- Factor H
- C4-Binding Protein (C4bp)

Other proteins with characteristic complement regulatory protein domains have been identified including members of the sushi domain containing (SUSD) protein family and Human CUB and sushi multiple domains family (CSMD).

== Mechanisms of protection ==
Every cell in the human body is protected by one or more of the membrane-associated RCA proteins, CR1, DAF or MCP. Factor H and C4BP circulate in the plasma and are recruited to self-surfaces through binding to host-specific polysaccharides such as the glycosaminoglycans.

Most complement regulatory proteins function by preventing convertase activity. Convertases, specifically the C3 convertases C3b.Bb and C4b.2a, are the enzymes that drive complement activation by activating C3b, a central component of the complement system. Some complement regulatory proteins, such as CD46, recruit other RCAs to proteolytically inactivate developing convertases. CD55 and other complement regulatory proteins promote the rapid dissociation of active enzymes. Other complement regulatory proteins prevent the activity of terminal effectors of the complement system, CD59 for example blocks oligomerization of the complement peptide C9 stalling the formation of the Membrane Attack Complex (MAC).

For example, C3b.Bb is an important convertase that is part of the alternative pathway, and it is formed when factor B binds C3b and is subsequently cleaved. To prevent this from happening, factor H competes with factor B to bind C3b; if it manages to bind, then the convertase is not formed. Factor H can bind C3b much more easily in the presence of sialic acid, which is a component of most cells in the human body; conversely, in the absence of sialic acid, factor B can bind C3b more easily. This means that if C3b is bound to a "self" cell, the presence of sialic acid and the binding of factor H will prevent the complement cascade from activating; if C3b is bound to a bacterium, factor B will bind and the cascade will be set off as normal. This mechanism of immune regulation using Factor H has been exploited by several bacterial pathogens.

== Structure ==
RCA proteins typically possess complement regulatory protein domains, also termed Sushi domains or Short Consensus Repeats (SCR). Such beta-sandwich domains contain about 60 amino acid residues, each with 4 conserved cysteines arranged in two conserved disulfide bonds (oxidized in 'abab' manner), and a conserved tryptophan, but otherwise can vary greatly in sequence. Recently, it has been demonstrated that the order, spatial relationship, and structure of these domains is essential for determining function.

The first complement regulatory protein domain structure determined was a solution structure of the 16th module of factor H (pdb:1hcc). Since then, other complement regulatory protein domains have been solved either by NMR-spectroscopy (also relaxation studies, e.g. module 2 and 3 from CD55 (pdb:1nwv)) or by X-ray diffraction (also with co-crystallized partner, e.g. CR2 complement regulatory protein modules complexed with C3d (pdb:1ghq)).

== Clinical significance ==
Complement has been implicated in many diseases associated with inflammation and autoimmunity. Efforts to develop therapeutics that target the interactions between the RCA network, complement regulatory proteins, and components of the complement system have led to the development of successful drugs including Eculizumab.

There are two primary mechanisms by which dysfunction of complement can contribute to tissue damage:

1. Decreased protection of host tissues from complement activation due to the absence or lack of function of complement regulatory proteins
2. Exhaustion of CRAs due to exposure of host cells that activate complement (either through direct damage or dysfunction) or prolonged attack by a potential pathogen such as during sepsis

The importance of complement regulation for good health is highlighted by recent work that seems to imply that individuals carrying point mutations or single nucleotide polymorphisms in their genes for factor H may be more susceptible to diseases including atypical hemolytic uremic syndrome, dense deposit diseases (or membranoproliferative glomerulonephritis type 2) and - most notably because of its prevalence in the elderly - age-related macular degeneration. Transgenic pigs that express human complement regulation factors were some of the first transgenic pigs used for xenotransplantation.

Complement regulatory proteins also play a role in malignancy. Complement proteins protect against malignant cells- both by direct complement attack and through initiation of Complement-dependent cytotoxicity, which synergises with specific monoclonal antibody therapies. However, some malignant cells have been shown to have increased expression of membrane-bound complement control proteins, especially CD46, DAF and CD59. This mechanism allows some tumours to evade complement action.

Complement regulatory proteins have been exploited extensively by pathogenic microbes. Neisseria gonorhoeae and Neisseria meningitidis, the bacteria responsible for gonorrhea and meningitis have many well-studied evasion strategies involving complement regulatory proteins, including binding soluble regulators like Factor H and C4bp. Many viruses, such as Vaccinia incorporate mimics of complement regulatory proteins into their envelope for the purposes of evading the complement system. Still other microbes such as the measles virus use complement regulatory proteins as receptors to gain entry to cells during infection. Each of these strategies may provide targets for the development of vaccines, as with the case of N. meningitidis.

Certain forms of schizophrenia are characterised by an underlying biological mechanism of excessive synaptic pruning, mediated by a dysregulated complement system in the brain. Accordingly, genetic variants of a brain-specific complement inhibitor, CSMD1, are associated with the risk of developing schizophrenia.
