= CFHR2 =

Protein-coding gene in humans

Identifiers
- Aliases: CFHR2, CFHL2, FHR2, HFL3, complement factor H related 2
- External IDs: OMIM: 600889; GeneCards: CFHR2
Available structures
| PDB | Human UniProt search: PDBe RCSB |
| PDB | List of PDB id codes 3ZD1, 5EA0 |

Gene location (Human)
| Chr. | Chromosome 1 (human) |
| Band | 1q31.3 | Start | 196,943,738 bp |
| Band | 1q31.3 | End | 196,959,622 bp |
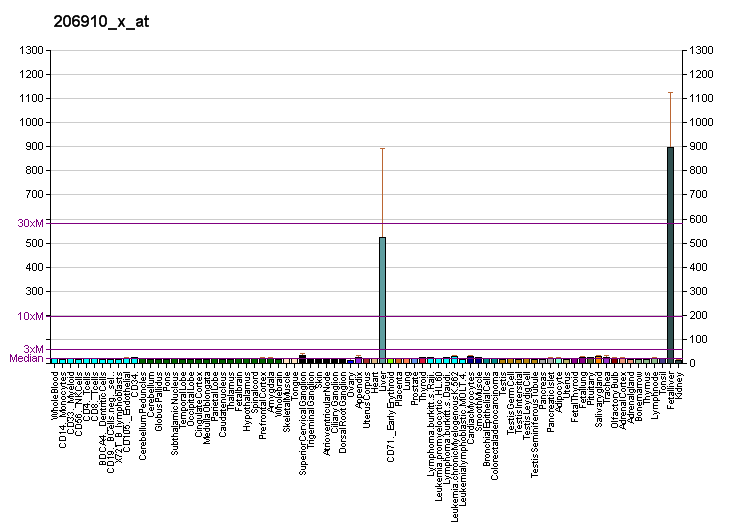
RNA expression pattern
| Bgee | Human / Mouse (ortholog); Top expressed in: right lobe of liver; parietal pleura; mucosa of paranasal sinus; palpebral conjunctiva; skin of arm; buccal mucosa cell; gonad; testicle; visceral pleura; germinal epithelium / n/a; More reference expression data |
| BioGPS | More reference expression data |
Gene ontology
| Molecular function | protein binding; protein homodimerization activity; protein heterodimerization activity |
| Cellular component | extracellular region; protein-containing complex |
| Biological process | regulation of complement activation; negative regulation of protein binding; positive regulation of cytolysis |
Sources:Amigo / QuickGO
Orthologs
| Databases | NCBI: entry; OMA: entry |
| Species | Human | Mouse |
| Entrez | 3080 | n/a |
| Ensembl | ENSG00000080910 | n/a |
| UniProt | P36980 | n/a |
| RefSeq (mRNA) | NM_001312672; NM_005666 | n/a |
| RefSeq (protein) | NP_001299601; NP_005657 | n/a |
| Location (UCSC) | Chr 1: 196.94 – 196.96 Mb | n/a |
| PubMed search | | n/a |
- Wikidata
| View/Edit Human |

Complement factor H-related protein 2 is a protein that in humans is encoded by the CFHR2 gene.
