= TLL1 =

Protein-coding gene in the species Homo sapiens

Identifiers
- Aliases: TLL1, ASD6, TLL, tolloid like 1
- External IDs: OMIM: 606742; MGI: 106923; GeneCards: TLL1
Available structures
PDB	Ortholog search: PDBe RCSB
PDB	List of PDB id codes 3EDI

Gene location (Human)
Chr.	Chromosome 4 (human)
Band	4q32.3	Start	165,873,237 bp
Band	4q32.3	End	166,104,457 bp

Gene location (Mouse)
Chr.	Chromosome 8 (mouse)
Band	8 B3.1|8 32.19 cM	Start	64,467,965 bp
Band	8 B3.1|8 32.19 cM	End	64,659,305 bp
RNA expression pattern
Bgee	Human / Mouse (ortholog); Top expressed in: secondary oocyte; gonad; testicle; cerebellar cortex; cerebellar hemisphere; epithelium of colon; right hemisphere of cerebellum; Achilles tendon; gallbladder; smooth muscle tissue / Top expressed in: muscular part of interventricular septum; cardiac muscle tissue of interventricular septum; aorticopulmonary septum; vein; endocardium of atrium; interatrial septum; septum primum; endocardium of right atrium; zygote; secondary oocyte; More reference expression data
BioGPS	n/a
Gene ontology
Molecular function	calcium ion binding; zinc ion binding; peptidase activity; hydrolase activity; metallopeptidase activity; metal ion binding; metalloendopeptidase activity; serine-type endopeptidase activity
Cellular component	extracellular region
Biological process	multicellular organism development; skeletal system development; cell differentiation; extracellular matrix disassembly; proteolysis
Sources:Amigo / QuickGO
Orthologs
Databases	NCBI: entry; OMA: entry
Species	Human	Mouse
Entrez	7092	21892
Ensembl	ENSG00000038295	ENSMUSG00000053626
UniProt	O43897	Q62381
RefSeq (mRNA)	NM_001204760; NM_012464	NM_009390
RefSeq (protein)	NP_001191689; NP_036596	NP_033416
Location (UCSC)	Chr 4: 165.87 – 166.1 Mb	Chr 8: 64.47 – 64.66 Mb
PubMed search
- Wikidata
View/Edit Human	View/Edit Mouse

Tolloid-like protein 1 is a protein that in humans is encoded by the TLL1 gene.

This gene encodes an astacin-like zinc-dependent metalloprotease and is a subfamily member of the metzincin family. A similar protein in mice is required during heart development and specifically processes procollagen C-propeptides and chordin at similar cleavage sites.

In clinical context, TLL1 was mostly associated with atrial septal defect in an autosomal dominant mode of inheritance of loss-of-function mutations. However, functional studies have also linked its gain-of-function with mitral valve prolapse.
