= TLL2 =

Protein-coding gene in the species Homo sapiens

Identifiers
- Aliases: TLL2, tolloid like 2
- External IDs: OMIM: 606743; MGI: 1346044; GeneCards: TLL2

Gene location (Human)
Chr.	Chromosome 10 (human)
Band	10q24.1	Start	96,364,608 bp
Band	10q24.1	End	96,513,926 bp

Gene location (Mouse)
Chr.	Chromosome 19 (mouse)
Band	19|19 C3	Start	41,071,192 bp
Band	19|19 C3	End	41,195,274 bp
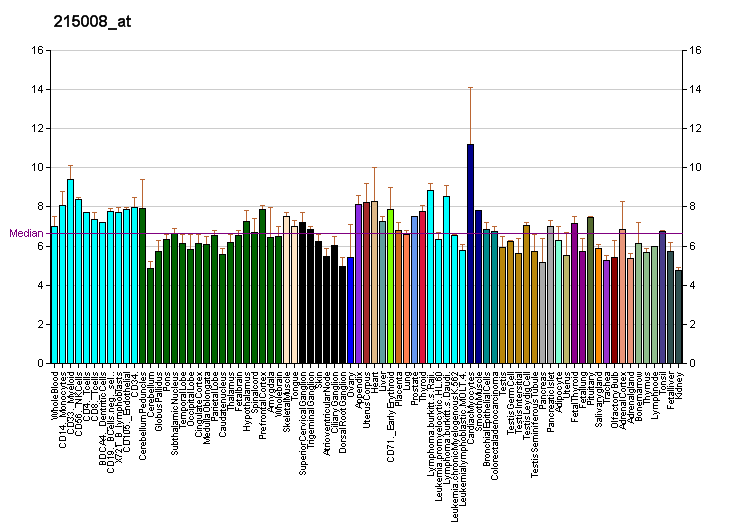

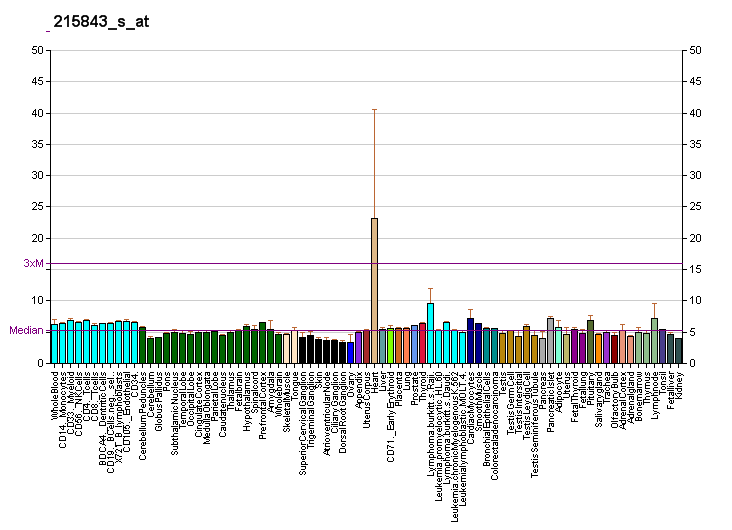

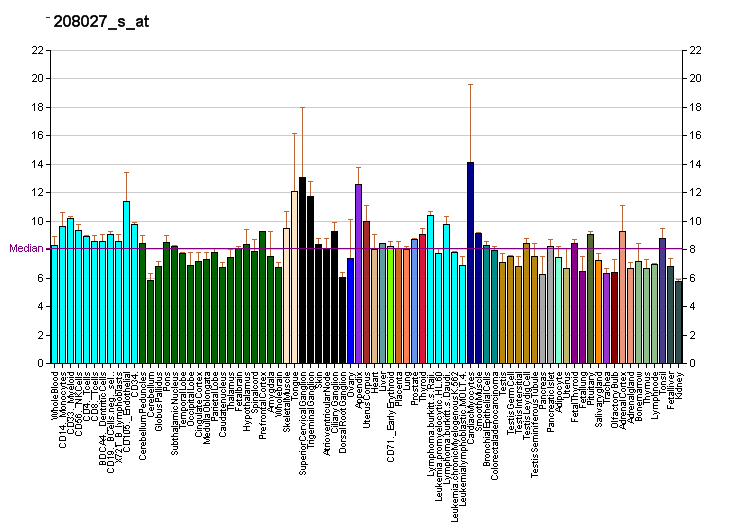
RNA expression pattern
Bgee	Human / Mouse (ortholog); Top expressed in: buccal mucosa cell; gonad; apex of heart; testicle; left ventricle; Brodmann area 23; right ventricle; C1 segment; middle temporal gyrus; muscle of thigh / Top expressed in: embryo; tail of embryo; esophagus; stria vascularis; mesencephalon; ovary; More reference expression data
BioGPS	More reference expression data
Gene ontology
Molecular function	calcium ion binding; zinc ion binding; peptidase activity; metalloendopeptidase activity; hydrolase activity; metallopeptidase activity; metal ion binding; serine-type endopeptidase activity
Cellular component	extracellular region
Biological process	multicellular organism development; cell differentiation; extracellular matrix disassembly; negative regulation of skeletal muscle tissue growth; proteolysis
Sources:Amigo / QuickGO
Orthologs
Databases	NCBI: entry; OMA: entry
Species	Human	Mouse
Entrez	7093	24087
Ensembl	ENSG00000095587	ENSMUSG00000025013
UniProt	Q9Y6L7	Q9WVM6
RefSeq (mRNA)	NM_012465	NM_011904
RefSeq (protein)	NP_036597	NP_036034
Location (UCSC)	Chr 10: 96.36 – 96.51 Mb	Chr 19: 41.07 – 41.2 Mb
PubMed search
- Wikidata
View/Edit Human	View/Edit Mouse

Tolloid-like protein 2 is a protein that in humans is encoded by the TLL2 gene.

This gene encodes an astacin-like zinc-dependent metalloprotease and is a subfamily member of the metzincin family. Unlike other family members, a similar protein in mice does not cleave procollagen C-propeptides or chordin.
