= SEZ6L =

Protein-coding gene in the species Homo sapiens

Identifiers
- Aliases: SEZ6L, seizure related 6 homolog like
- External IDs: OMIM: 607021; MGI: 1935121; GeneCards: SEZ6L
Available structures
PDB	Ortholog search: PDBe RCSB
PDB	List of PDB id codes 2YRA

Gene location (Human)
Chr.	Chromosome 22 (human)
Band	22q12.1	Start	26,169,462 bp
Band	22q12.1	End	26,383,597 bp

Gene location (Mouse)
Chr.	Chromosome 5 (mouse)
Band	5|5 F	Start	112,567,017 bp
Band	5|5 F	End	112,725,051 bp
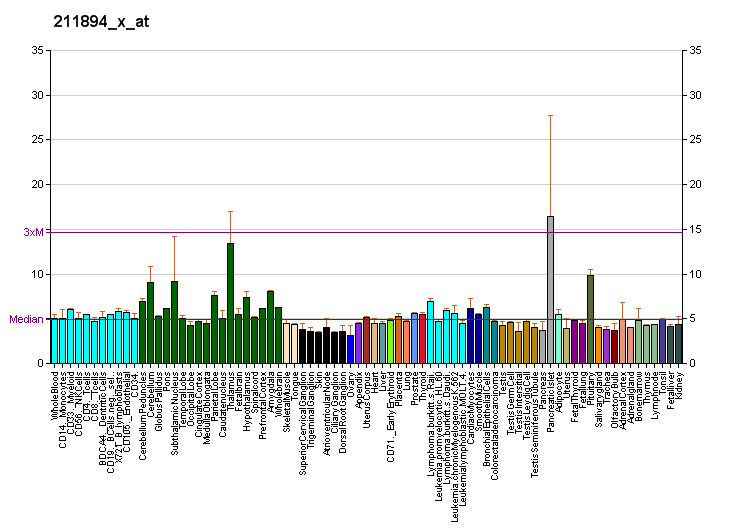

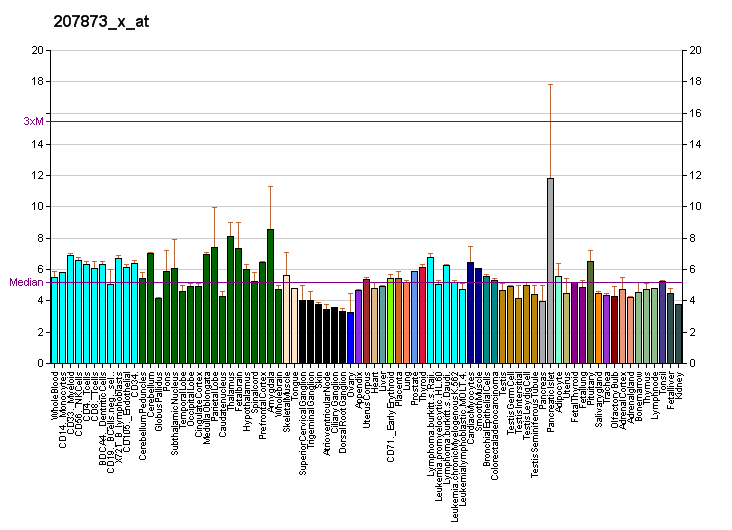

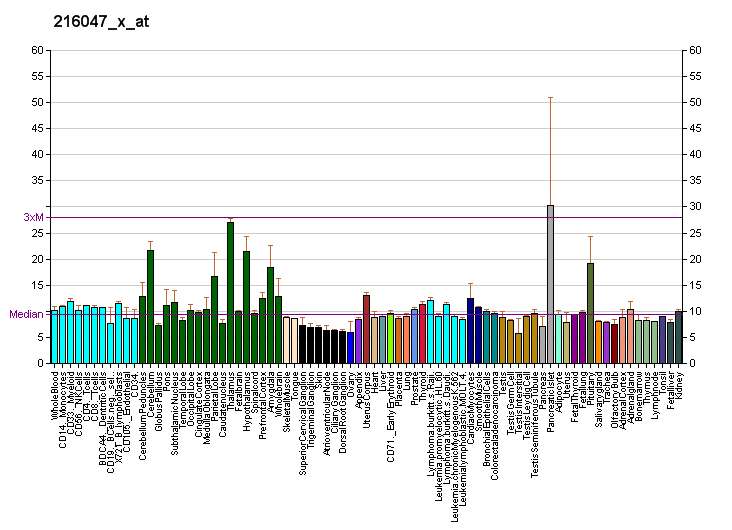
RNA expression pattern
Bgee	Human / Mouse (ortholog); Top expressed in: ganglionic eminence; endothelial cell; lateral nuclear group of thalamus; ventricular zone; prefrontal cortex; buccal mucosa cell; dorsolateral prefrontal cortex; Region I of hippocampus proper; cingulate gyrus; anterior cingulate cortex / Top expressed in: dentate gyrus of hippocampal formation granule cell; CA3 field; entorhinal cortex; primary visual cortex; perirhinal cortex; superior frontal gyrus; nucleus of stria terminalis; cerebellar cortex; hippocampus proper; lateral septal nucleus; More reference expression data
BioGPS	More reference expression data
Orthologs
Databases	NCBI: entry; OMA: entry
Species	Human	Mouse
Entrez	23544	56747
Ensembl	ENSG00000100095	ENSMUSG00000058153
UniProt	Q9BYH1	Q6P1D5
RefSeq (mRNA)	NM_001184773; NM_001184774; NM_001184775; NM_001184776; NM_001184777 NM_021115	NM_001253916; NM_001253917; NM_019982
RefSeq (protein)	NP_001171702; NP_001171703; NP_001171704; NP_001171705; NP_001171706 NP_066938; NP_001171704.1	NP_001240845; NP_001240846; NP_064366; NP_001390215; NP_001390216 NP_001390217; NP_001390218
Location (UCSC)	Chr 22: 26.17 – 26.38 Mb	Chr 5: 112.57 – 112.73 Mb
PubMed search
- Wikidata
View/Edit Human	View/Edit Mouse

Seizure 6-like protein is a protein that in humans is encoded by the SEZ6L gene.
