= CSMD2 =

Protein-coding gene in humans

Identifiers
- Aliases: CSMD2, dJ1007G16.1, dJ1007G16.2, dJ947L8.1, CUB and Sushi multiple domains 2
- External IDs: OMIM: 608398; MGI: 2386401; GeneCards: CSMD2

Gene location (Human)
Chr.	Chromosome 1 (human)
Band	1p35.1	Start	33,513,998 bp
Band	1p35.1	End	34,165,842 bp

Gene location (Mouse)
Chr.	Chromosome 4 (mouse)
Band	4|4 D2.2	Start	127,881,650 bp
Band	4|4 D2.2	End	128,461,449 bp
RNA expression pattern
Bgee	Human / Mouse (ortholog); Top expressed in: buccal mucosa cell; ventricular zone; primary visual cortex; ganglionic eminence; Brodmann area 23; gonad; middle temporal gyrus; testicle; corpus callosum; sural nerve / Top expressed in: superior frontal gyrus; primary visual cortex; ventricular zone; facial motor nucleus; Rostral migratory stream; dentate gyrus of hippocampal formation granule cell; substantia nigra; prefrontal cortex; cervical ganglion; lens; More reference expression data
BioGPS	n/a
Orthologs
Databases	NCBI: entry; OMA: entry
Species	Human	Mouse
Entrez	114784	329942
Ensembl	ENSG00000121904	ENSMUSG00000028804
UniProt	Q7Z408	V9GX34
RefSeq (mRNA)	NM_001281956; NM_052896	NM_001281955; NM_001033413
RefSeq (protein)	NP_001268885; NP_443128	NP_001268884
Location (UCSC)	Chr 1: 33.51 – 34.17 Mb	Chr 4: 127.88 – 128.46 Mb
PubMed search
- Wikidata
View/Edit Human	View/Edit Mouse

CUB and sushi domain-containing protein 2 is a protein that in humans is encoded by the CSMD2 gene.
