= Decay-accelerating factor =

Mammalian protein found in humans

CD55
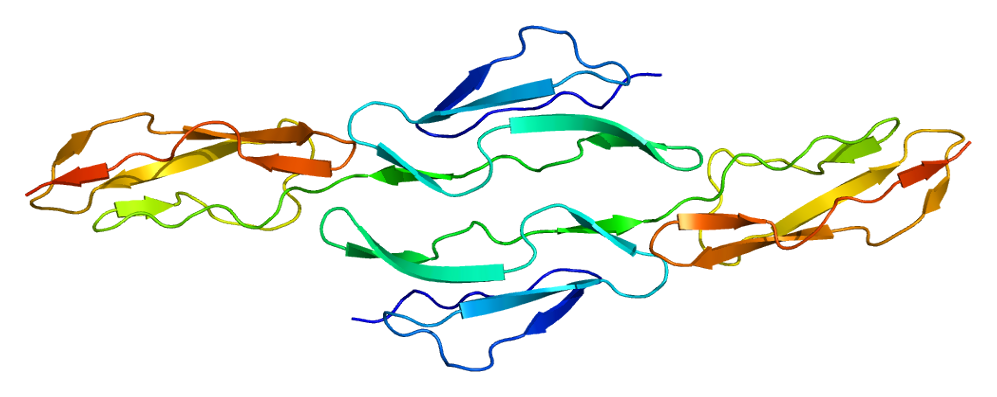

Identifiers
- Aliases: CD55, CR, CROM, DAF, TC, CD55 molecule (Cromer blood group), CHAPLE
- External IDs: OMIM: 125240; MGI: 104849; GeneCards: CD55
Available structures
| PDB | Ortholog search: PDBe RCSB |
| PDB | List of PDB id codes 1H03, 1H04, 1H2P, 1H2Q, 1M11, 1NWV, 1OJV, 1OJW, 1OJY, 1OK1, 1OK2, 1OK3, 1OK9, 1UOT, 1UPN, 2C8I, 2QZD, 2QZF, 2QZH, 3IYP, 3J24, 5FOA |

Gene location (Human)
| Chr. | Chromosome 1 (human) |
| Band | 1q32.2 | Start | 207,321,519 bp |
| Band | 1q32.2 | End | 207,386,804 bp |

Gene location (Mouse)
| Chr. | Chromosome 1 (mouse) |
| Band | 1 E4|1 56.89 cM | Start | 130,316,274 bp |
| Band | 1 E4|1 56.89 cM | End | 130,350,746 bp |
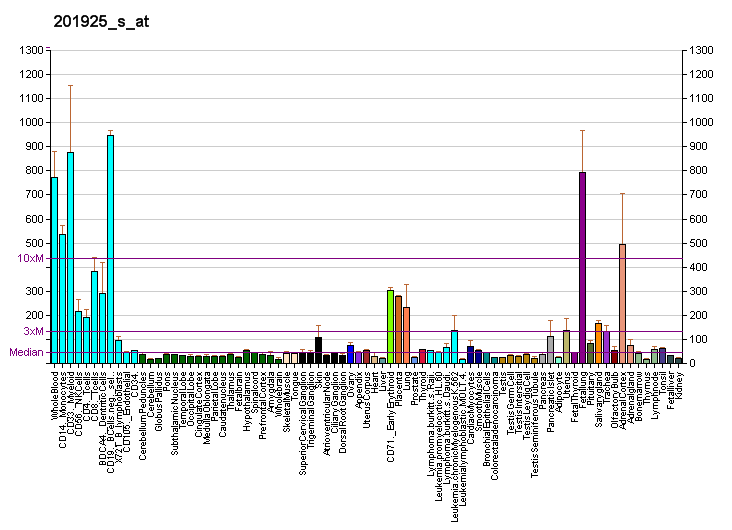

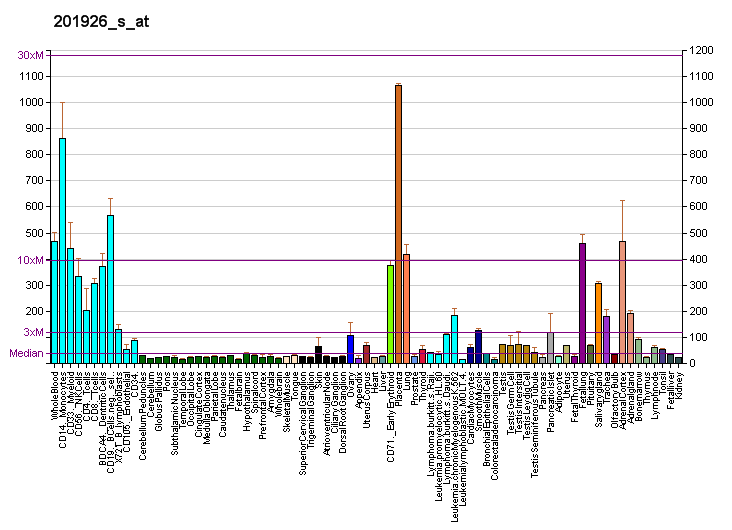
RNA expression pattern
| Bgee | Human / Mouse (ortholog); Top expressed in: parotid gland; palpebral conjunctiva; lower lobe of lung; right lung; nasal epithelium; mucosa of paranasal sinus; upper lobe of lung; upper lobe of left lung; blood; synovial joint / Top expressed in: spermatid; spermatocyte; seminiferous tubule; rectum; zygote; secondary oocyte; embryo; blastocyst; Hindgut; primary oocyte; More reference expression data |
| BioGPS | More reference expression data |
Gene ontology
| Molecular function | virus receptor activity; protein binding; lipid binding |
| Cellular component | membrane; Golgi membrane; plasma membrane; integral component of plasma membrane; transport vesicle; extracellular region; cell surface; membrane raft; anchored component of membrane; extracellular exosome; endoplasmic reticulum-Golgi intermediate compartment membrane; secretory granule membrane; ficolin-1-rich granule membrane |
| Biological process | regulation of lipopolysaccharide-mediated signaling pathway; immune system process; positive regulation of cytosolic calcium ion concentration; positive regulation of CD4-positive, alpha-beta T cell proliferation; respiratory burst; endoplasmic reticulum to Golgi vesicle-mediated transport; positive regulation of CD4-positive, alpha-beta T cell activation; CD4-positive, alpha-beta T cell cytokine production; complement activation, classical pathway; viral process; regulation of complement activation; innate immune response; viral entry into host cell; neutrophil degranulation; negative regulation of complement activation; regulation of complement-dependent cytotoxicity |
Sources:Amigo / QuickGO
Orthologs
| Databases | NCBI: entry; OMA: entry |
| Species | Human | Mouse |
| Entrez | 1604 | 13137 |
| Ensembl | ENSG00000196352 | ENSMUSG00000026401 |
| UniProt | P08174 | Q61476 |
| RefSeq (mRNA) | NM_000574; NM_001114543; NM_001114544; NM_001114752; NM_001300902 NM_001300903; NM_001300904 | NM_007827; NM_001317361 |
| RefSeq (protein) | NP_000565; NP_001108224; NP_001287831; NP_001287832; NP_001287833 | NP_001304290; NP_031853; NP_001391877 |
| Location (UCSC) | Chr 1: 207.32 – 207.39 Mb | Chr 1: 130.32 – 130.35 Mb |
| PubMed search |
- Wikidata
| View/Edit Human | View/Edit Mouse |

Complement decay-accelerating factor, also known as CD55 or DAF, is a protein that, in humans, is encoded by the CD55 gene.

DAF regulates the complement system on the cell surface. It recognizes C4b and C3b fragments that are created during activation of C4 (classical or lectin pathway) or C3 (alternative pathway). Interaction of DAF with cell-associated C4b of the classical and lectin pathways interferes with the conversion of C2 to C2b, thereby preventing formation of the C4b2a C3-convertase, and interaction of DAF with C3b of the alternative pathway interferes with the conversion of factor B to Bb by factor D, thereby preventing formation of the C3bBb C3 convertase of the alternative pathway. Thus, by limiting the amplification convertases of the complement cascade, DAF indirectly blocks the formation of the membrane attack complex.

This glycoprotein is broadly distributed among hematopoietic and non-hematopoietic cells. It is a determinant for the Cromer blood group system.

== Structure ==
DAF is a 70 kDa membrane protein that attaches to the cell membrane via a glycophosphatidylinositol (GPI) anchor.

DAF contains four complement control protein (CCP) repeats with a single N-linked glycan positioned between CCP1 and CCP2. CCP2, CCP3, CCP4 and three consecutive lysine residues in a positively charged pocket between CCP2 and CCP3 are involved in its inhibition of the alternate complement pathway. CCP2 and CCP3 alone are involved in its inhibition of the classical pathway.

== Pathology ==
=== Paroxysmal nocturnal hemoglobinuria ===
Because DAF is a GPI-anchored protein, its expression is reduced in persons with mutations that reduce GPI levels such as those with paroxysmal nocturnal hemoglobinuria (PNH). In PNH disorder, red blood cells with very low levels of DAF and CD59 undergo complement-mediated hemolysis. Symptoms include low red blood cell count (anemia), fatigue, and episodes of dark colored urine and other complications.

=== Infectious diseases ===
DAF is used as a receptor by some coxsackieviruses and other enteroviruses. Recombinant soluble DAF-Fc has been tested in mice as an anti-enterovirus therapy for heart damage; however, the human enterovirus that was tested binds much more strongly to human DAF than to mouse or rat DAF. Echoviruses and coxsackie B viruses that use human decay-accelerating factor (DAF) as a receptor do not bind the rodent analogues of DAF. and DAF-Fc has yet to be tested in humans.

Binding of DAF to human HIV-1 when the virons are budding from the surface of infected cells protects HIV-1 from complement mediated lysis.

== See also ==
- List of human clusters of differentiation
- CD59
