= SEZ6 =

Protein-coding gene in the species Homo sapiens

Identifiers
- Aliases: SEZ6, BSRPC, seizure related 6 homolog
- External IDs: OMIM: 616666; MGI: 104745; GeneCards: SEZ6

Gene location (Human)
Chr.	Chromosome 17 (human)
Band	17q11.2	Start	28,954,901 bp
Band	17q11.2	End	29,006,440 bp

Gene location (Mouse)
Chr.	Chromosome 11 (mouse)
Band	11 B5|11 46.74 cM	Start	77,821,626 bp
Band	11 B5|11 46.74 cM	End	77,869,874 bp
RNA expression pattern
Bgee	Human / Mouse (ortholog); Top expressed in: ganglionic eminence; right hemisphere of cerebellum; nucleus accumbens; caudate nucleus; putamen; prefrontal cortex; right frontal lobe; cingulate gyrus; anterior cingulate cortex; amygdala / Top expressed in: olfactory tubercle; superior frontal gyrus; nucleus accumbens; subiculum; CA3 field; perirhinal cortex; primary visual cortex; entorhinal cortex; dentate gyrus of hippocampal formation granule cell; anterior amygdaloid area; More reference expression data
BioGPS	n/a
Orthologs
Databases	NCBI: entry; OMA: entry
Species	Human	Mouse
Entrez	124925	20370
Ensembl	ENSG00000063015	ENSMUSG00000000632
UniProt	Q53EL9	Q7TSK2
RefSeq (mRNA)	NM_001098635; NM_001290202; NM_178860	NM_001291225; NM_021286
RefSeq (protein)	NP_001092105; NP_001277131; NP_849191	NP_001278154; NP_067261
Location (UCSC)	Chr 17: 28.95 – 29.01 Mb	Chr 11: 77.82 – 77.87 Mb
PubMed search
- Wikidata
View/Edit Human	View/Edit Mouse

Seizure protein 6 homolog is a protein that in humans is encoded by the SEZ6 gene.
