= Complement deficiency =

- Complement pathway (normal)
- Specialty: Hematology
- Symptoms: Recurring infection, rheumatic disease
- Causes: Can be inherited or acquired
- Diagnostic method: CH50 measurement, Plasma level
- Treatment: Immunosuppressive therapy

Complement deficiency is an immunodeficiency of absent or suboptimal functioning of one of the complement system proteins. Because of redundancies in the immune system, many complement disorders are never diagnosed. Some studies estimate that less than 10% are identified. Hypocomplementemia may be used more generally to refer to decreased complement levels, while secondary complement disorder means decreased complement levels that are not directly due to a genetic cause but secondary to another medical condition.

== Types ==
- Disorders of the proteins that act to inhibit the complement system (such as C1-inhibitor) can lead to an overactive response, causing conditions such as hereditary angioedema.
- Disorders of the proteins that act to activate the complement system (such as C3) can lead to an underactive response, causing greater susceptibility to infections.

== Signs and symptoms ==
The following symptoms (signs) are consistent with complement deficiency in general:

- Recurring infection
- Auto-immune disorders
- Glomerulonephritis
- Joint problems (manifestation)
- Lung function (MBL variant alleles)
- Angioedema
- Dermatomyositis
- Vasculitis
- Anaphylactoid purpura

=== Complications ===
Neisseria, a possible complication

Vaccinations for encapsulated organisms (e.g., Neisseria meningitidis and Streptococcus pneumoniae) is crucial for preventing infections in complement deficiencies. Among the possible complications are the following:

- Deficiencies of the terminal complement components increases susceptibility to infections by Neisseria.

== Causes ==
The cause of complement deficiency is genetics (though cases of an acquired nature do exist post infection). The majority of complement deficiencies are inherited as autosomal recessive conditions, while properdin deficiency occurs through X-linked inheritance. MBL deficiency can be inherited by either manner.

=== Inherited ===
- Properdin deficiency is an X-linked disorder that also causes susceptibility to Neisseria infections.
- C1-inhibitor deficiency or hereditary angioedema will have low C4 with normal C1 levels.

=== Acquired ===
Acquired hypocomplementemia may occur in the setting of bone infections (osteomyelitis), infection of the lining of the heart (endocarditis), and cryoglobulinemia. Systemic lupus erythematosus is associated with low C3 and C4. Membranoproliferative glomerulonephritis usually has low C3.

== Mechanism ==
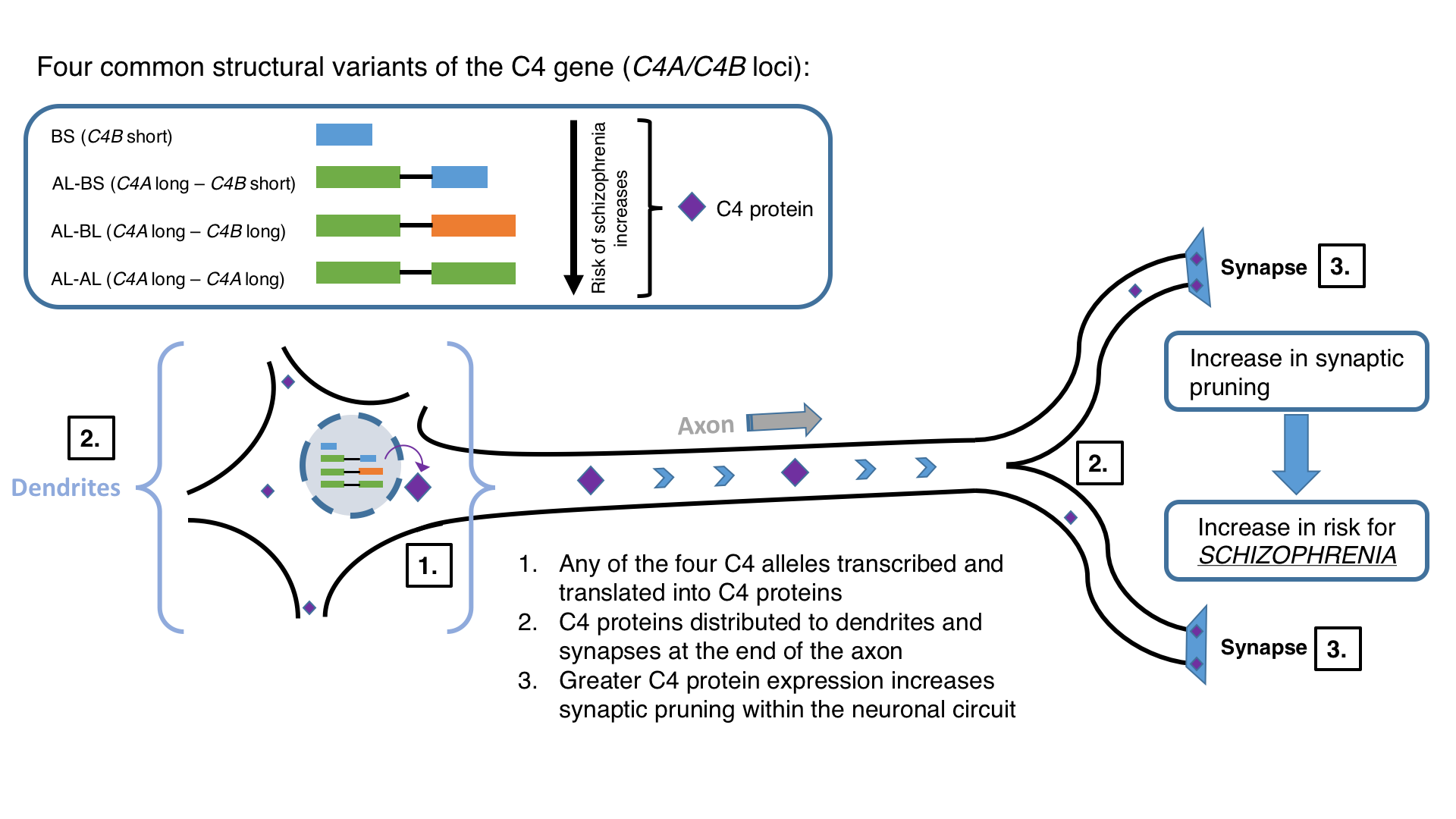
Model of common structural genes and their possible contribution to the development of schizophrenia (as defined in the Sekar et al. article)

The mechanism of complement deficiency consists of:

- C2: In regard to C2 deficiency, about 5 different mutations in the C2 gene are responsible. In turn, immune function decreases and infection opportunities increase. One of the most common mutations deletes 28 DNA nucleotides from the C2 gene. Therefore, no C2 protein which can help make C3-convertase is produced. Ultimately, this delays/decreases immune response.
- C3: In terms of deficiency of C3, it has been found that 17 mutations in the C3 gene cause problems with C3. This rare condition mutates or prevents C3 protein from forming, lowering the immune system's ability to protect.
- C4: C4 deficiency is highly associated with systemic lupus erythematosus. Aβ42, a protein involved in Alzheimer's disease, can cause activation of C4 (even in plasma deficient of C1q). At least one study indicates that the genetic variation of C4 plays a role in schizophrenia.

== Diagnosis ==
Complement tests
C4 (C)	FB (A)	C3	CH50	Conditions
·	↓	↓	↓	PSG, C3 NeF AA
↓	·	↓	·	HAE, C4D
·	·	·	↓	TCPD
↓	·/↓	↓	↓	SLE
↑	↑	↑	↑	inflammation

The diagnostic tests used to diagnose a complement deficiency include:

- CH50 measurement
- Immunochemical methods/test
- C3 deficiency screening
- Mannose-binding lectin (lab study)
- Plasma levels/regulatory proteins (lab study)

== Treatment ==
In terms of management for complement deficiency, immunosuppressive therapy should be used depending on the disease presented. A C1-INH concentrate can be used for angio-oedema (C1-INH deficiency).

Pneumococcus and Haemophilus infections can be prevented via immunization. Epsilon-aminocaproic acid could be used to treat hereditary C1-INH deficiency, though the possible side effect of intravascular thrombosis should be weighed.

== Epidemiology ==
C2 deficiency has a prevalence of 1 in about 20,000 people in Western countries.

== See also ==
- Paroxysmal nocturnal hemoglobinuria
