= Complement C1q subunit A =

Protein-coding gene in humans

C1QA
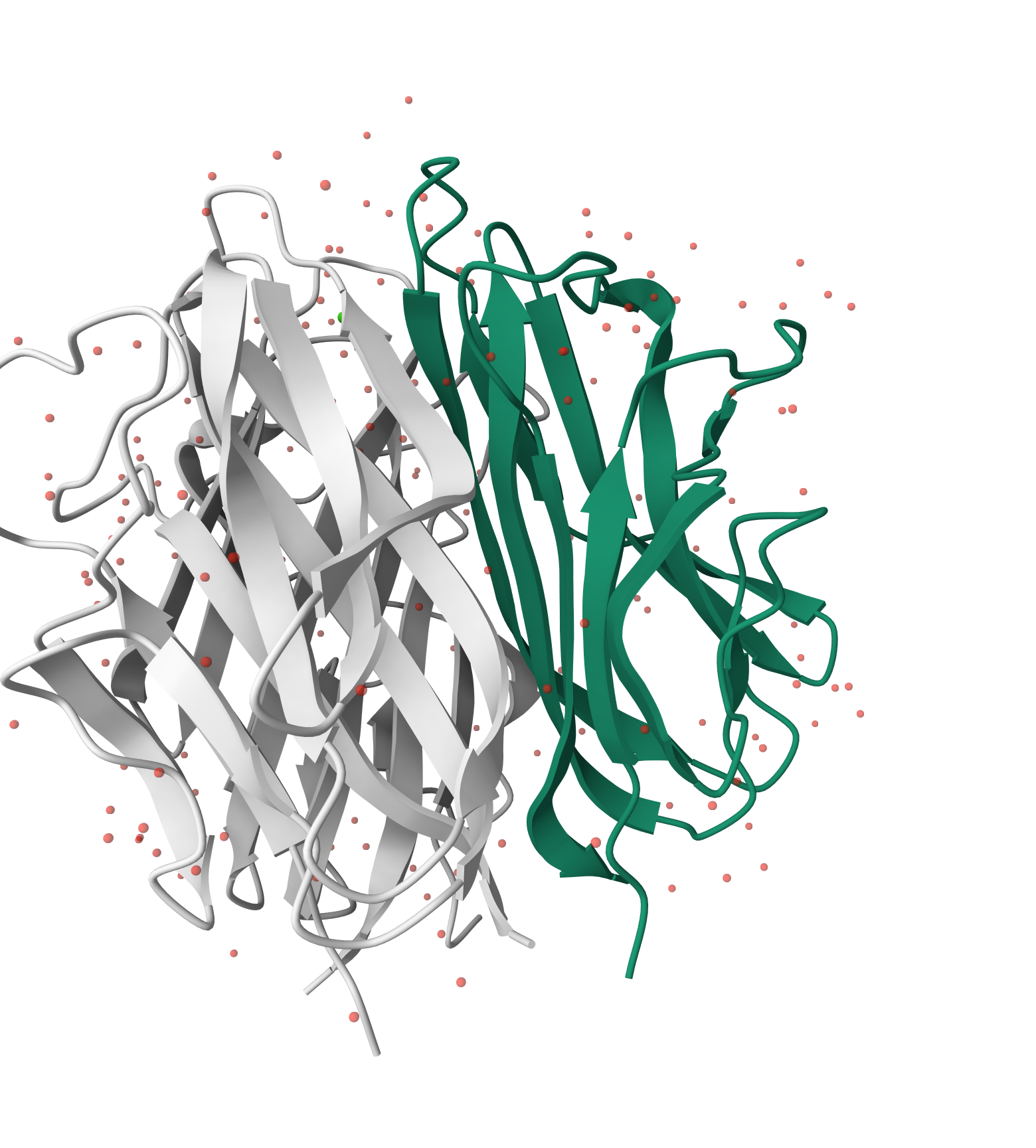

Identifiers
- Aliases: C1QA, complement C1q A chain
- External IDs: OMIM: 120550; MGI: 88223; GeneCards: C1QA
Available structures
PDB	Ortholog search: PDBe RCSB
PDB	List of PDB id codes 1PK6, 2JG8, 2JG9, 2WNU, 2WNV, 5HZF, 5HKJ

Gene location (Human)
Chr.	Chromosome 1 (human)
Band	1p36.12	Start	22,635,077 bp
Band	1p36.12	End	22,639,678 bp

Gene location (Mouse)
Chr.	Chromosome 4 (mouse)
Band	4 D3|4 69.05 cM	Start	136,623,228 bp
Band	4 D3|4 69.05 cM	End	136,626,114 bp
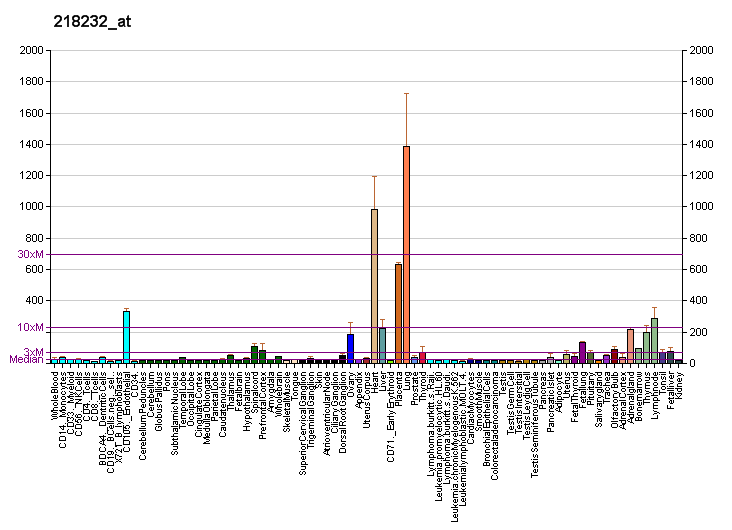
RNA expression pattern
Bgee	Human / Mouse (ortholog); Top expressed in: spleen; right lung; decidua; gallbladder; right coronary artery; lymph node; right adrenal cortex; upper lobe of left lung; lower lobe of lung; gastric mucosa / Top expressed in: stroma of bone marrow; spleen; mesenteric lymph nodes; calvaria; ankle; ankle joint; thymus; tibiofemoral joint; interventricular septum; subcutaneous adipose tissue; More reference expression data
BioGPS	More reference expression data
Gene ontology
Molecular function	protein binding; serine-type endopeptidase activity; amyloid-beta binding
Cellular component	extracellular region; collagen; complement component C1 complex; collagen-containing extracellular matrix; synapse; postsynapse; amyloid-beta complex
Biological process	immune system process; complement activation; cell-cell signaling; complement activation, classical pathway; response to iron ion; innate immune response; proteolysis; regulation of complement activation; ageing; neuron remodeling; synapse organization; positive regulation of astrocyte activation; synapse pruning; complement-mediated synapse pruning; vertebrate eye-specific patterning; positive regulation of neuron death; positive regulation of microglial cell activation
Sources:Amigo / QuickGO
Orthologs
Databases	NCBI: entry; OMA: entry
Species	Human	Mouse
Entrez	712	12259
Ensembl	ENSG00000173372	ENSMUSG00000036887
UniProt	P02745	P98086
RefSeq (mRNA)	NM_015991; NM_001347465; NM_001347466	NM_007572
RefSeq (protein)	NP_001334394; NP_001334395; NP_057075	NP_031598
Location (UCSC)	Chr 1: 22.64 – 22.64 Mb	Chr 4: 136.62 – 136.63 Mb
PubMed search
- Wikidata
View/Edit Human	View/Edit Mouse

Complement C1q subcomponent subunit A is a protein that in humans is encoded by the C1QA gene.

This gene encodes a major constituent of the human complement system subcomponent C1q. C1q associates with C1r and C1s in order to yield the first component of the serum complement system. Deficiency of C1q has been associated with lupus erythematosus and glomerulonephritis. C1q is composed of 18 polypeptide chains: six A-chains, six B-chains, and six C-chains. Each chain contains a collagen-like region located near the N terminus and a C-terminal globular region. The A-, B-, and C-chains are arranged in the order A-C-B on chromosome 1. This gene encodes the A-chain polypeptide of human complement subcomponent C1q.
