= Complement 2 deficiency =

- Other names: C2 deficiency, Complement component 2 deficiency, C2D.
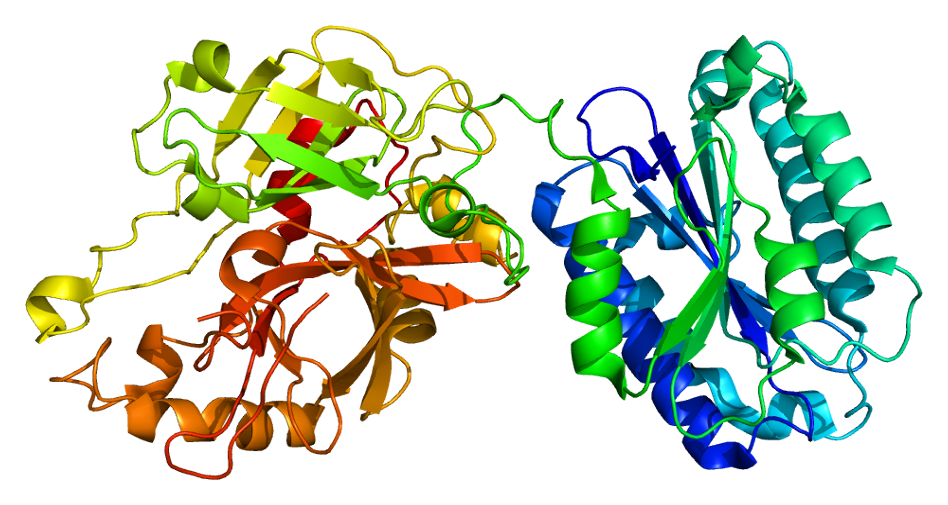
- Structure of the C2 protein
- Specialty: Hematology

Complement 2 deficiency is a type of complement deficiency caused by any one of several different alterations in the structure of complement component 2.

It has been associated with an increase in infections.

It can present similarly to systemic lupus erythematosus (SLE).

== Signs and symptoms ==
C2D is linked to bacterial infections, especially encapsulated bacterial infections, as well as a risk of Systemic Lupus Erythematosus (SLE) or SLE-like disease.

Complement deficiency has historically been associated with early, severe bacterial infections among children. Infection susceptibility is frequently observed.

C2D is linked to abnormalities in serum immunoglobulin levels, such as lower IgG2 and IgG4 levels, which could contribute to raised infection susceptibility. More than half of 40 C2D patients in a study had Streptococcus pneumoniae-related invasive infection, primarily meningitis or sepsis. Haemophilus influenza type b and Neisseria meningitis are two other infections commonly seen in C2D patients.

=== Complications ===
In roughly 10% of patients, a C2 deficiency is linked to an illness that resembles SLE. Clinical manifestations of this SLE-like illness include fever, rash, arthritis, and glomerulonephritis. With a low titer, ANA may be positive. Anti-double-stranded DNA antibodies are uncommon. Anti-Ro antibodies will be present in approximately 50% of the population.

SLE associated with C2D is regarded as less severe when compared to other complement deficiencies. In SLE patients with C2D, skin and joint involvement are common, and severe persistent cutaneous and/or subacute cutaneous lupus erythematosus can occur. Renal and neuropsychiatric disease, on the other hand, is thought to be uncommon in these SLE patients.

C2 deficiency has also been linked to rheumatic diseases such as membrane glomerulonephritis, Henoch-Schonlein purpura, and dermatomyositis. Subacute cutaneous lupus, polymyositis, and Hodgkin's lymphoma have also been linked.

== See also ==
- Systemic Lupus Erythematosus
- Complement deficiency
