= Total complement activity =

- Purpose: assess the level of functioning of the complement system

Total complement activity (TCA) refers to a series of tests that determine the functioning of the complement system in an individual.

== Tests ==
Complement tests
C4 (C)	FB (A)	C3	CH50	Conditions
·	↓	↓	↓	PSG, C3 NeF AA
↓	·	↓	·	HAE, C4D
·	·	·	↓	TCPD
↓	·/↓	↓	↓	SLE
↑	↑	↑	↑	inflammation

A variety of tests can be used to measure TCA, but the most commonly used on is the CH50 test. Other tests include the liposome immunoassay (LIA), single tube titration method, and the plate-hemolysis method.

=== CH50 Procedure ===
The test is based on the capacity of an individual's serum to lyse sheep erythrocytes coated with anti-sheep antibodies (preferably rabbit IgG). The individual's serum is diluted until a minimum concentration of 50% of the sheep's red blood cells are lysed. This is recorded as the CH50.

CH50 tests the classical complement pathway and thus requires functioning C1-C9 factors.

=== CH50 Interpretation ===
If an individual has deficient or malfunctioning complement factors, then at a baseline they have decreased capacity to lyse the erythrocytes. Therefore, any dilution to their serum would further impair this functioning, meaning that a lower dilution needs to be reached to achieve 50% capacity. In contrast, any individual with increased complement levels or activity would have an elevated CH50 since increasing dilution would be necessary to reach the 50% lyse marking.

Decreased CH50 values may be seen in cirrhosis or hepatitis as a result of impaired complement production in the liver. It can also be seen in systemic lupus erythematosus as a result of increased usage of complement factors due to the pathology of the autoimmune condition. It is decreased during attacks of hereditary angioedema (but those with the disease have a normal value in between attacks).

Increased CH50 values means that their complement is hyperfunctional relative to normal, and this may be seen in cancer or ulcerative colitis.

One can interpret the CH50 value along with the individual's complement factor values to help determine the etiology. For example, if and individual has normal C3/C4 values but a decreased CH50, that can indicate a terminal complement pathway deficiency while if one has low C3 and CH50 values that can indicate an autoimmune condition such as systemic lupus erythematosus.

Alternative pathway hemolytic assay ("AH50") can be used in conjunction to indicate if there is a terminal pathway deficiency (CH50 and AH50 both are low), classical pathway deficiency (CH50 low, AH50 normal) or alternative pathway deficiency (AH50 low, CH50 normal).
