= C1 complex =

Protein complex

The C1 complex (complement component 1, C1) is a protein complex involved in the complement system. It is the first component of the classical complement pathway and is composed of the subcomponents C1q, C1r and C1s.

== Structure ==
The C1 complex is ~790 kDa and is composed of 1 molecule of C1q, 2 molecules of C1r and 2 molecules of C1s, or C1qr^{2}s^{2}.

== Function ==
The classical and alternative complement pathways.

Activation of the C1 complex initiates the classical complement pathway. This occurs when C1q binds to antigen-antibody complexes. The antibodies IgM or certain subclasses of IgG complexed with antigens are able to initiate the complement system: a single pentameric IgM can initiate the pathway, while several monomeric IgG molecules are needed. C1q can also be activated in other ways, for example by binding to pentraxins such as C-reactive protein or directly to the surface of pathogens.

Such binding of C1q leads to conformational changes in the C1q molecule, which activates the associated C1r molecules. Active C1r cleaves the C1s molecules, activating them. Active C1s splits C4 and then C2, producing C4a, C4b, C2a and C2b. The classical pathway C3-convertase (C4bC2b complex) is created, which promotes cleavage of C3.
