= C1QTNF5 =

Identifiers
- Aliases: C1QTNF5, CTRP5, C1q and tumor necrosis factor related protein 5, C1q and TNF related 5, MFRP
- External IDs: OMIM: 608752; MGI: 2385958; GeneCards: C1QTNF5
Available structures
PDB	Ortholog search: PDBe RCSB
PDB	List of PDB id codes 4F3J, 4NN0

Gene location (Human)
Chr.	Chromosome 11 (human)
Band	11q23.3	Start	119,338,942 bp
Band	11q23.3	End	119,340,940 bp

Gene location (Mouse)
Chr.	Chromosome 9 (mouse)
Band	9 A5.1|9 24.62 cM	Start	44,018,542 bp
Band	9 A5.1|9 24.62 cM	End	44,020,484 bp
RNA expression pattern
Bgee	Human / Mouse (ortholog); Top expressed in: apex of heart; gallbladder; ascending aorta; subcutaneous adipose tissue; right coronary artery; gastric mucosa; tibial arteries; right lung; left coronary artery; myometrium / Top expressed in: vasculature of organ; olfactory bulb; quadriceps femoris muscle; choroid plexus; striatum of neuraxis; adrenal gland; choroid plexus of lateral ventricle; urinary bladder; cerebellum; hippocampus proper; More reference expression data
BioGPS	n/a
Gene ontology
Molecular function	identical protein binding
Cellular component	extracellular region; collagen; cell projection; membrane; lateral plasma membrane; apical plasma membrane; plasma membrane; transport vesicle; bicellular tight junction; extracellular space
Biological process	protein secretion; protein trimerization; inner ear development
Sources:Amigo / QuickGO
Orthologs
Databases	NCBI: entry; OMA: entry
Species	Human	Mouse
Entrez	114902	235312
Ensembl	ENSG00000223953	ENSMUSG00000079592
UniProt	Q9BXJ0	Q8K480; Q8K479
RefSeq (mRNA)	NM_015645; NM_001278431	NM_001040631; NM_001040632; NM_001190313; NM_001190319; NM_145613
RefSeq (protein)	NP_001265360; NP_056460	NP_001177243; NP_667337; NP_001035721; NP_001035722; NP_001177242 NP_001177248; NP_663588
Location (UCSC)	Chr 11: 119.34 – 119.34 Mb	Chr 9: 44.02 – 44.02 Mb
PubMed search
- Wikidata
View/Edit Human	View/Edit Mouse

C1q and tumor necrosis factor related protein 5, also known as C1QTNF5, is a protein which in humans is encoded by the C1QTNF5 gene, associated with late-onset retinal degeneration( otherwise known as L-ORD).

The C1QTNF5 gene secreted and membrane-linked to a protein which is strongly expressed in retinal pigment epithelium cells.

== Structure ==
The structure of C1q and Tumor Necrosis Factor Related Protein 5 (C1QTNF5) which is also called CTRP5 has three essential domains. The first domain is a single peptide which is located in N-terminal, the second domain is a collage domain and the third domain is a globular complement 1q (gC1q) that exists in the C-terminal domain. The single mutation S163R is found in the gC1q domain which is the main reason for Late-onset retinal degeneration disease(L-ORD). C1QTNF5 is a part of the C1q family. However, there is a unique feature of the structure of C1QTNF5 that it does not own a Ca 2+ binding site as other members of the C1q family.

Crystal structure of C1QTNF5 has been taken by Xiongying and Krzysztof and it has two characteristics. One is that the structure of C1QTNF5 seems not to have a Ca 2+ binding site in order to its stability. Also, it is necessary for the function of the members of the C1q family. Another feature is having an unusual sequence which is (F181, F182, G183, G184, W185, P186) that generate a hydrophobic field. In this area, S163 and F182 build H bond, However, the mutation S163 will make a disruption to the H bond.

== Function ==
The CTRP5 protein is a member of the C1q / tumor necrosis factor superfamily, which shows diverse functions including cell adhesion and as components of the basement membrane.

== Clinical significance ==
A mutation in the C1QTNF5 gene causes late-onset retinal degeneration. More specifically, a single missense mutation (S163R) in the encoded C1QTNF5 protein causes the Late-onset retinal degeneration disease(L-ORD).

Retinal degeneration is a genetic disorder that originates from the retina, a thin layer located towards the back part of the eye that senses for light. C1QTNF5 gene associated with L-ORD leads to poor eyesight in dim to dark light which eventually evolves into night blindness known as nyctalopia.

The mutation in the S163R is found in the globular c1q domain. C1q domain binds to ligands throughout the body that help boost immune responses. The C1q protein can distinguish the different types of potential bacteria and virus ligands that can bind to the C1q domain. When there is a mutation in the C1q protein the globular subunits within the C1q that contain binding cites for immune lignands become halted causing L-ORD which can lead to retinal pigment epithelium failure. Retinal pigment epithelium (RPE) helps absorb light through binding to photoreceptors helping to regulate light exposure.

S163R mutation in the C1QTNF5 protein is an autosomal dominant disorder that is genetically inherited by one parent being a carrier for the mutation. Those affected do not begin to see symptoms such as (trouble adjusting to dark or dim areas) until their 40's and early 50's, the reason for the delay in S163 mutation in the C1QTNF5 protein is still unknown, hence the name for the eye disorder Late -onset retinal degeneration beginning in a person's late stages of life.
