= Complement 4 deficiency =

- Specialty: Immunology

Complement tests
C4 (C)	FB (A)	C3	CH50	Conditions
·	↓	↓	↓	PSG, C3 NeF AA
↓	·	↓	·	HAE, C4D
·	·	·	↓	TCPD
↓	·/↓	↓	↓	SLE
↑	↑	↑	↑	inflammation

Complement 4 deficiency is a genetic condition affecting complement component 4.

It can present with lupus-like symptoms.
