= Ciprocopan =

Clinical data
- Trade names: 优可盼
- Other names: HSK39297; HSK-39297; NXP100; NXP-100; ciprocopan succinate
- Routes of administration: Oral

Legal status
- Legal status: Rx-only (China)

Identifiers
- IUPAC name: 4-[(2S,4R)-4-Cyclopropyl-1-[[7-methyl-5-(trideuteriomethoxy)-1H-indol-4-yl]methyl]piperidin-2-yl]benzoic acid
- CAS Number: 3053270-05-3
- PubChem CID: 176080762
- IUPHAR/BPS: 14472
- ChemSpider: 138530922
- UNII: KB43WP5CDH

Chemical and physical data
- Formula: C_{26}H_{27}D_{3}N_{2}O_{3}
- Molar mass: 421.554 g·mol^{−1}
- 3D model (JSmol): Interactive image
- SMILES: [2H]C([2H])([2H])OC1=C(C2=C(C(=C1)C)NC=C2)CN3CC[C@H](C[C@H]3C4=CC=C(C=C4)C(=O)O)C5CC5
- InChI: InChI=1S/C26H30N2O3/c1-16-13-24(31-2)22(21-9-11-27-25(16)21)15-28-12-10-20(17-3-4-17)14-23(28)18-5-7-19(8-6-18)26(29)30/h5-9,11,13,17,20,23,27H,3-4,10,12,14-15H2,1-2H3,(H,29,30)/t20-,23+/m1/s1/i2D3; Key:VHBASIXWLLDPFC-HRFXIYCZSA-N

Ciprocopan (INN) is a small-molecule inhibitor of complement factor B used for the treatment of paroxysmal nocturnal hemoglobinuria (PNH). It was developed by Haisco Pharmaceutical Group and is administered orally once daily as the succinate salt.

In July 2026, ciprocopan was approved in China for the treatment of adult patients with PNH who have not previously received treatment with a complement inhibitor.
