= Terminal complement pathway deficiency =

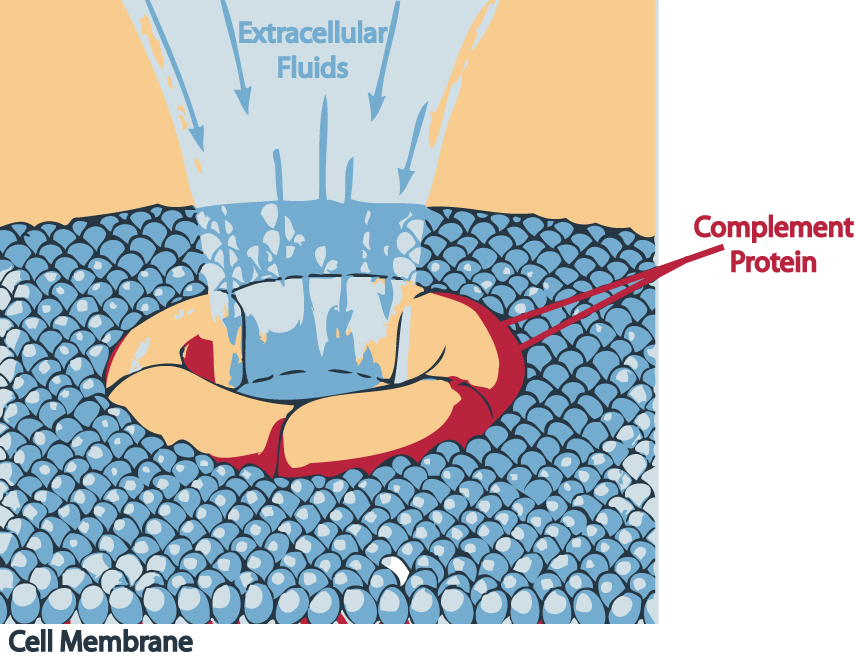
- complement membrane attack complex

Terminal complement pathway deficiency is a genetic condition affecting the complement membrane attack complex (MAC).

It involves deficiencies of C5, C6, C7, and C8. (While C9 is part of the MAC, and deficiencies have been identified, it is not required for cell lysis.)

People with this condition are prone to meningococcal infection. Vaccination may be recommended.

== Diagnosis ==
Suspect terminal complement pathway deficiency in patients with more than one Neisseria infection episode.

Complement tests
C4 (C)	FB (A)	C3	CH50	Conditions
·	↓	↓	↓	PSG, C3 NeF AA
↓	·	↓	·	HAE, C4D
·	·	·	↓	TCPD
↓	·/↓	↓	↓	SLE
↑	↑	↑	↑	inflammation

Initial complement tests often include C3 and C4, but not C5 through C9. Instead, the CH50 result may play a role in diagnosis: if the CH50 level is low but C3 and C4 are normal, then analysis of the individual terminal components may be warranted.

== Treatment ==
Patients with terminal complement pathway deficiency should receive meningococcal and pneumococcal vaccinations. They can receive live vaccines.
