= CFHR5 nephropathy =

- Other names: Troodos nephropathy
- Specialty: Nephrology

Complement factor H-related protein 5 (CFHR5) nephropathy is a form of inherited kidney disease which is endemic in Cyprus and is caused by a mutation in the gene CFHR5. It is thought to affect up to 1:6000 Cypriots but has not been reported in anybody who is not of Cypriot descent.

== Presentation ==
Sometimes the disease is associated with visible blood in the urine, usually at the time of respiratory or other infections and this is thought to result from stimulation of the immune system leading to damage in the kidneys.

== Diagnosis ==
The diagnosis can be confirmed on a blood sample using a genetic test. CFHR5 nephropathy usually presents with microscopic amounts of blood in the urine, detectable on a routine urine dipstick test.

=== Biopsy findings ===
A kidney biopsy in patients with CFHR5 nephropathy classically shows deposition of complement C3 in the kidney, without any detectable immunoglobulins there. This is evidence that the disease is caused by a problem with alternative complement pathway regulation, rather than activation of the complement system by other diseases. In addition, light microscopy often demonstrates histological features of mesangiocapillary glomerulonephritis. CFHR5 Nephropathy is histologically distinguished from dense deposit disease by the absence of dense transformation of the glomerular basement membrane – electron microscopy rather reveals mesangial, subendothelial basement membrane, and occasional subepithelial basement membrane deposits which stain for complement C3.

== Treatment ==
There is no proven therapy for the CFHR5 nephropathy, although research is currently underway to develop ways of preventing kidney failure developing in those affected.

== Prognosis ==
Over time, kidney failure can develop and most men with the disease will eventually require dialysis or kidney transplantation. For reasons which are not understood, women with the disease, although they often have blood in their urine, only rarely develop kidney failure. The disease has been shown to recur following kidney transplantation, however in most cases the kidney transplant has a normal lifespan.
