= Complement factor D =

Class of enzymes

complement factor D (adipsin)
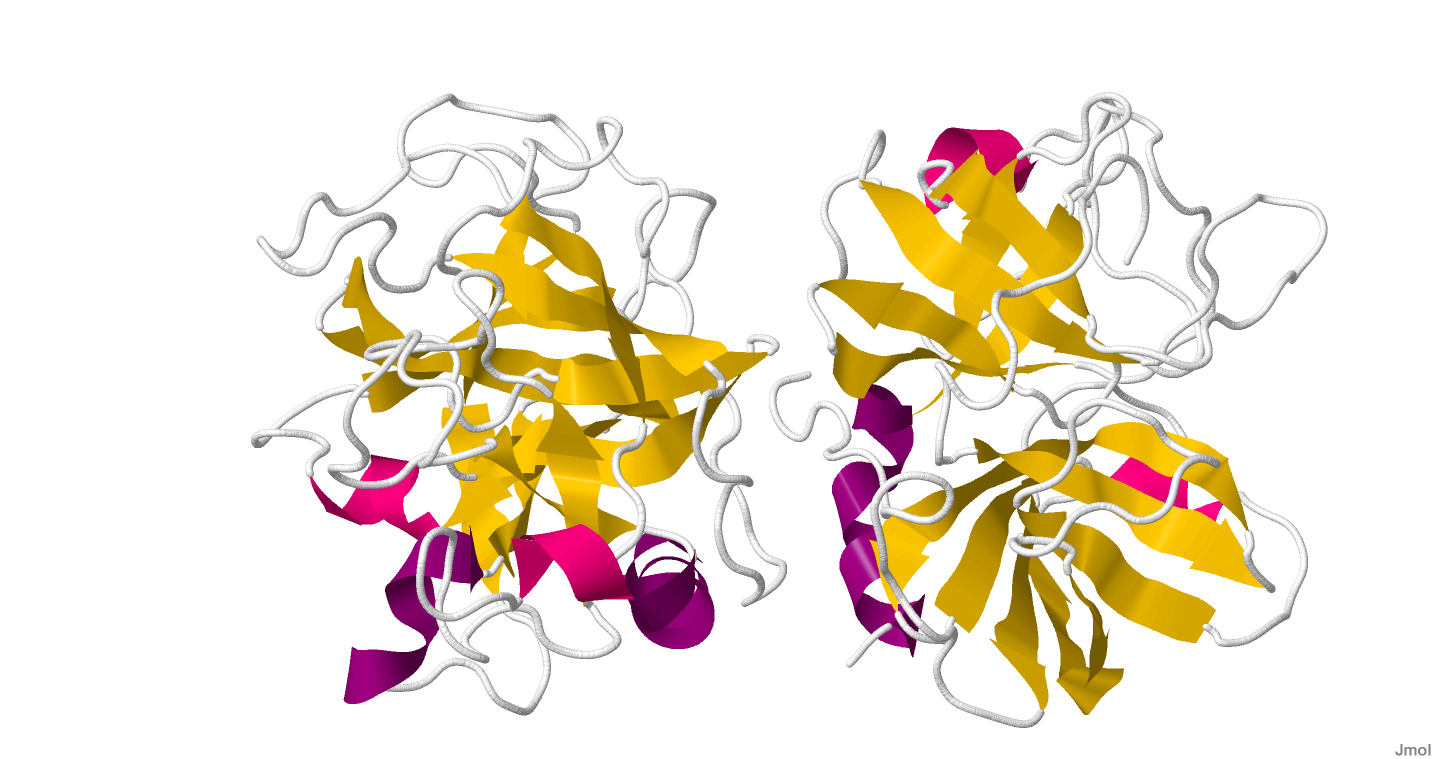
- Factor D in Homo sapiens

Identifiers
- Symbol: CFD
- Alt. symbols: DF, PFD
- NCBI gene: 1675
- HGNC: 2771
- OMIM: 134350
- RefSeq: NM_001928
- UniProt: P00746

Other data
- Locus: Chr. 19 p13.3
Search for
- Structures: Swiss-model
- Domains: InterPro

Factor D (EC 3.4.21.46, C3 proactivator convertase, properdin factor D esterase, factor D (complement), complement factor D, CFD, adipsin) is a protein which in humans is encoded by the CFD gene. Factor D is involved in the alternative complement pathway of the complement system where it cleaves factor B.

== Function ==
The protein encoded by this gene is a member of the trypsin family of serine proteases secreted by adipocytes into the bloodstream. The encoded protein is a component of the alternative complement pathway best known for its role in humoral suppression of infectious agents. Finally, the encoded protein has a high level of expression in fat, suggesting a role for adipose tissue in immune system biology.

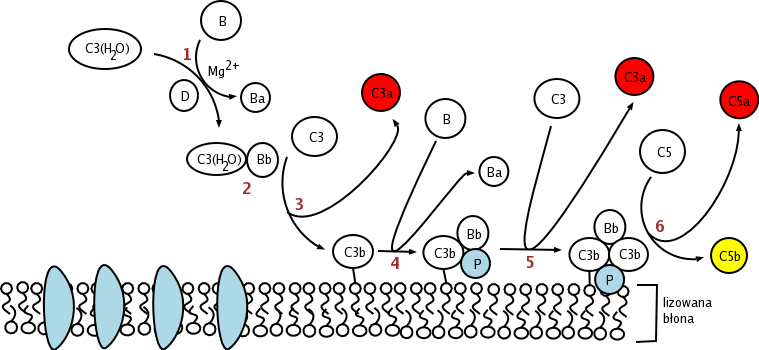
Alternative pathway. ( 4. Is factor D cleaving B to Bb and Ba)

Factor D is a serine protease that stimulates glucose transport for triglyceride accumulation in fats cells and inhibits lipolysis.

== Clinical significance ==
The level of Factor D is decreased in obese patients. This reduction may be due to high activity or resistance but exact cause is not fully known.

== Structure ==
All members of the chymotrypsin family of serine proteases have very similar structures. In all cases, including factor D, there are two antiparallel β-barrel domains with each barrel containing six β-strands with the same typology in all enzymes. The major difference in backbone structure between Factor D and the other serine proteases of the chymotrypsin family is in the surface loops connecting the secondary structural elements. Factor D displays different conformations of major catalytic and substrate-binding residues typically found in the chrotrypsin family. These features suggest the catalytic activity of factor D is prohibited unless conformational changes are induced by a realignment.

== Mechanism of action ==
Factor D is a serine protease present in blood and tissue in an active sequence but self-inhibited conformation. The only known natural substrate of Factor D is Factor B, and cleavage of the Arg^{234}-Lys^{235} scissile bond in Factor B results in two Factor B fragments, Ba and Bb. Before cleavage of the scissile bond in Factor B can occur, Factor B must first bind with C3b before to form the C3bB complex. It is proposed that this conformational change of Factor B in the C3bB complex allows Factor B to fit into the binding site of Factor D.

The catalytic triad of Factor D is composed of Asp^{102}, His^{57} and Ser^{195}. Other key components of Factor D are an Asp^{189}-Arg^{218} salt bridge that stabilizes a self-inhibitory loop (amino acid residues 212 to 218) and His^{57} side chain in the non-canonical conformation. In its inhibited form, the self-inhibitory loop prevents access of Factor B to Factor D. When the self-inhibited conformation of Factor D is approached by the C3bB complex, C3bB displaces the salt bridge in Factor D and results in a new salt bridge between the Arg^{234} of Factor B and Asp^{189} of Factor D. The displacement of the Factor D salt bridge results in a realignment of the self-inhibitory loop and a rotation of the active site histidine side chain, creating the canonical form of Factor D. Cleavage of the scissile bond in Factor B then ensues, releasing fragment Ba and forming C3bBb, the alternative pathway C3-convertase.

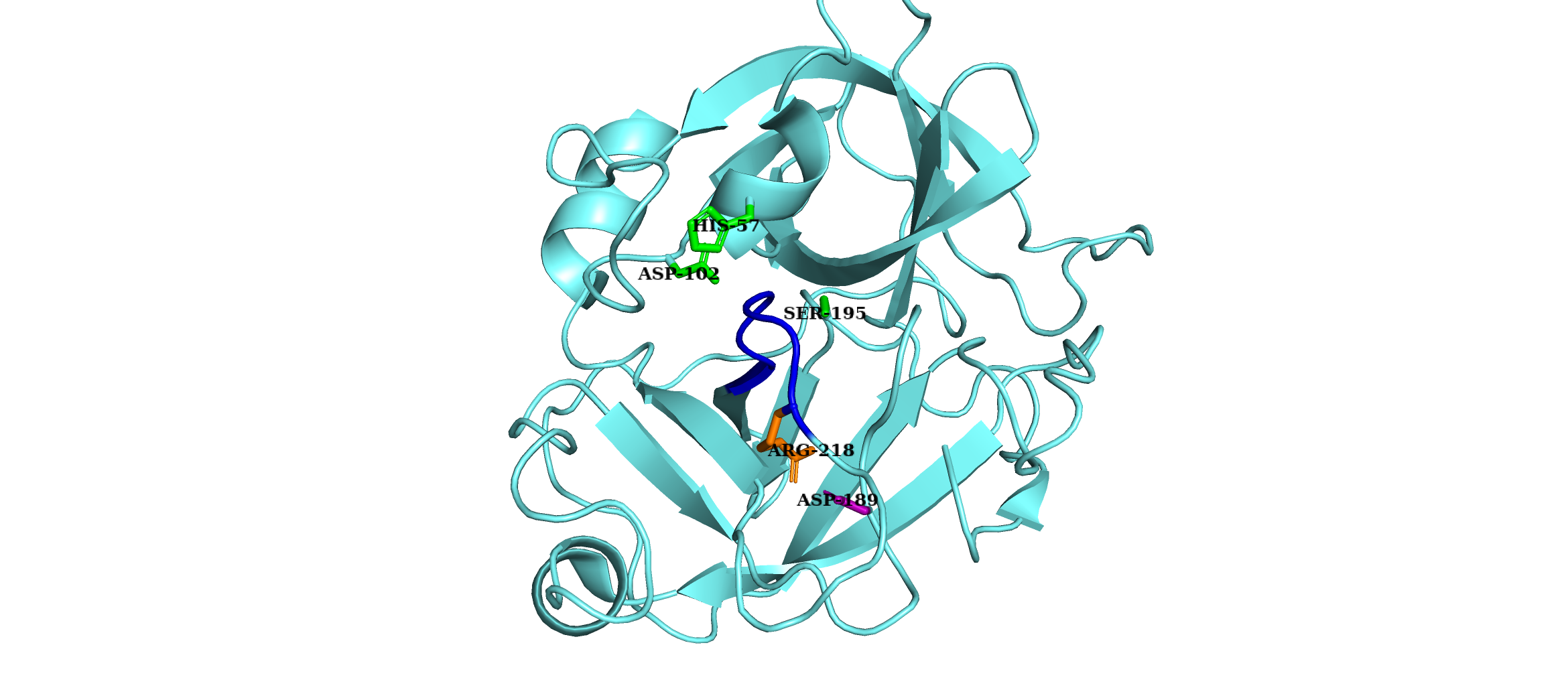
The non-canonical conformation of Factor D is inhibited by the self-inhibitory loop (blue). The Asp-Arg salt bridge (purple and orange side chains, respectively) stabilizes the self-inhibitory loop. The catalytic triad is shown in green.

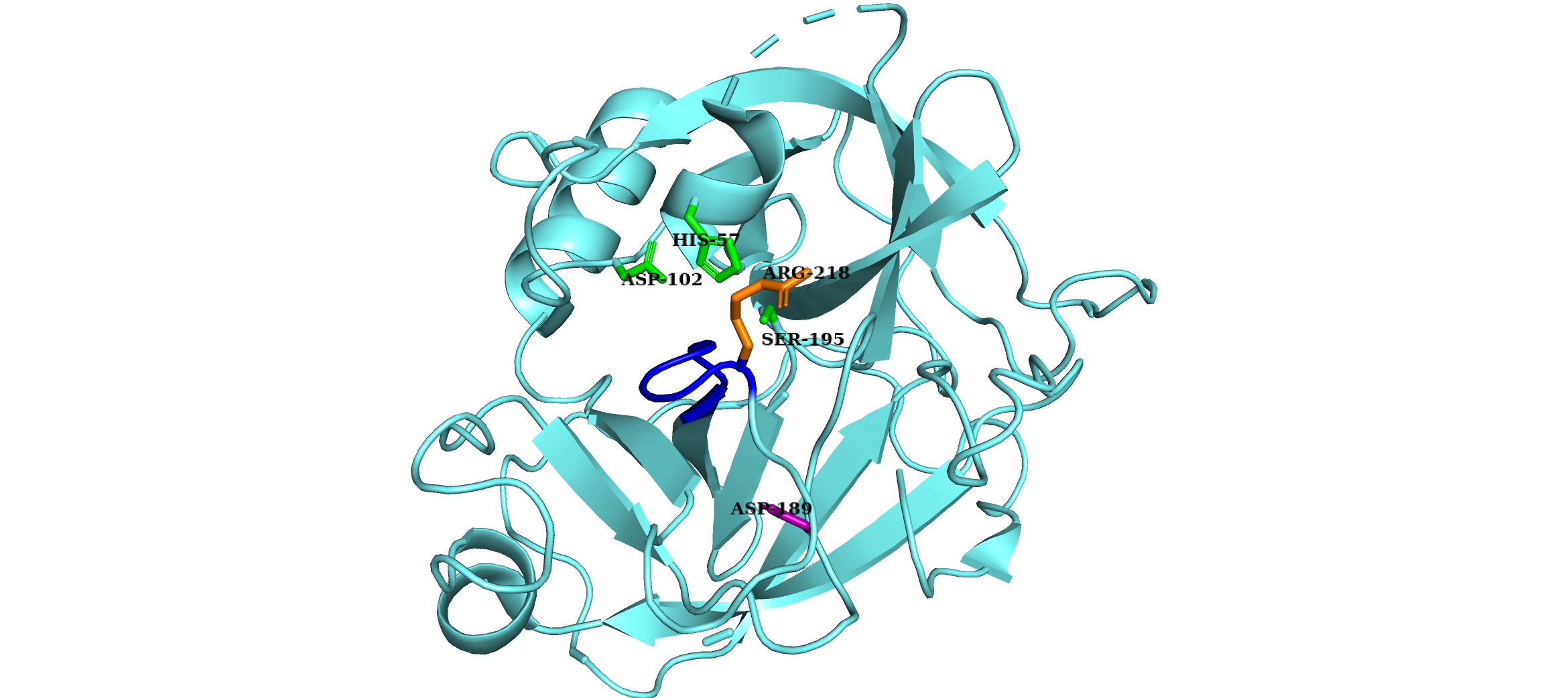
The canonical conformation of Factor D is not self-inhibited. The Asp-Arg salt bridge (purple and orange side chains, respectively) has been displaced resulting in a shift in the self inhibitory loop (blue). The catalytic triad is shown in green.

== Regulation ==
Factor D is synthesized by the liver and adipocytes with the latter being the major source. The pro-form of Factor D that is secreted is cleaved by MASP-3 to form the active sequence that circulates in the body. Factor D maintains an extremely high substrate specificity, and as a result has no known natural inhibitors in the body. However, most of Factor D remains in the self-inhibited form that limits substrate access to the catalytic site. Factor D has a molecular weight of 23.5 kD and is present at a concentration of 1.8 mg/L of blood in healthy humans. The synthesis rate of Factor is approximately 1.33 mg/kg/day, and most of Factor D is eliminated through the kidney after catabolism in proximal tubules after re-absorption. The net effect is a high fractional metabolic rate of 60% per hour. In patients with normal kidney function, no Factor D was detectable in urine. However, in patients with renal disease, Factor D was found at elevated levels. The alternative pathway is capable of operating even at low levels of Factor D, and deficiencies in levels of Factor D are rare.

== Role in diseases ==
A point mutation resulting in the replacement of a serine codon (Ser^{42} in the unprocessed methionine form of Factor D) with a stop codon (TAG) in the Factor D gene on chromosome 19 has been documented as a cause of Factor D deficiency. Deficiency in Factor D may cause an increased susceptibility to bacterial infections, specifically Neisseria infections. The mode of inheritance of Factor D deficiency is autosomal recessive, and individuals with a mutation on only one allele may not experience the same susceptibility to reoccurring infections. In a patient with reoccurring infections, complete improvement in the condition was obtained by introducing purified Factor D.

Diseases with excessive complement activation include paroxysmal nocturnal hemoglobinuria (PNH), and inhibitors of Factor D may have utility in the treatment of PNH. Small molecule inhibitors of Factor D are under development for the treatment of PNH, and one small molecule inhibitor, ACH-4471, has shown promise in a Phase 2 clinical trial for Factor D inhibition when combined with eculizumab. Patients treated with Factor D inhibitors must be immunized against infections in order to avoid reoccurring infections as in patients with Factor D deficiency.
