= Complement factor B =

Protein-coding gene in the species Homo sapiens

CFB
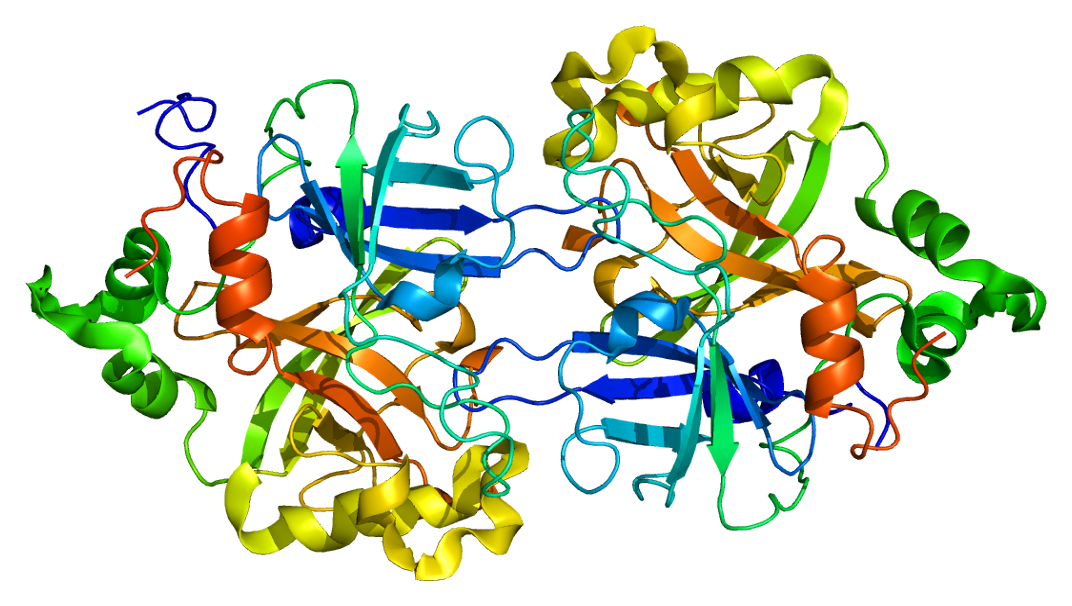

Identifiers
- Aliases: CFB, Cfb, AI195813, AI255840, Bf, C2, Fb, H2-Bf, AHUS4, ARMD14, BFD, CFAB, CFBD, FBI12, GBG, PBF2, complement factor B
- External IDs: OMIM: 138470; MGI: 105975; GeneCards: CFB
Available structures
PDB	Ortholog search: PDBe RCSB
PDB	List of PDB id codes 3HS0, 1DLE, 1Q0P, 1RRK, 1RS0, 1RTK, 2OK5, 2WIN, 2XWB, 2XWJ, 3HRZ
Enzyme activity
EC #	BRENDA	ExPASy	KEGG	MetaCyc
3.4.21.47	↗	↗	↗	↗

Gene location (Human)
Chr.	Chromosome 6 (human)
Band	6p21.33	Start	31,945,650 bp
Band	6p21.33	End	31,952,084 bp

Gene location (Mouse)
Chr.	Chromosome 17 (mouse)
Band	17 B1|17 18.41 cM	Start	35,075,350 bp
Band	17 B1|17 18.41 cM	End	35,081,494 bp
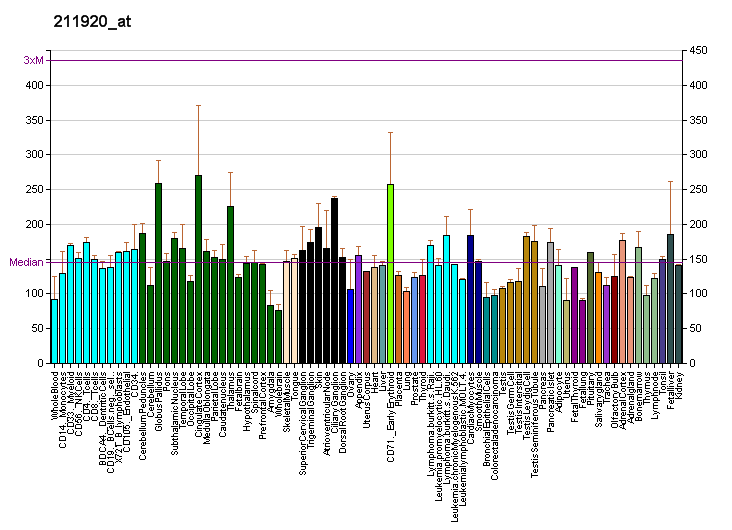

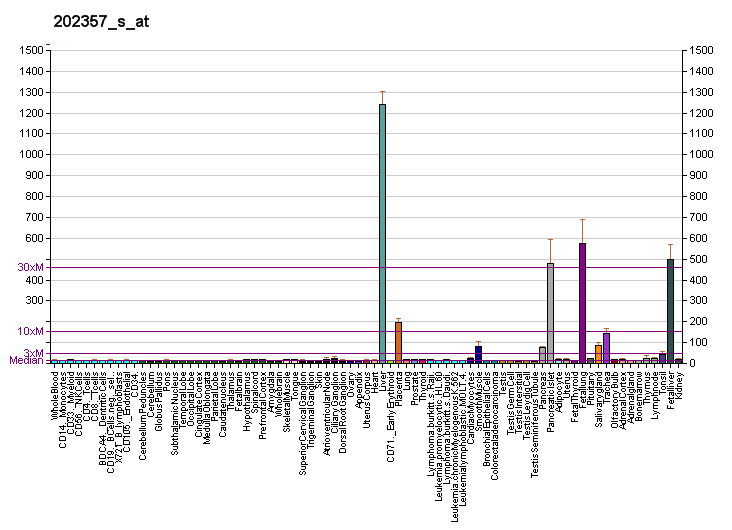
RNA expression pattern
Bgee	Human / Mouse (ortholog); Top expressed in: right lobe of liver; gallbladder; appendix; duodenum; islet of Langerhans; olfactory zone of nasal mucosa; Descending thoracic aorta; gastric mucosa; right coronary artery; human kidney / Top expressed in: proximal tubule; right kidney; human kidney; white adipose tissue; hepatobiliary system; liver; jejunum; ileum; colon; duodenum; More reference expression data
BioGPS	More reference expression data
Gene ontology
Molecular function	peptidase activity; serine-type peptidase activity; serine-type endopeptidase activity; hydrolase activity; complement binding; protein binding
Cellular component	extracellular region; plasma membrane; blood microparticle; extracellular exosome; extracellular space
Biological process	complement activation; regulation of complement activation; proteolysis; immune system process; complement activation, alternative pathway; innate immune response
Sources:Amigo / QuickGO
Orthologs
Databases	NCBI: entry; OMA: entry
Species	Human	Mouse
Entrez	629	14962
Ensembl	ENSG00000243570; ENSG00000239754; ENSG00000243649; ENSG00000241253; ENSG00000242335 ENSG00000241534; ENSG00000204359	ENSMUSG00000090231
UniProt	P00751	P04186
RefSeq (mRNA)	NM_001710	NM_001142706; NM_008198
RefSeq (protein)	NP_001701	NP_001136178; NP_032224; NP_001389804
Location (UCSC)	Chr 6: 31.95 – 31.95 Mb	Chr 17: 35.08 – 35.08 Mb
PubMed search
- Wikidata
View/Edit Human	View/Edit Mouse

Complement factor B is a protein that in humans is encoded by the CFB gene.

== Function ==
This gene encodes complement factor B, a component of the alternative pathway of complement activation. It is directly paralogous to complement component 2 (C2) of the classical pathway, occupying the same locus on Chromosome 6 (6p21.33) and sharing 39% sequence homology, with even greater functional homology due to conservative amino acid replacements accounting for 11% of the divergence. Both are serine proteases with directly analogous functions in their respective complement activation pathways.

Factor B circulates in the blood as a single chain polypeptide. Upon activation of the alternative pathway, it is cleaved by complement factor D yielding the noncatalytic chain Ba and the catalytic subunit Bb. The active subunit Bb harbors the serine protease domain that associates with C3b to form the alternative pathway C3 convertase. Bb is involved in the proliferation of preactivated B lymphocytes, while Ba inhibits their proliferation. This gene localizes to the major histocompatibility complex (MHC class III) region on chromosome 6. This cluster includes several genes involved in regulation of the immune reaction. The polyadenylation site of this gene is 421 bp from the 5' end of the gene for complement component 2.

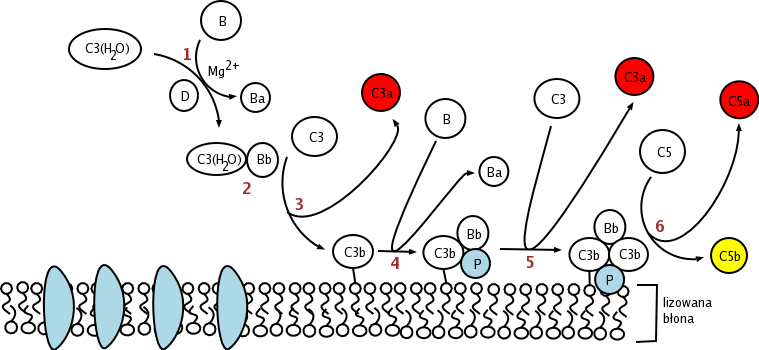
Alternative pathway. (Some labels are in Polish.)

Complement tests
C4 (C)	FB (A)	C3	CH50	Conditions
·	↓	↓	↓	PSG, C3 NeF AA
↓	·	↓	·	HAE, C4D
·	·	·	↓	TCPD
↓	·/↓	↓	↓	SLE
↑	↑	↑	↑	inflammation
