= CFHR5 =

Protein-coding gene in humans

Identifiers
- Aliases: CFHR5, CFHL5, CFHR5D, FHR-5, FHR5, complement factor H related 5
- External IDs: OMIM: 608593; GeneCards: CFHR5

Gene location (Human)
| Chr. | Chromosome 1 (human) |
| Band | 1q31.3 | Start | 196,977,556 bp |
| Band | 1q31.3 | End | 197,009,678 bp |
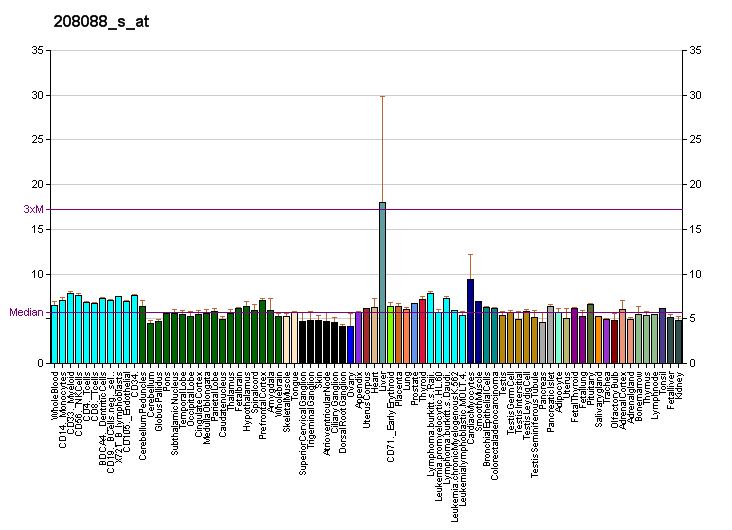
RNA expression pattern
| Bgee | Human / Mouse (ortholog); Top expressed in: right lobe of liver; testicle; gonad; kidney; blood; thoracic segment of trunk; structure with developmental contribution from neural crest; heart; atrium; intestine / n/a; More reference expression data |
| BioGPS | More reference expression data |
Gene ontology
| Molecular function | protein binding; protein homodimerization activity; protein heterodimerization activity |
| Cellular component | extracellular region; protein-containing complex |
| Biological process | complement activation, alternative pathway; regulation of complement activation; negative regulation of protein binding; positive regulation of cytolysis |
Sources:Amigo / QuickGO
Orthologs
| Databases | NCBI: entry; OMA: entry |
| Species | Human | Mouse |
| Entrez | 81494 | n/a |
| Ensembl | ENSG00000134389 | n/a |
| UniProt | Q9BXR6 | n/a |
| RefSeq (mRNA) | NM_030787 | n/a |
| RefSeq (protein) | NP_110414 | n/a |
| Location (UCSC) | Chr 1: 196.98 – 197.01 Mb | n/a |
| PubMed search | | n/a |
- Wikidata
| View/Edit Human |

Complement factor H-related protein 5 is a protein that in humans is encoded by the CFHR5 gene.

== Function ==
CFHR5 is structurally related to complement factor H which plays an important role in the regulation of a branch of the innate immune system called the alternative complement pathway. Like complement factor H, CFHR5 is able to bind to complement C3.

== Clinical significance ==
A mutation in CHFR5 was found in patients with the disease CFHR5 nephropathy, which is a common cause of renal disease in Cyprus. The mutated form of the protein found in patients with this disease has impaired ability to bind to complement C3, suggesting that CFHR5 is important in protecting the kidneys from attack by the complement system.
