= Complement component 1s =

Protein found in humans

C1S
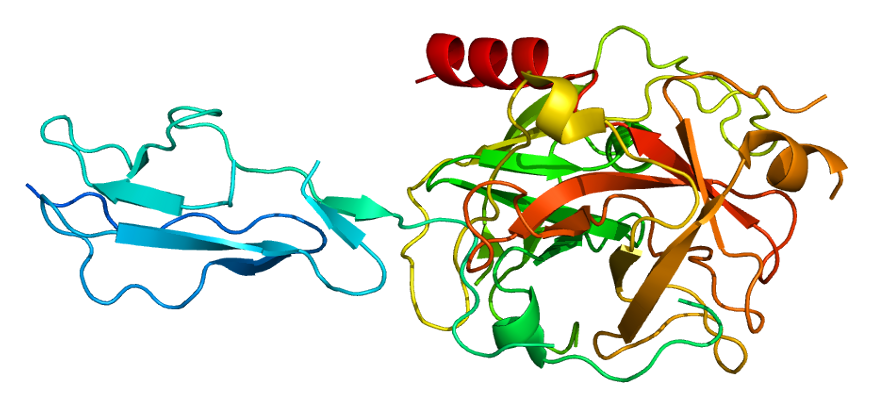

Identifiers
- Aliases: C1S, EDSPD2, complement C1s
- External IDs: OMIM: 120580; MGI: 3644269; GeneCards: C1S
Available structures
PDB	Ortholog search: PDBe RCSB
PDB	List of PDB id codes 1ELV, 1NZI, 4J1Y, 4LMF, 4LOR, 4LOS, 4LOT
Enzyme activity
EC #	BRENDA	ExPASy	KEGG	MetaCyc
3.4.21.42	↗	↗	↗	↗

Gene location (Human)
Chr.	Chromosome 12 (human)
Band	12p13.31	Start	6,988,259 bp
Band	12p13.31	End	7,071,032 bp

Gene location (Mouse)
Chr.	Chromosome 6 (mouse)
Band	6|6 F2	Start	124,601,584 bp
Band	6|6 F2	End	124,613,044 bp
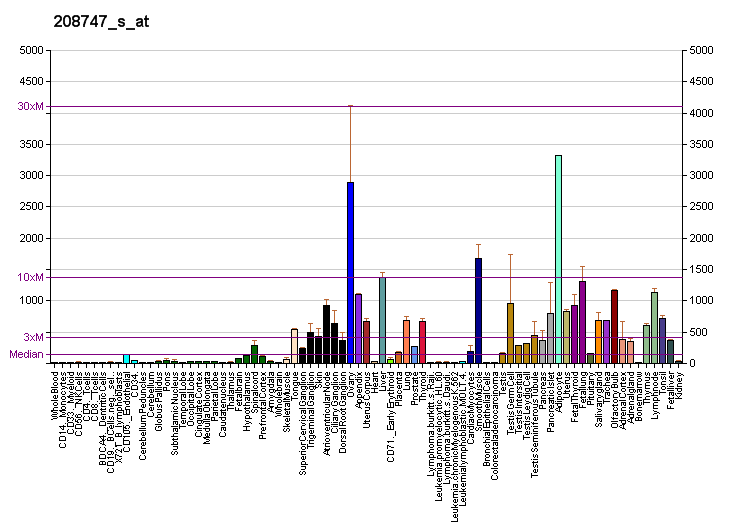
RNA expression pattern
Bgee	Human / Mouse (ortholog); Top expressed in: pericardium; right lobe of liver; parietal pleura; right ovary; gallbladder; left ovary; gastric mucosa; tibial nerve; left uterine tube; synovial joint / Top expressed in: muscle of thigh; morula; embryo; white adipose tissue; bone marrow; adrenal gland; urinary bladder; ovary; lens; islet of Langerhans; More reference expression data
BioGPS	More reference expression data
Gene ontology
Molecular function	calcium ion binding; peptidase activity; serine-type peptidase activity; protein binding; hydrolase activity; metal ion binding; identical protein binding; serine-type endopeptidase activity
Cellular component	blood microparticle; extracellular exosome; extracellular region; extracellular space
Biological process	proteolysis; complement activation, classical pathway; immune system process; innate immune response; complement activation, lectin pathway; complement activation; regulation of complement activation
Sources:Amigo / QuickGO
Orthologs
Databases	NCBI: entry; OMA: entry
Species	Human	Mouse
Entrez	716	317677
Ensembl	ENSG00000182326	ENSMUSG00000079343
UniProt	P09871	Q8CFG8
RefSeq (mRNA)	NM_001734; NM_201442; NM_001346850	NM_173864
RefSeq (protein)	NP_001333779; NP_001725; NP_958850	NP_776289
Location (UCSC)	Chr 12: 6.99 – 7.07 Mb	Chr 6: 124.6 – 124.61 Mb
PubMed search
- Wikidata
View/Edit Human	View/Edit Mouse

Complement component 1s (EC 3.4.21.42, C1 esterase, activated complement C1s, complement C overbar 1r, C1s) is a protein involved in the complement system. C1s is part of the C1 complex. In humans, it is encoded by the C1S gene.

C1s cleaves C4 and C2, which eventually leads to the production of the classical pathway C3-convertase.

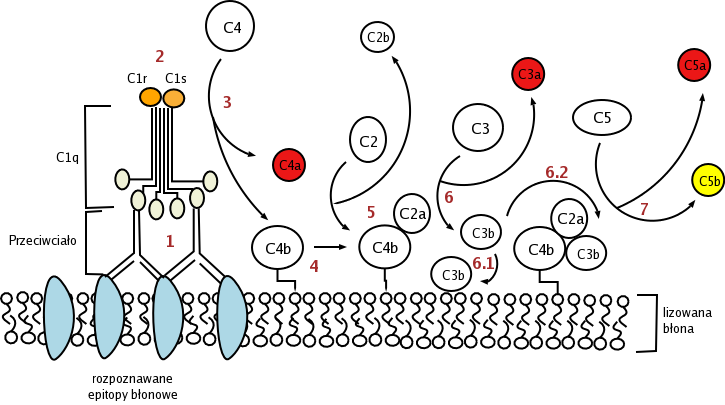
Classical pathway. (Some labels are in Polish.)

== See also ==
- C1q - another part of the C1 complex
- C1r - another part of the C1 complex
- MASP-2 - a protein similar to C1s, part of the lectin pathway
