= MBL deficiency =

Human disease

- Other names: Mannose-binding lectin deficiency
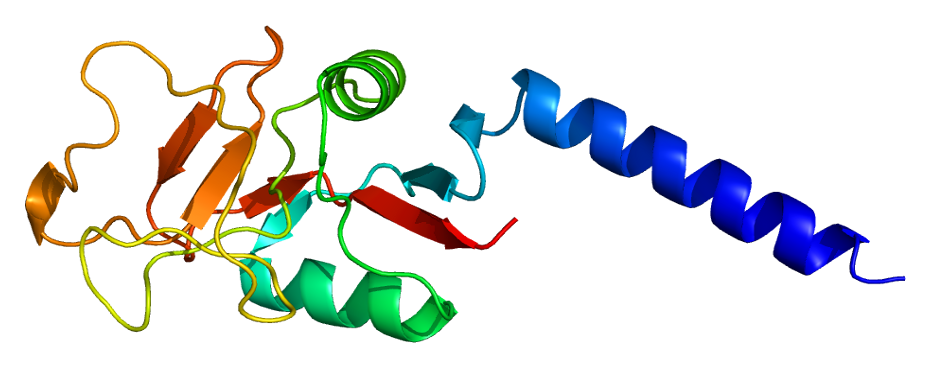
- Structure of the MBL2 protein.
- Specialty: Immunology

MBL deficiency or mannose-binding lectin deficiency is an illness that has an impact on immunity. Low levels of mannose-binding lectin, an immune system protein, are present in the blood of those who have this illness. It's unclear if this deficiency increases the risk of recurrent infections in those who are affected.

== Signs and symptoms ==
Specific infection susceptibility has been linked to low MBL levels. This is especially true when it comes to chronic illnesses like cystic fibrosis, chemotherapy-induced neutropenia, and weakened immunity, which are all present in the neonatal period. Moreover, septic shock and death have been connected to MBL deficiency.

== Causes ==
Mannose-binding lectin deficiency can result from mutations in the MBL2 gene.

== Mechanism ==
Mannose-binding lectin (MBL) is a soluble innate immune system pattern recognition molecule. MBL activates the complement lectin pathway by binding to glycoconjugates on the surface of a variety of clinically significant bacteria, viruses, and fungi that contain mannose, fucose, or N-acetylglucosamine. MBL stimulates leucocyte chemotaxis and activation as well as phagocytosis through complement activation. Additionally, MBL may contribute to the resolution of lung inflammation by apoptosis cell clearance and proinflammatory cytokine secretion suppression.

== Epidemiology ==
Depending on the definition of deficiency, MBL deficiency affects 10–30% of individuals, making it one of the most prevalent immune defects.
