= Complement component 1r =

Protein-coding gene in humans

C1R
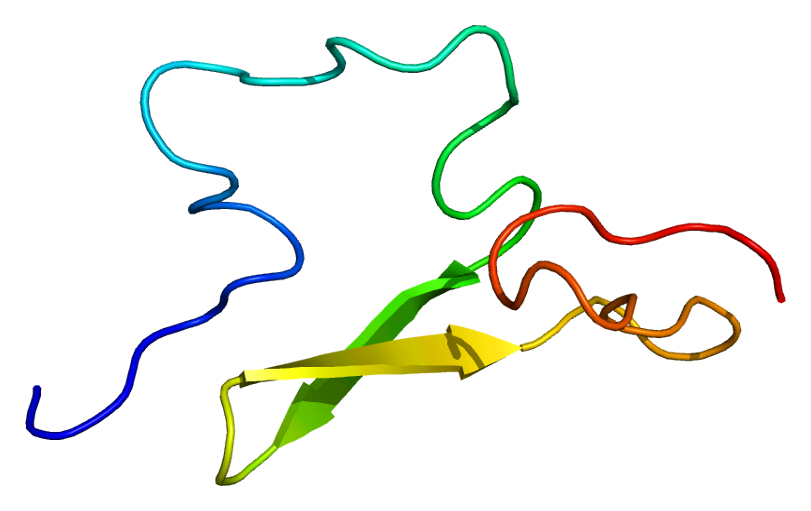

Identifiers
- Aliases: C1R, complement C1r, EDSPD1
- External IDs: OMIM: 613785; MGI: 3779804; GeneCards: C1R
Available structures
PDB	Ortholog search: PDBe RCSB
PDB	List of PDB id codes 1APQ, 1GPZ, 1MD7, 1MD8, 2QY0
Enzyme activity
EC #	BRENDA	ExPASy	KEGG	MetaCyc
3.4.21.41	↗	↗	↗	↗

Gene location (Human)
Chr.	Chromosome 12 (human)
Band	12p13.31	Start	7,080,214 bp
Band	12p13.31	End	7,092,540 bp

Gene location (Mouse)
Chr.	Chromosome 6 (mouse)
Band	6 F2|6	Start	124,547,253 bp
Band	6 F2|6	End	124,558,130 bp
RNA expression pattern
Bgee	Human / Mouse (ortholog); Top expressed in: right lobe of liver; right ovary; gallbladder; right coronary artery; gastric mucosa; left ovary; left uterine tube; left coronary artery; urinary bladder; canal of the cervix / Top expressed in: white adipose tissue; adrenal gland; muscle of thigh; urinary bladder; dentate gyrus of hippocampal formation granule cell; liver; ovary; skeletal muscle tissue; spleen; islet of Langerhans; More reference expression data
BioGPS	n/a
Gene ontology
Molecular function	peptidase activity; serine-type peptidase activity; serine-type endopeptidase activity; protein binding; hydrolase activity; calcium ion binding
Cellular component	extracellular region; blood microparticle; extracellular exosome; extracellular space
Biological process	immune response; proteolysis; complement activation, classical pathway; immune system process; innate immune response; complement activation; regulation of complement activation; zymogen activation
Sources:Amigo / QuickGO
Orthologs
Databases	NCBI: entry; OMA: entry
Species	Human	Mouse
Entrez	715	667277
Ensembl	ENSG00000159403; ENSG00000288512	ENSMUSG00000098470
UniProt	P00736	Q8CFG9
RefSeq (mRNA)	NM_001733; NM_001354346	NM_001113356
RefSeq (protein)	NP_001724; NP_001341275	NP_001106827
Location (UCSC)	Chr 12: 7.08 – 7.09 Mb	Chr 6: 124.55 – 124.56 Mb
PubMed search
- Wikidata
View/Edit Human	View/Edit Mouse

Complement C1r subcomponent (EC 3.4.21.41, activated complement C1r, C overbar 1r esterase, C1r) is a protein involved in the complement system of the innate immune system. In humans, C1r is encoded by the C1R gene.

C1r along with C1q and C1s form the C1 complex, which is the first component of the serum complement system. C1r is an enzyme that activates C1s to its active form, by proteolytic cleavage.

== Clinical significance ==
- Ehlers–Danlos syndrome Periodontal type is associated with mutations in the CR1 gene

== Function ==
C1r has been shown to interact with C1s. C1r cleaves C1s to form the active form of C1s.
