= Complement component 2 =

Protein found in humans

C2
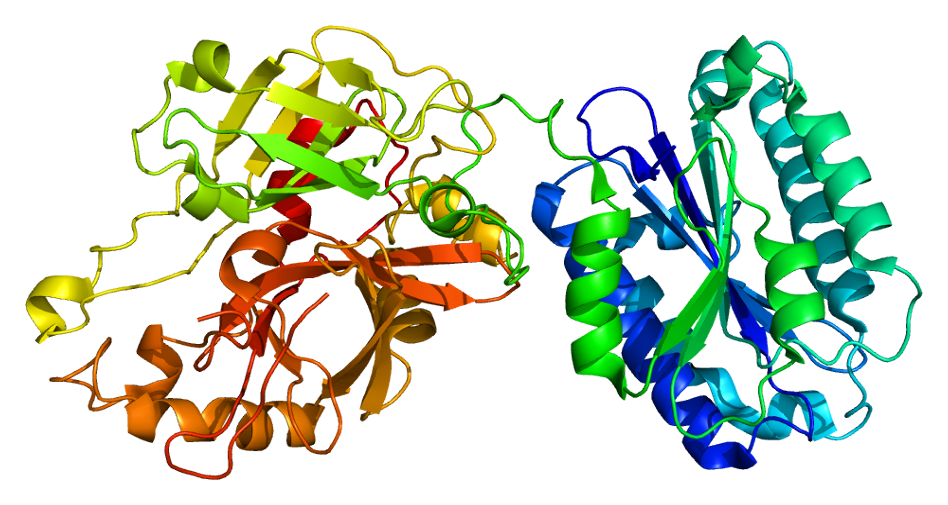

Identifiers
- Aliases: C2, ARMD14, CO2, complement component 2, complement C2
- External IDs: OMIM: 613927; MGI: 88226; GeneCards: C2
Available structures
PDB	Ortholog search: PDBe RCSB
PDB	List of PDB id codes 2I6S, 3ERB,%%s2ODQ
Enzyme activity
EC #	BRENDA	ExPASy	KEGG	MetaCyc
3.4.21.43	↗	↗	↗	↗

Gene location (Human)
Chr.	Chromosome 6 (human)
Band	6p21.33	Start	31,897,785 bp
Band	6p21.33	End	31,945,673 bp

Gene location (Mouse)
Chr.	Chromosome 17 (mouse)
Band	17 B1|17 18.41 cM	Start	35,081,580 bp
Band	17 B1|17 18.41 cM	End	35,117,241 bp
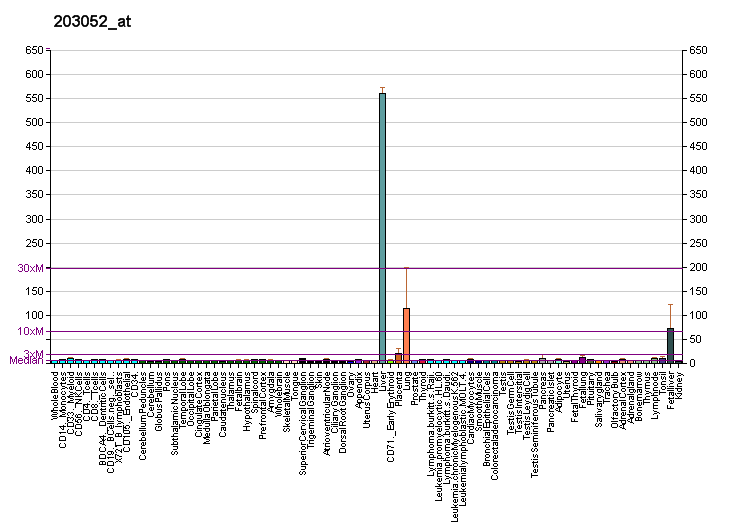
RNA expression pattern
Bgee	Human / Mouse (ortholog); Top expressed in: liver; right lobe of liver; placenta; spleen; upper lobe of left lung; gallbladder; appendix; right lung; lymph node; duodenum / Top expressed in: iris; decidua; adrenal gland; white adipose tissue; left lobe of liver; tunica adventitia of aorta; lumbar spinal ganglion; mesenteric lymph nodes; sciatic nerve; ileum; More reference expression data
BioGPS	More reference expression data
Gene ontology
Molecular function	peptidase activity; serine-type peptidase activity; hydrolase activity; metal ion binding; serine-type endopeptidase activity; protein binding
Cellular component	extracellular region; extracellular exosome; extracellular space
Biological process	complement activation; positive regulation of apoptotic cell clearance; regulation of complement activation; response to nutrient; proteolysis; complement activation, classical pathway; immune system process; innate immune response
Sources:Amigo / QuickGO
Orthologs
Databases	NCBI: entry; OMA: entry
Species	Human	Mouse
Entrez	717	12263
Ensembl	ENSG00000206372; ENSG00000235017; ENSG00000235696; ENSG00000226560; ENSG00000204364 ENSG00000166278; ENSG00000231543	ENSMUSG00000024371
UniProt	P06681; Q5JP69	P21180
RefSeq (mRNA)	NM_000063; NM_001145903; NM_001178063; NM_001282457; NM_001282458 NM_001282459	NM_013484
RefSeq (protein)	NP_000054; NP_001139375; NP_001171534; NP_001269386; NP_001269387 NP_001269388; NP_000054.2	NP_038512
Location (UCSC)	Chr 6: 31.9 – 31.95 Mb	Chr 17: 35.08 – 35.12 Mb
PubMed search
- Wikidata
View/Edit Human	View/Edit Mouse

Complement C2 is a protein that, in humans, is encoded by the C2 gene. The protein encoded by this gene is part of the classical pathway of the complement system, acting as a multi-domain serine protease, which are a class of enzymes that cleave peptide bonds in other proteins. Deficiency of C2 has been associated with certain autoimmune diseases.

The "Complement system" is generated to regulate self-protection from infection. Overall, the complement system is composed of protein groups that collaborate to destroy foreign invaders and subsequently clear debris from cells and tissues. When the body detects a foreign invader, the complement system becomes active.

This activation process involves the C2 protein attaching to the C4 (complement component 4) protein to form the complement system. C4 is a protein involved in autoimmunity, and when this protein attaches to C2, it triggers an immune response. The C4 protein's purpose is to connect recognition pathways for the antibody-antigen response, and the C2 protein regulates these processes.

== Function ==
In the classical and lectin pathways of complement activation, formation of the C3-convertase and C5-convertases requires binding of C2 to an activated surface-bound, C4b, in the presence of Mg^{2+}; the resultant C4bC2 complex is cleaved by C1s or MASP2 into C2a and C2b. It is thought that cleavage of C2 by C1s, while bound to C4b, results in a conformational rotation of C2b, whereas the released C2a fragment may retain most of its original structure.

C2b is the smallest enzymatically active fragment of C3 convertase in this pathway, C4b2b (NB: some sources now refer to the larger fragment of C2 as C2b, making the C3 convertase C4b2b, whereas older sources refer to the larger fragment of C2 as C2a, making the C3 convertase C4b2a). The smaller fragment, C2a (or C2b, depending on the source) is released into the fluid phase.

== Complement Component 2 Deficiency ==
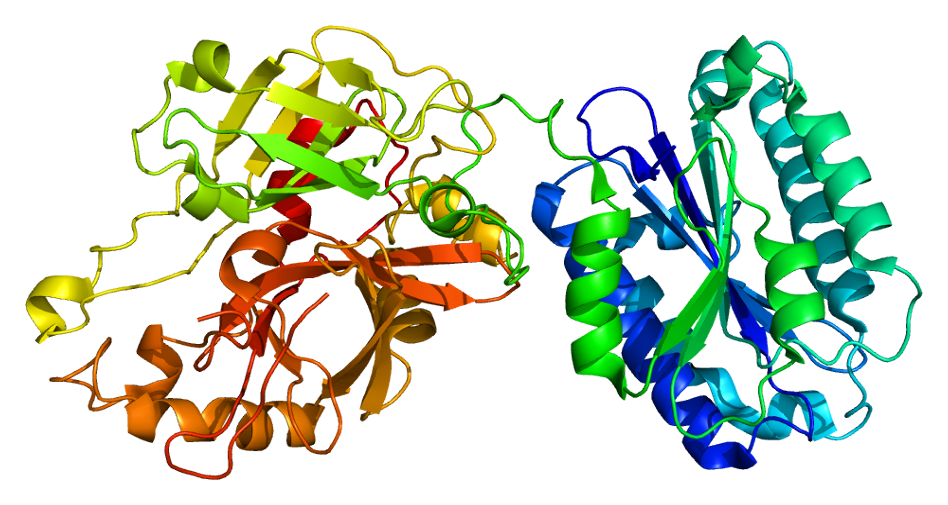
Complement C2 is a protein that in humans is encoded by the C2 gene.

Deficiency of C2 is a disorder that causes a major effect in the immune system, resulting in a form of immunodeficiency. This effect results in an inability to protect the body against any foreign invader. C2 deficiency is also connected with an increased risk of developing autoimmune disorders, such as systemic vasculitis. Complement deficiencies are a challenge to understand due to insufficient clinical trials. Using a hemolytic-plaque assay, RNA extraction, and blot analysis, it is fair to note that C2 deficiency is a result of pre-translational regulatory detection in the C2 gene expression. This causes a lack of synthesis within the C2 protein. This deficiency can be further understood by incorporating plasma protein deficiencies, especially those in tissue macrophages. It is also important to note that C2 deficiency can be caused by genetic and environmental factors. In genetic inheritance, autosomal recessive conditions are inherited with mutations in both copies of the gene, where parents of autosomal recessive condition typically do not show symptoms.

== Development of SLE ==
Complement component 2 deficiency is associated with an increased risk of developing autoimmune disorders, with females more likely to have SLE. Systemic lupus erythematosus (lupus) is a chronic autoimmune disease that causes inflammation and tissue damage, affecting many parts of the body. Lupus can range from mild to severe, and can cause inflammation in organs, such as the joints, skin, kidneys, and brain. The severity of the disorder varies. C2 is an important component of both the classical and lectin pathways of complement activation and is essential for first-line defense against microbial infection. It binds to MBL or ficolins to form the C3 convertase C4b2a. In C2 deficiency, C3 is not efficiently cleaved, leading to limited deposition of C3 fragments on immune complexes and apoptotic cells, leading to chronic activation of the complement system.

== Treatment and management ==
Complement deficiency is managed on a case-by-case basis with antibiotics and regular visits with an immunologist. One form of treatment for C2 deficiency includes replacing the missing component of the cascade, either through direct infusion of the protein or through gene therapy. Patients should be aware of the symptoms of meningococcal infection and receive routine vaccinations. Patients should seek accessible resources offered by their medical provider and take the necessary actions needed to treat complement deficiency.

=== Patient education ===
Patients and parents should be educated on the symptoms of serious illness and seek care immediately. Vaccination is an important preventive measure for the deficiency of C2. Early diagnosis, antibiotic prophylaxis, and vaccinations can help prevent life-threatening infections in hereditary C2 deficiency.

=== Promoting health care outcomes ===
The interprofessional team must be aware of the clinical features of patients with complement deficiency or immunodeficiency and refer them to allergist/immunologists when necessary. Infection prevention and treatment are key for complement deficiencies. Patient organizations build public awareness and support research to improve patients' lives. Patient organizations provide access to information, resources, and support.

== Clinical Significance ==
Photosensitive patients with C2 type I deficiency have a poor prognosis. C2 type I deficiency is caused by a 28-base pair gene deletion, resulting in a premature termination codon and a lack of C2 protein. Patients with LE associated with complement C4 or C2 deficiencies have a better prognosis than those without inherited deficiencies. C2 deficiency increases the risk of autoimmune disorders, which may be managed by receiving adequate care. Clinically, this is significant since C2 deficiency increases the risk of recurrent bacterial infections, which may be life-threatening.
