= Alternative complement pathway =

Type of cascade reaction of the complement system

The classical and alternative complement pathways.

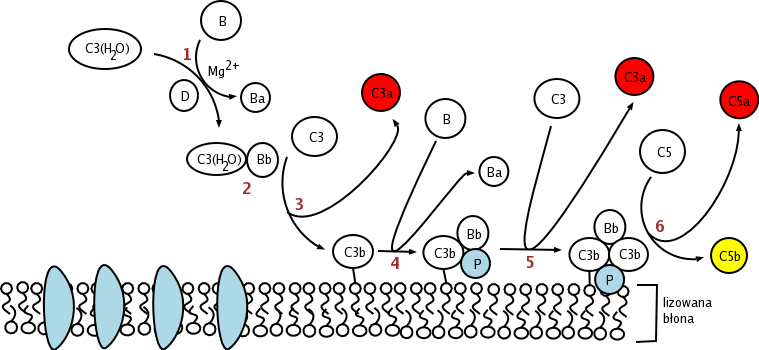
Alternative pathway. (Some labels are in Polish.)

The alternative pathway is a type of cascade reaction of the complement system and is a component of the innate immune system, a natural defense against infections.

The alternative pathway is one of three complement pathways that opsonize and kill pathogens. The pathway is triggered when the C3b protein directly binds a microbe. It can also be triggered by foreign materials and damaged tissues.

== Signaling cascade ==
This change in shape allows the binding of plasma protein Factor B, which allows Factor D to cleave Factor B into Ba and Bb.

Bb remains bound to C3(H_{2}O) to form C3(H_{2}O)Bb. This complex is also known as a fluid-phase C3-convertase. This convertase, the alternative pathway C3-convertase, although only produced in small amounts, can cleave multiple C3 proteins into C3a and C3b. The complex is believed to be unstable until it binds properdin, a serum protein. The addition of properdin forms the complex C3bBbP, a stable compound which can bind an additional C3b to form alternative pathway C5-convertase.

The C5-convertase of the alternative pathway consists of (C3b)_{2}BbP (sometimes referred to as C3b_{2}Bb). After the creation of C5 convertase (either as (C3b)_{2}BbP or C4b2a3b from the classical pathway), the complement system follows the same path regardless of the means of activation (alternative, classical, or lectin). C5-convertase cleaves C5 into C5a and C5b. C5b binds sequentially to C6, C7, C8 and then to multiple molecules of C9 to form membrane attack complex.

== Regulation ==
Since C3b is free and abundant in the plasma, it can bind to either a host cell or a pathogen surface. To prevent complement activation from proceeding on the host cell, there are several different kinds of regulatory proteins that disrupt the complement activation process:

- Complement Receptor 1 (CR1 or CD35) and DAF (decay accelerating factor also known as CD55) compete with Factor B in binding with C3b on the cell surface and can even remove Bb from an already formed C3bBb complex
- The formation of a C3 convertase can also be prevented when a plasma protease called complement factor I cleaves C3b into its inactive form, iC3b. Factor I requires a C3b-binding protein cofactor such as complement factor H, CR1, or membrane cofactor of proteolysis (MCP or CD46)
- Complement factor H can inhibit the formation of the C3 convertase by competing with factor B for binding to C3b; accelerate the decay of the C3 convertase; and act as a cofactor for factor I-mediated cleavage of C3b. Complement factor H preferentially binds to vertebrate cells (because of affinity for sialic acid residues), allowing preferential protection of host (as opposed to bacterial) cells from complement-mediated damage.
- CFHR5 (Complement factor H-Related protein 5) is able to bind to act as a cofactor for factor I, has decay accelerating activity and is able to bind preferentially to C3b at host surfaces.

== Role in disease ==
Dysregulation of the complement system has been implicated in several diseases and pathologies, including atypical hemolytic uremic syndrome in which kidney function is compromised. Age related macular degeneration (AMD) is now believed to be caused, at least in part, by complement overactivation in retinal tissues. Alternative pathway activation also plays a significant role in complement-mediated renal disorders such as atypical hemolytic uremic syndrome, C3 glomerulopathy, and C3 glomerulonephritis (Dense Deposit Disease or MPGN Type II).

== See also ==
- Classical complement pathway
- Lectin pathway
