= Classical complement pathway =

Aspect of the immune system

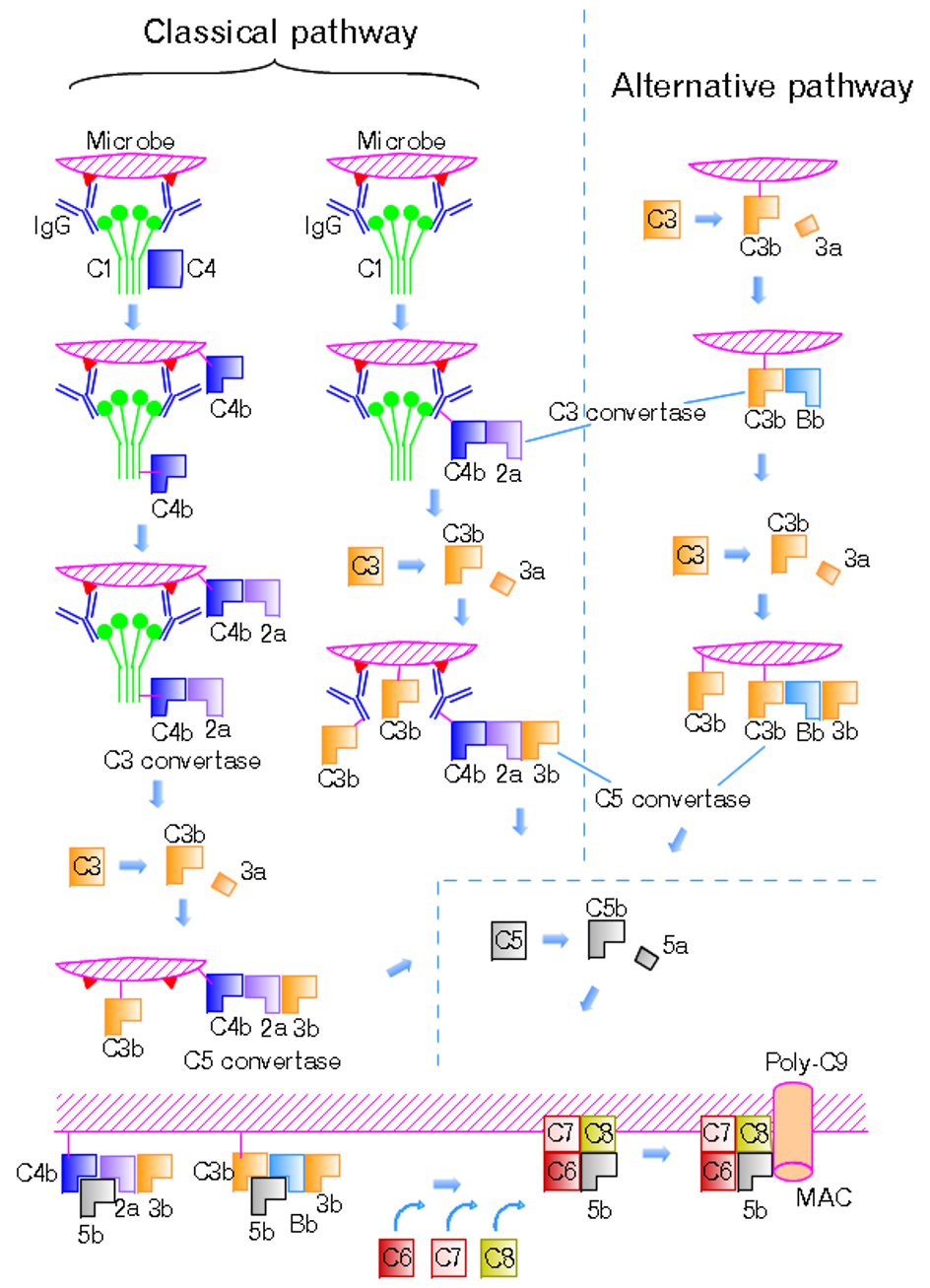
Classical and alternative pathways shown with their corresponding proteins

The classical complement pathway is one of three pathways which activate the complement system, which is part of the immune system. The classical complement pathway is initiated by antigen-antibody complexes with the antibody isotypes IgG and IgM.

Following activation, a series of proteins are recruited to generate C3 convertase (C4b2b, historically referred C4b2a), which cleaves the C3 protein. The C3b component of the cleaved C3 binds to C3 convertase (C4b2b) to generate C5 convertase (C4b2b3b), which cleaves the C5 protein. The cleaved products attract phagocytes to the site of infection and tags target cells for elimination by phagocytosis. In addition, the C5 convertase initiates the terminal phase of the complement system, leading to the assembly of the membrane attack complex (MAC). The membrane attack complex creates a pore on the target cell's membrane, inducing cell lysis and death.

The classical complement pathway can also be activated by apoptotic cells, necrotic cells, and acute phase proteins.

== Complement cascade ==
The classical complement pathway leading into a complement cascade that is shared with the alternative pathway.

The classical pathway is distinct from the other complement pathways in its unique activation triggers and cascade sequence. Activation of the complement pathway through the classical, lectin or alternative complement pathway is followed by a cascade of reactions eventually leading to the membrane attack complex.

=== Initiation ===
The classical complement pathway can be initiated by the binding of antigen-antibody complexes to the C1q protein. The globular regions of C1q recognize and bind to the Fc region of antibody isotypes IgG or IgM. These globular regions of C1q can also bind to bacterial and viral surface proteins, apoptotic cells, and acute phase proteins. In the absence of these activation factors, C1q is part of the inactive C1 complex which consists of six molecules of C1q, two molecules of C1r, and two molecules of C1s.

=== Formation of C4b convertase ===
The binding of C1q with pathogen surface or antigen-antibody immune complex leads to conformational changes and the activation of the serine protease C1r. The activated C1r then cleaves and activates the serine protease C1s. Activated C1s cleaves C4 into C4a and C4b.

=== Regulation of C4b ===
The newly formed C4b cannot stay activated as a highly reactive thioester bond is revealed once C4 has been cleaved. The thioester bond is cleaved by water resulting in its cleavage permanently deactivating the C4b molecule. As a result of this C4b is restricted to only bind to pathogen surfaces. They would undergo rapid deactivation in the time it took to travel from the origin of activation where C1q is complexed with an antigen-antibody immune complex(IC) or where C1q is directly attached to the pathogens surface.

=== Formation of C3-convertase. ===
Surface-bound C4b acts as a receptor for the binding of C2. The binding of C2 and C4b results in C2 being cleaved by C1s into C2a and C2b. C2b diffuses into the plasma as a protein inflammatory mediator while C2a remains attached with C4b, forming the C3-convertase (C4b2a). The function of the membrane-bound C3-convertase is the cleavage of many many molecules of C3 into C3a and C3b. C3a is a smaller fragment of C3 is a potent inflammatory mediator.

=== C3b function and structure. ===
C3b can act as an opsonin. C3b is very similar to C4 in both structure and function also has a thioester bond that forces it to attach to surface nucleophile of the activator(namely the pathogen or IC). Phagocytes have receptors for C3b and as a result of receptor-ligand binding are able to more easily recognize and engulf pathogen molecules. While the anaphylatoxin C3a interacts with its C3a receptor (C3aR) to recruit leukocytes, C3b contributes to further downstream complement activation.

=== Formation of C5 convertase and MAC ===
C3b binds to the C3 convertase (C4b2a), to form C5 convertase (C4b2a3b). C5 convertase then cleaves C5 into C5a and C5b. Like C3a, C5a is also an anaphylatoxin that interacts with its cognate C5a receptor (C5aR) to attract leukocytes. Subsequent interactions between C5b and other terminal components C6, C7, C8, and C9 form the membrane attack complex or the C5b-9 complex which forms pores on the target cell membranes to lysing.

== Clinical significance ==
Because of its role in the innate immune system classical complement has been implicated in a number of pathogen related disorders. Complement is responsible for immune inflammatory response in adipose tissues which has been implicated in the development of obesity. Obesity in turn results in an abnormally high level of complement activation via production of the C1 component of the classical pathway, which can lead to tissue inflammation and eventually insulin resistance, however the exact mechanisms that causes this is yet unknown.

Immunotherapies have been developed to detect and destroy cells infected by the HIV virus via classical complement activation. This process involves creating synthetic peptides that target conserved regions in HIV specific proteins and induce an antibody specific immune response through IgG antibodies. This is important for targeting the virus in its intracellular phase because the antibodies specific to the synthetic peptides can trigger the classical complement pathway and induce the death of HIV infected cells.

Classical complement activation has also been shown to combat Methicillin-resistant Staphylococcus aureus. Certain variants of the IgM antibody were found to bind the Methicillin-resistant Staphylococcus aureus these IgM were found to be critical in complement activation through the classical pathway and subsequent destruction of the bacteria. Therapies that utilize classical complement activation have been shown to be effective in targeting and killing cancer cells and destroying tumors. Tachyplesin, a small peptide, has been shown to exhibit these effects. When injected into target tissue encourages recruitment of C1q and activates downstream events, eventually leading to the formation of the C5b-9 complex which damages tumor cells, killing them.

Lack of regulation of the classical complement pathway through the deficiency in C1-inhibitor results in episodic angioedema. C1-inhibitor defiency can be hereditary or acquired, resulting in hereditary or acquired angioedema. C1-inhibitor plays the role of inactivating C1r and C1s to prevent further downstream classical complement activity. C1-inhibitor controls the processes involved in maintaining vascular permeability. As a result, C1-inhibitor levels of less than 50% of the standard lead to increased vascular permeability, characteristic of angioedema. Cinryze, a human plasma derived C1-esterase inhibitor, has been approved for use in 2008 for the prevention of hereditary angioedema attacks.

Deficiency in the C1q protein of the classical complement pathway can lead to development of systemic lupus erythematosus. Among the many functions of C1q, C1q triggers clearance of immune complexes and apoptotic cells by activating the classical pathway and binding directly onto phagocytes. Consequently, systemic lupus erythematosus from insufficient amounts of C1q is characterized by the accumulation of autoantibodies and apoptotic cells. Studies are being done to look into antibodies against C1q as a diagnostic marker for systemic lupus erythematosus.

== See also ==
- Alternative complement pathway
- Lectin pathway
