= Os renovadores =

1920s group of artists who wanted to renew the visual Galician arts

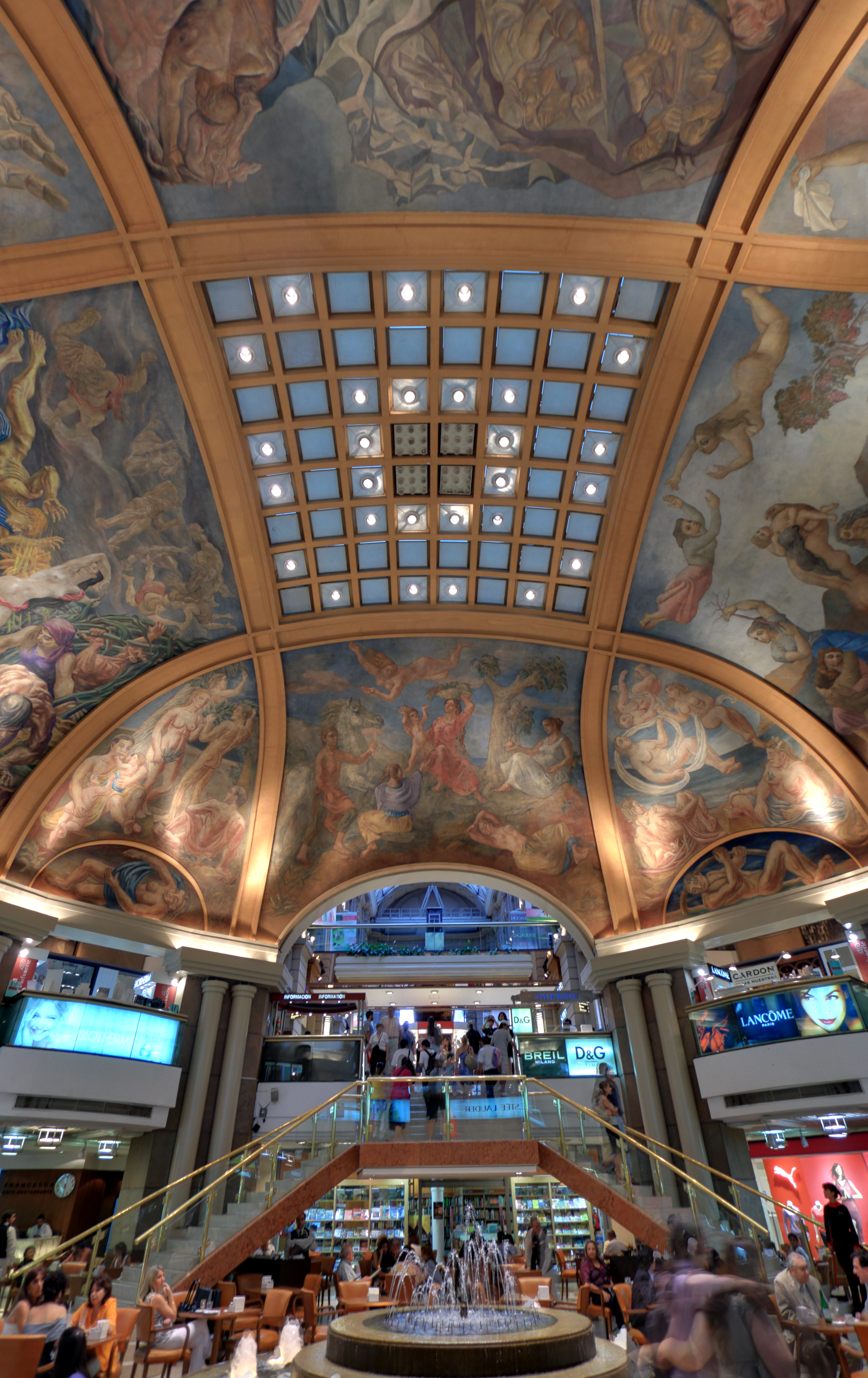
- Mural by Manuel Colmeiro at Galerías Pacífico in Buenos Aires
- Nickname: Os novos (The new ones); Os renovadores (The renewers)
- Predecessor: Galician art of 19th century
- Formation: 1920s
- Founded at: Galicia
- Region served: Galicia and the exile in Iberoamerica

Os Renovadores (the Renewers) or Os Novos (New ones) was a group of artists who wanted to renew the visual Galician arts during the 1920s.

== Artists ==
It was a diverse movement. Maside, Souto, Colmeiro, Seoane, Eiroa, Mazas, Torres, Laxeiro and others, are considered members of the group. José Frau is sometimes named, as is Virxilio Blanco, who went to Cuba at a young age. For their support and influence, it is also common to include Castelao, Camilo Díaz and Asorey. Some others were Urbano Lugrís, María Antonia Dans, student of Lolita Díaz (first woman member of Real Academia Galega de Belas Artes) with Elena Gago; and Ángel Johán, Colombo, Cebreiro, Pesqueira, Concheiro, Bonome, etc. or the surrealists Granell and Mallo. Isaac Díaz Pardo, after the murder of his father Camilo Díaz, continued the legacy of his family of artists, and renewed the forms of design and ceramics.

== Precursors ==
Since the Séculos Escuros (Dark Centuries), efforts to maintain the dignity of Galician culture were made in Arts (like Compostelan Baroque), Science and Education (with Martin Sarmiento and Benito J. Feijoo), and in Literature (as recent discoveries show).

In the 19th century, some events led to a resurgence (Rexurdimento), especially in poetry. In plastic arts, like in painting, there is an affinity for romantic and post-impressionist landscapes influenced by Cézanne. Among them there is a regionalist feeling for their landscapes, and some Galicians, like Valle-Inclán, accused the artistic primacy of the Madrid – Valencia axis inside Iberian Peninsule. Some of the most Galician promising artists died young and were called 'the Sick Generation'.

=== Precursor's gallery of images ===
O divino sainete, cover by Álvarez. In PDF.

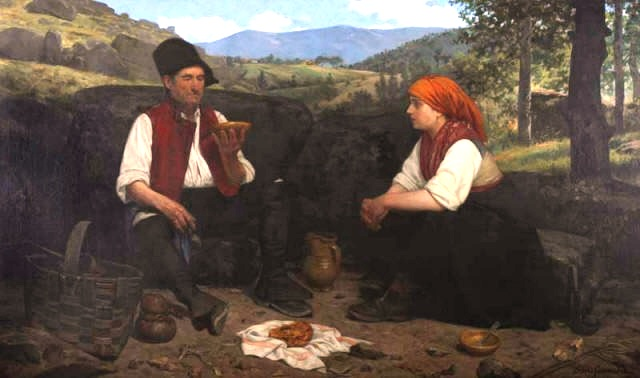
O xantar, by Silvio Rodríguez, from 'landscape regionalism'.

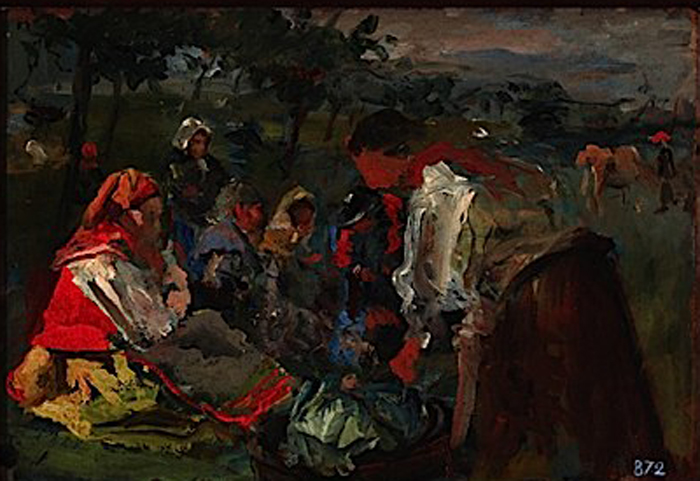
Escena de romaría, de Xenaro Carrero, member of the 'Sick Generation'.

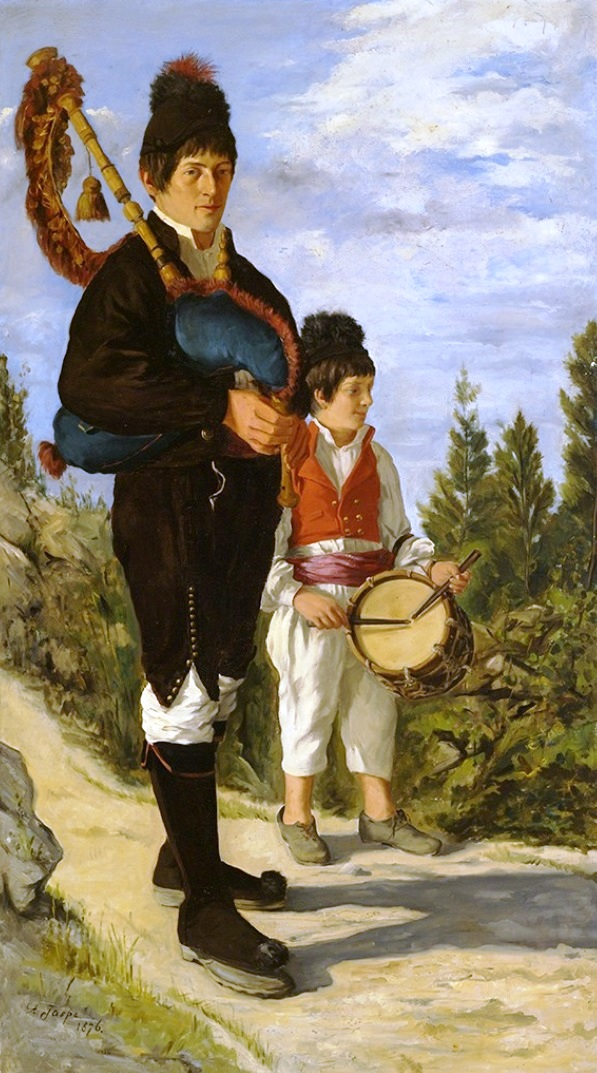
O gaiteiro ('The piper'), by Jaspe Moscoso. Museo de Belas Artes da Coruña.

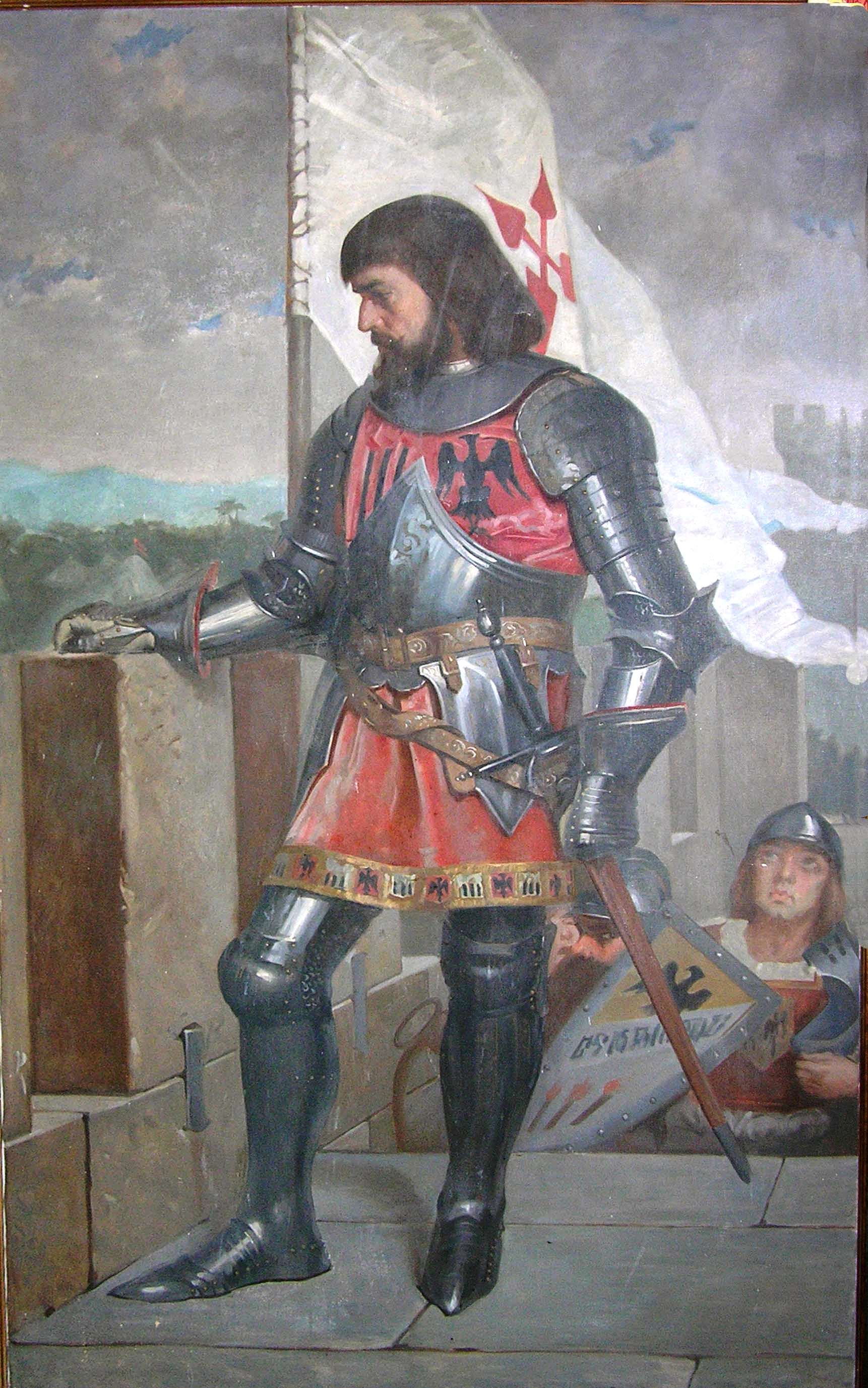
Pardo de Cela by Manuel Álvarez. With the codes of the time, Álvarez reflected some of the founding myths of XIX regionalism.

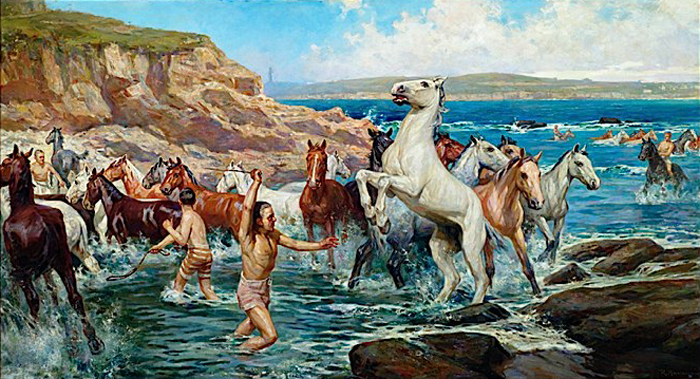
Banho de cavalos ('Horse's bath) by Román Navarro, in Museo de Belas Artes da Corunha.

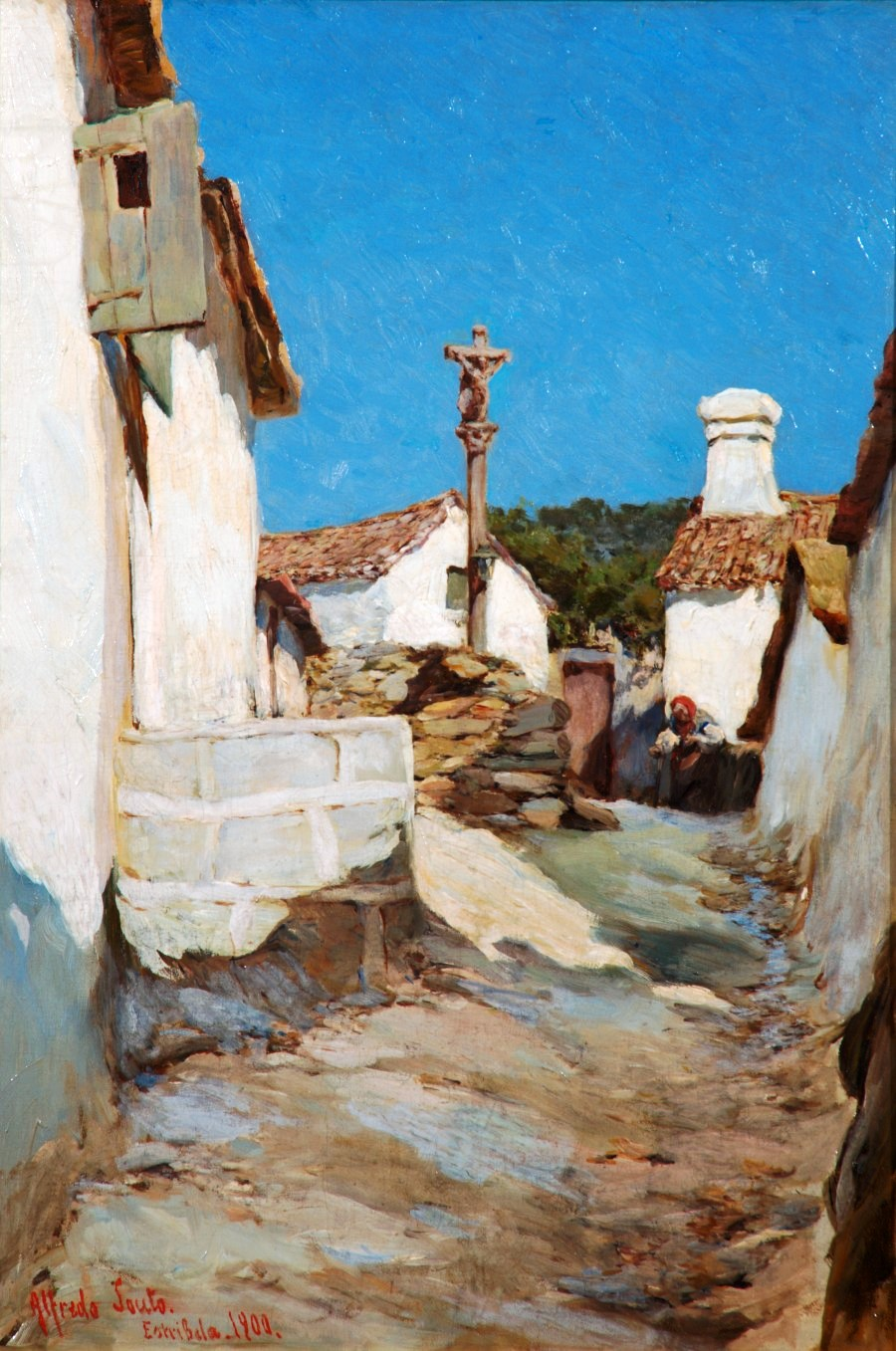
Estribela, by Alfredo Souto.

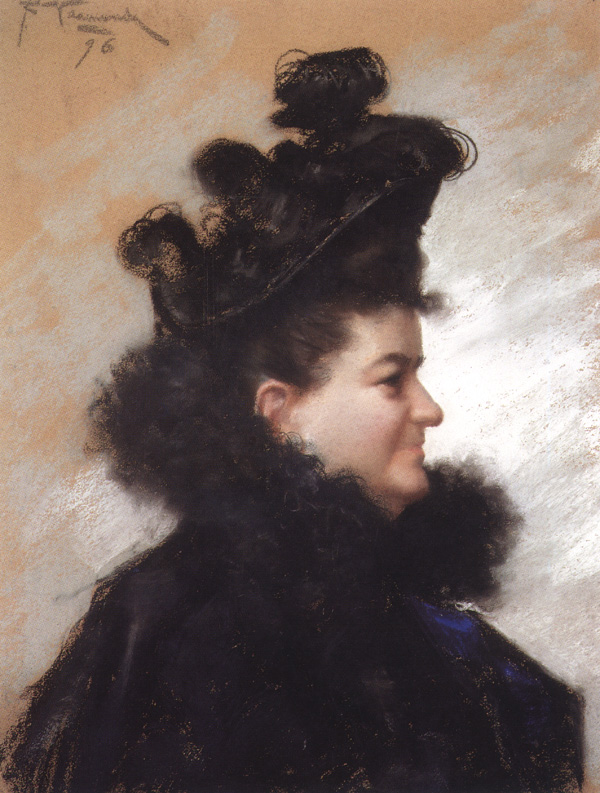
Retrato de Emilia Pardo Bazán, by Vaamonde Cornide.

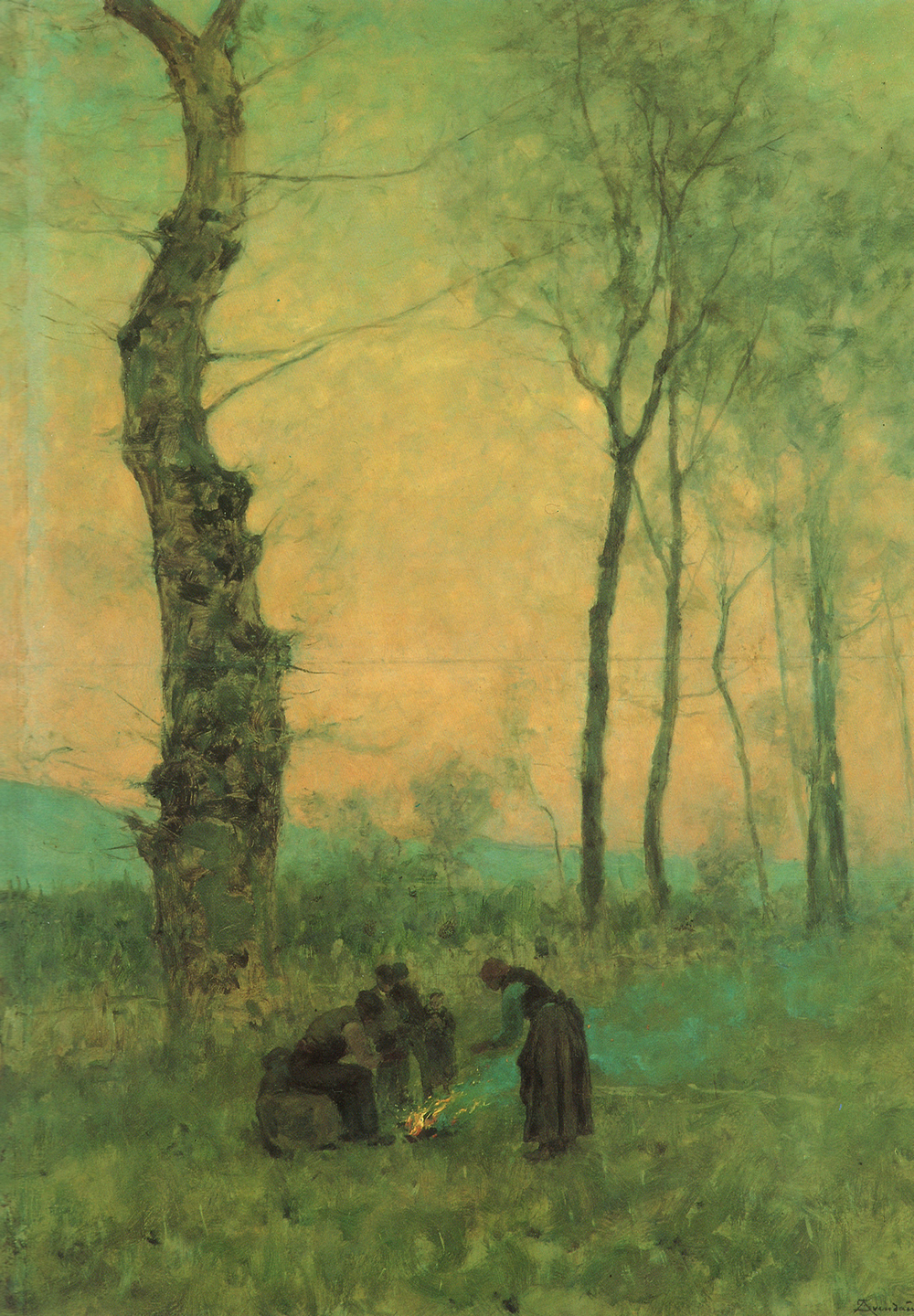
Paisaxe de inverno by Serafín Avendaño. (Note: Avendaño painted scenes in Galicia, Portugal and Italy, where he became a friend of Verdi.)

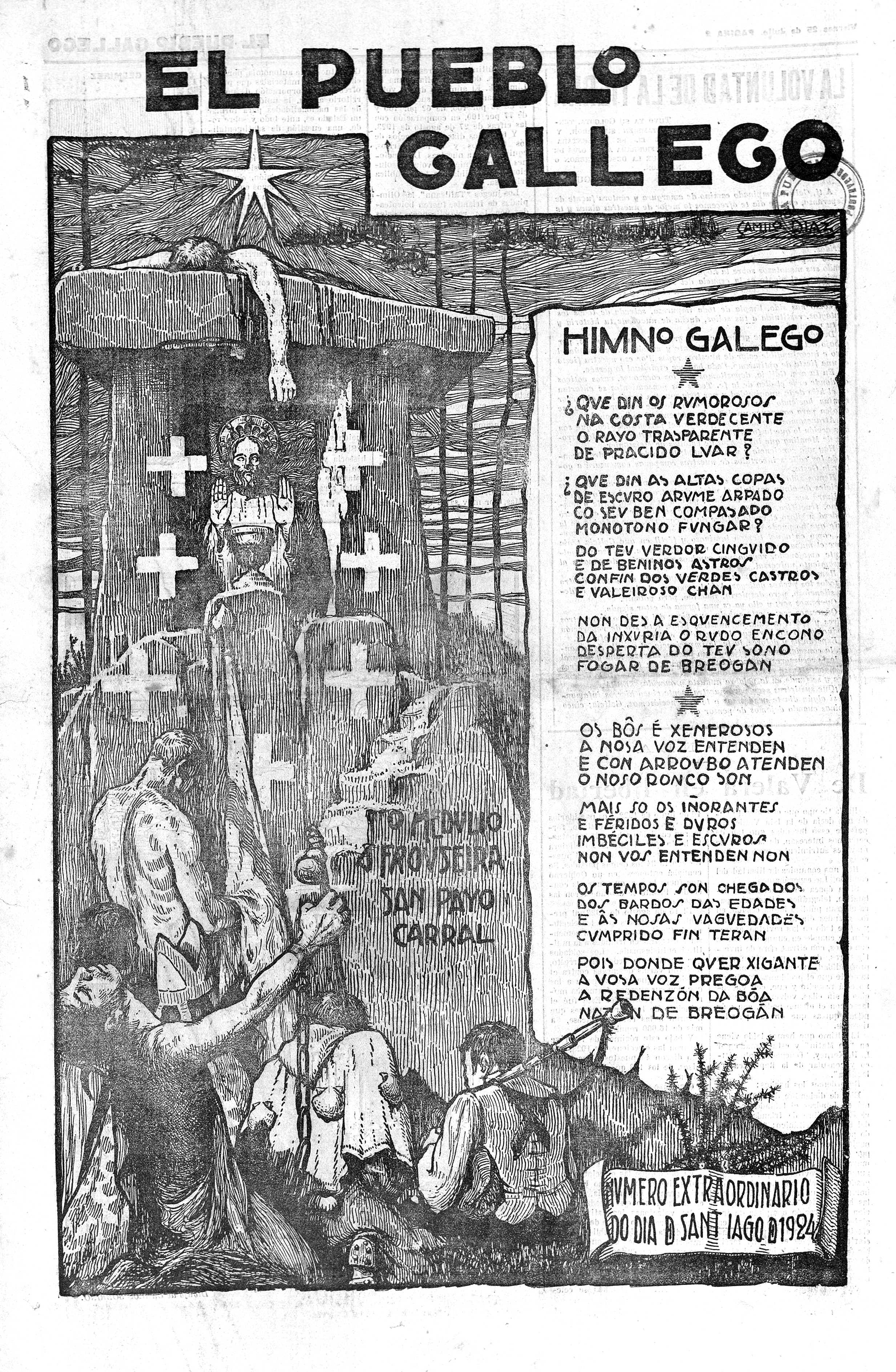
Camilo Díaz cover of El Pueblo Gallego magazine

== Vanguards ==
In Europe, the vanguards appeared strongly. Some Spaniard artists, specially from Catalonia, went to France (Picasso, Miró, Dalí...). In the 1920s, the Xeración Nós wanted to link Galician and other European cultures, and the 'Generation of 25' emerges (the "renovators" of Galician poetry and theater).

Plastic artists born in the first decade of the century don't break with older artists, such as Díaz Baliño, Castelao or Asorey, but they try to value, renew and democratize Galician tradition. Writers and plastic artists gather around El Pueblo Gallego, which begins to publish graphic and written works in Spanish and Galician.

In 1921, Santiago Ramón y Cajal awarded Daniel Castelao a scholarship to learn about the avant-garde in Europe. He spent almost one year traveling and he published fragments of his travel diary in the magazine Nós:

Spanish people think that to be universal (...) we who make national art (of the Galician nation) are asked to 'kill the regional spirit' and be Spanish; now I ask: if you realize that art has no borders, it means that it is cosmopolitan. Why don't you ask us to 'kill the Spanish spirit'? Well then, if Spanish art can come out of Spain, so can Galician, Basque and Catalan art.

For him, art must be universal and cosmopolitan, but linked to the 'mother culture'. When he got in touch with the avant-garde art of Central Europe, he made some disqualifying comments about Picasso, who after his training in Galicia and Catalonia was developing Cubism in Paris. He preferred the Russian vanguards because they were "linked to the people". Later, he published an essay on Cubism, in which he became interested in its structuring of painting and reality, saying that the avant-garde could be "crazy, but not silly", and corresponds with his countryman of Rianxo, the poet Manuel Antonio, searching to renew art and seeking in its roots.

Poem From four to four, in PDF. In one of its editions it was illustrated by Carlos Maside

Carlos Maside was one of the group who traveled the most. His work was shown in the US by the Carnegie Institute, along with M. Mallo and A. Souto. In Paris, he saw works by Gauguin and Van Gogh, which influenced his work beyond the Cubists, Magic realism, and Expressionism, and the writings of Bauhaus professor Kandinsky. He also made graphic works for the Statute of Autonomy campaign. He helped form the Art Collection for the Seminar on Galician Studies, and suggested creating an Art Library to the City Council of Santiago. Unlike other artists who left their country, he stayed in inner exile. In Vigo, he made friends with younger artists like his nephew Xulio and Laxeiro.

Manuel Colmeiro was another artist who traveled a lot, which gave him both academic and self-taught training. After the war, he went into exile in Argentina, where he created murals in Galerías Pacífico. In exile, he interacted with artists like Seoane, Rafael Dieste, and Rafael Alberti. He moved to Paris in 1949 and in 1989 he returned to Galicia. In the 60s, he had exhibitions in London and won several awards and recognitions in the 80s. He died in Salvaterra de Minho in 1999 at the age of 98. His daughter Elena Colmeiro was also an artist, specializing in sculpture and ceramics.

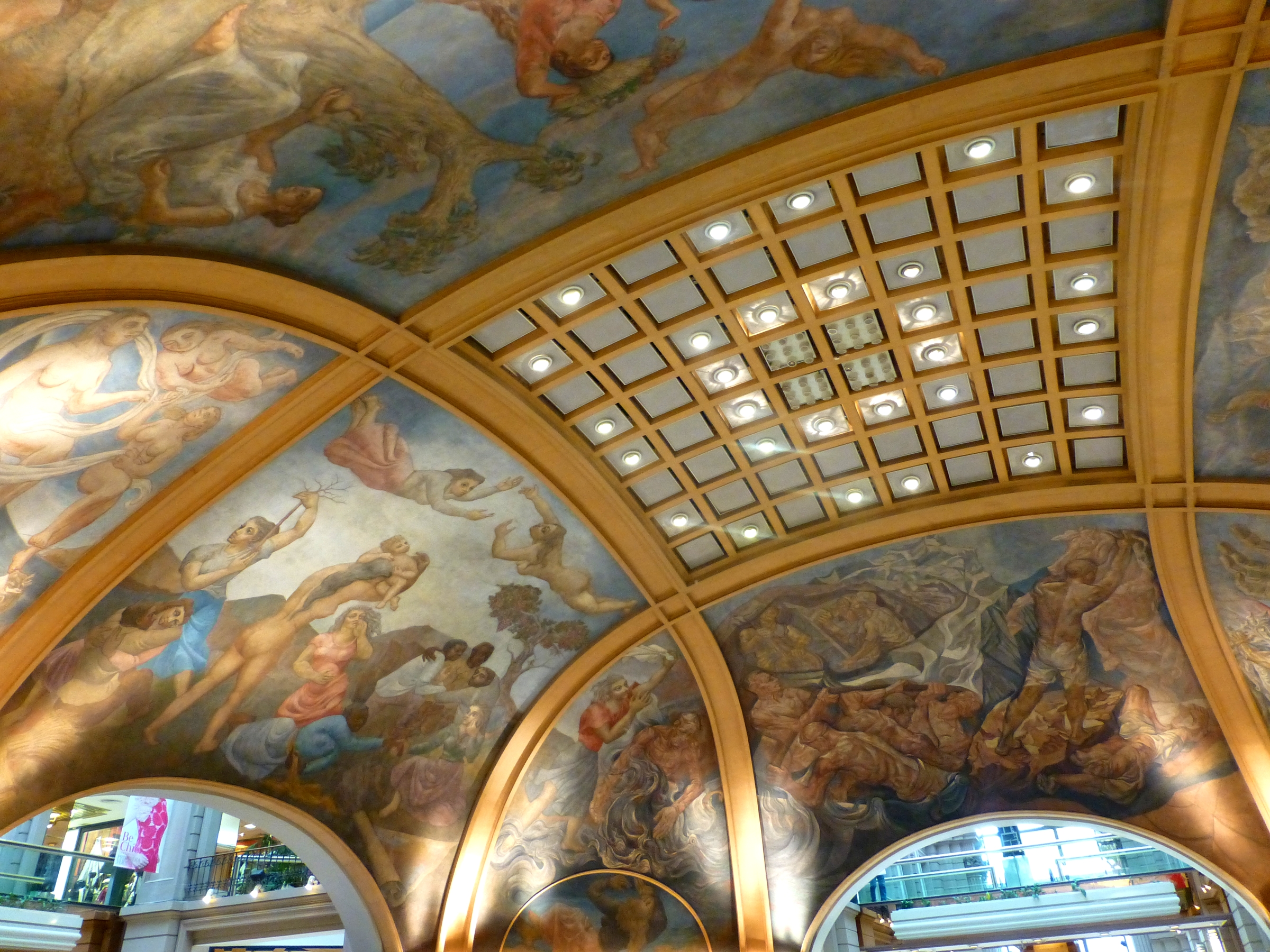
Colmeiro Murals at Galerías Pacífico. 1.

Seoane talked to Freixanes about the concerns of students in Compostela during the first third of the 20th century:

The currents of "simplicismus" worried and interested a lot, within the "art nouveau". The European artistic and intellectual center began to move from Paris to Berlin both in painting and the visual arts as well as in philosophical and political thought (...) Austria was also very present, Paul Klee, Grosz... All of this, although it may seem curious, it was known in the restless Galicia of those years.

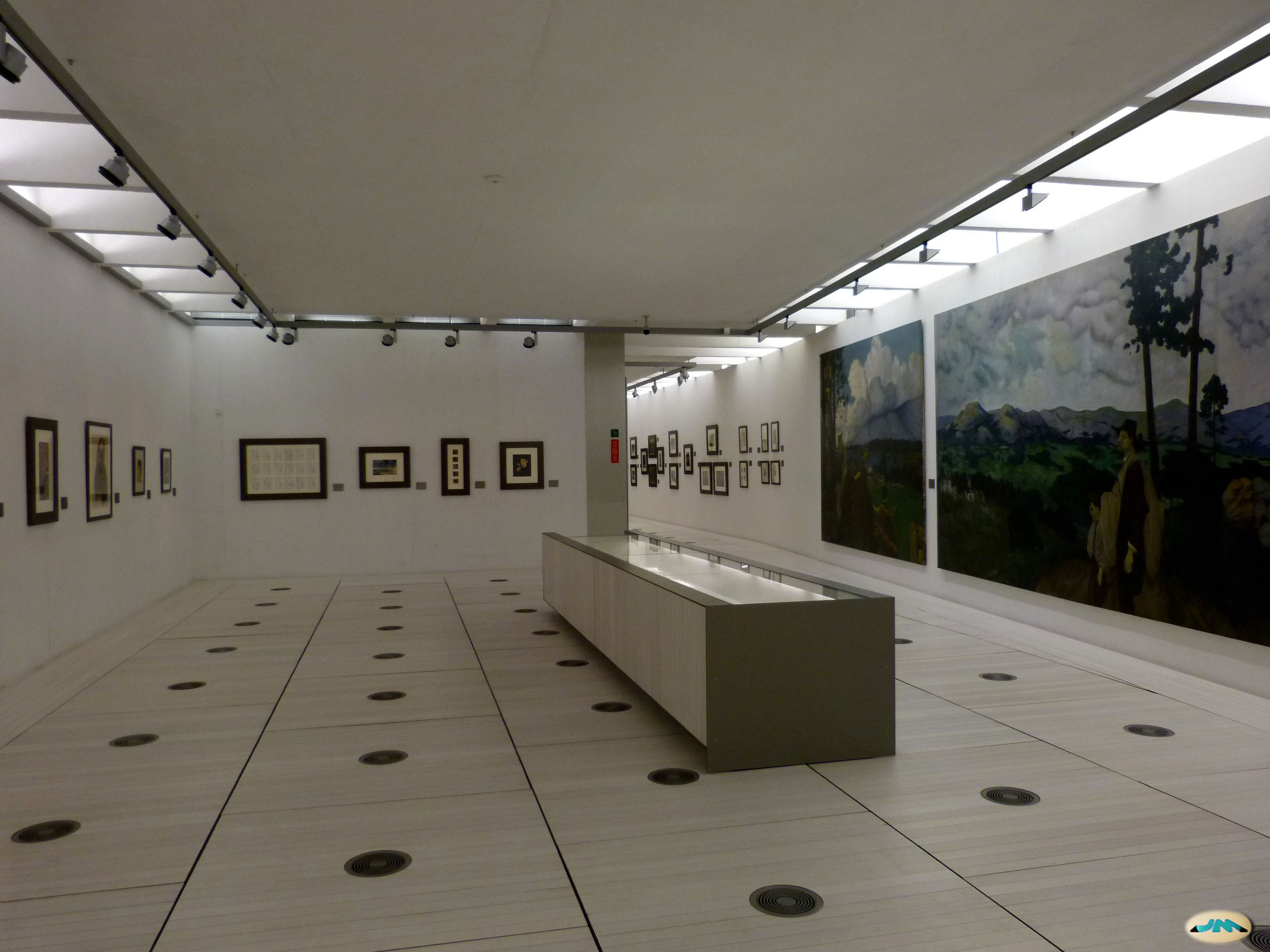
Castelao Museum in Pontevedra

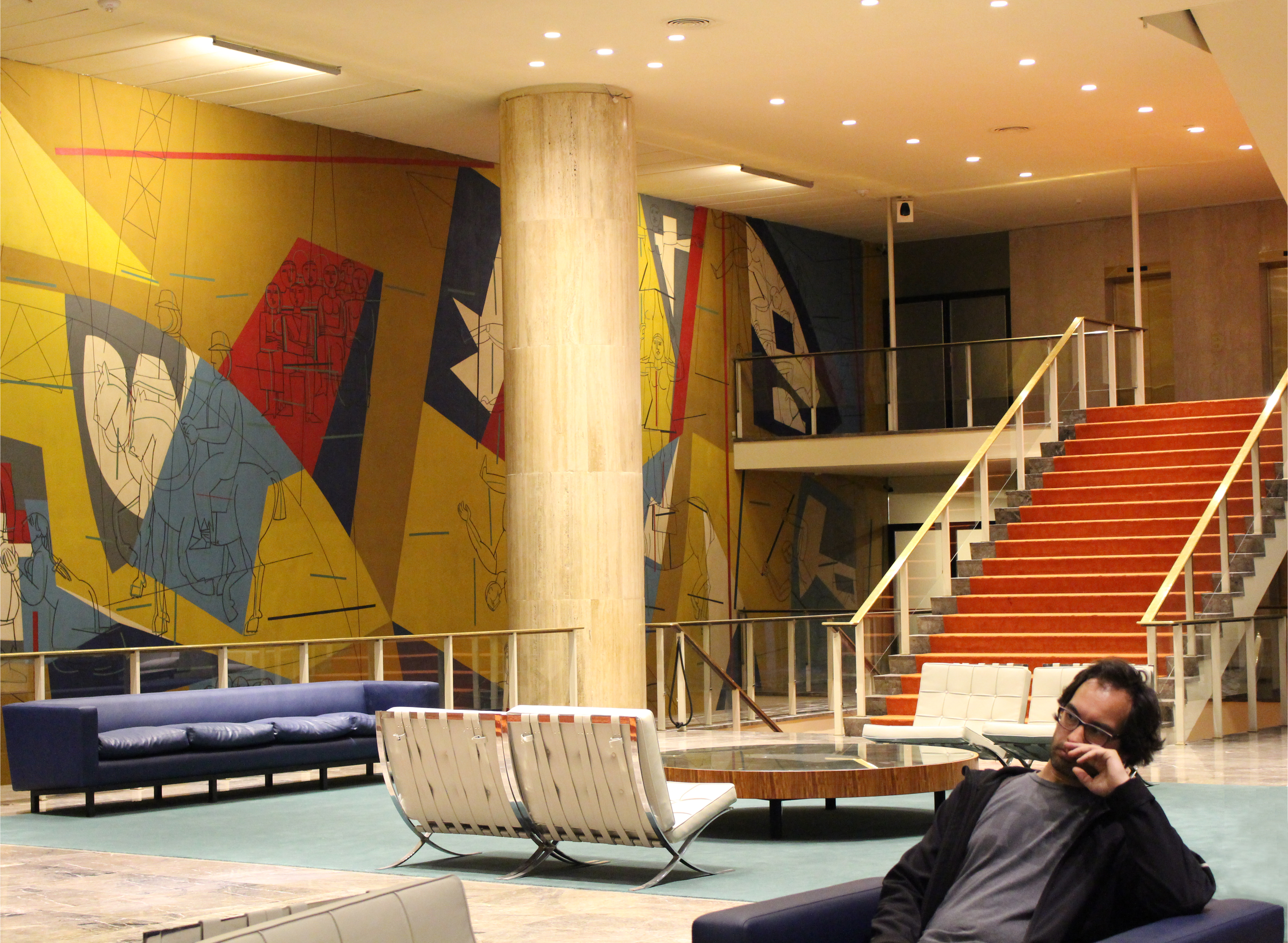
Mural by Seoane

=== Sculpture ===
Francisco Asorey, born in 1889 like his friend Camilo Díaz, followed figurative postulates, but with new themes and expressionist texture. Without reaching the rupturism or the iconoclasm and abstraction of the vanguards, he caused controversies, such as with a sculpture for a parish in A Estrada: the Virgin had a host on her chest and the priest didn't want it. That iconography was also used by Díaz in his posters for the Statute of Autonomy of Galicia, with the coat of arms of the Kingdom of Galicia (today official of the Autonomous Community).

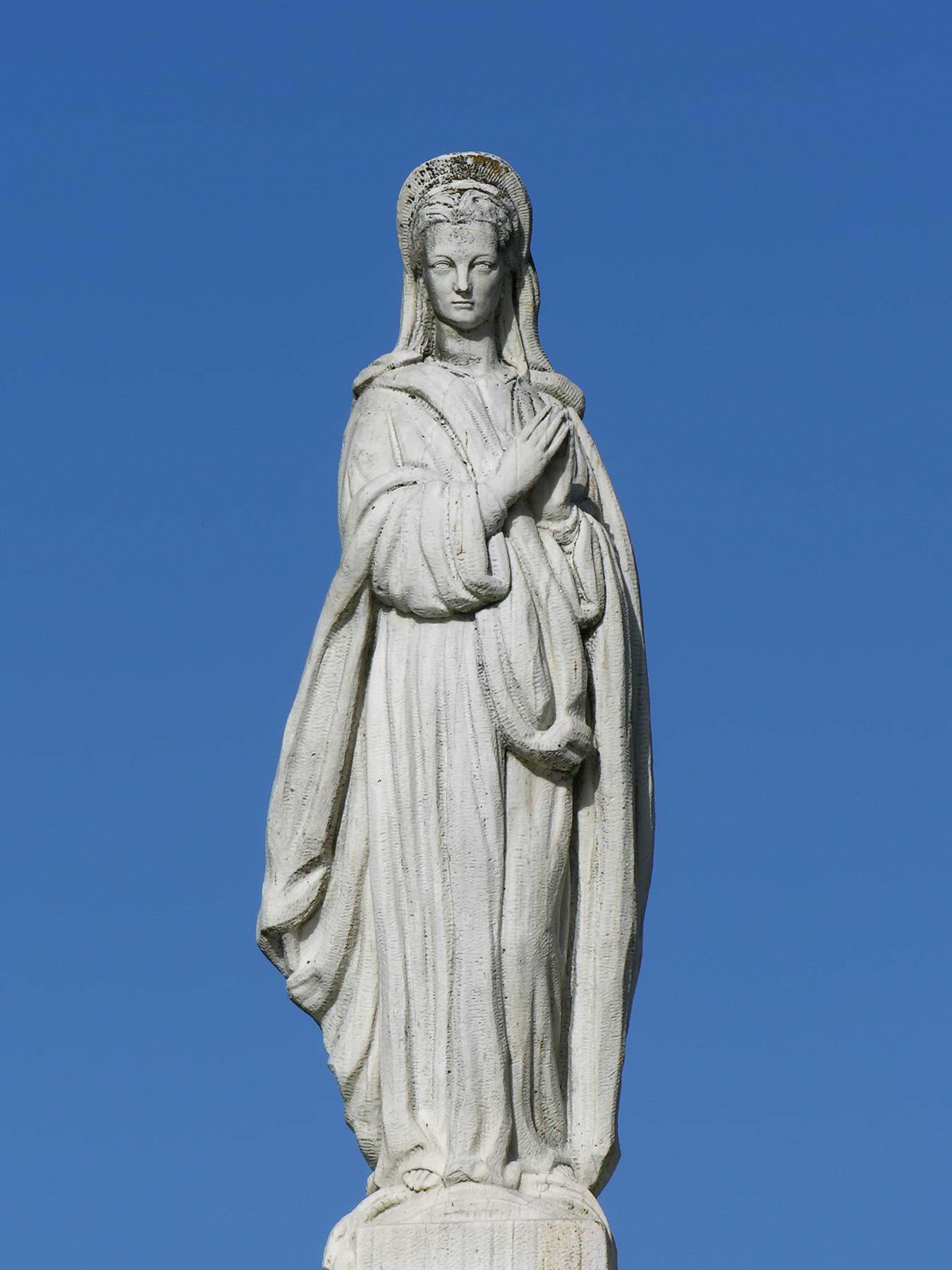
By Asorey

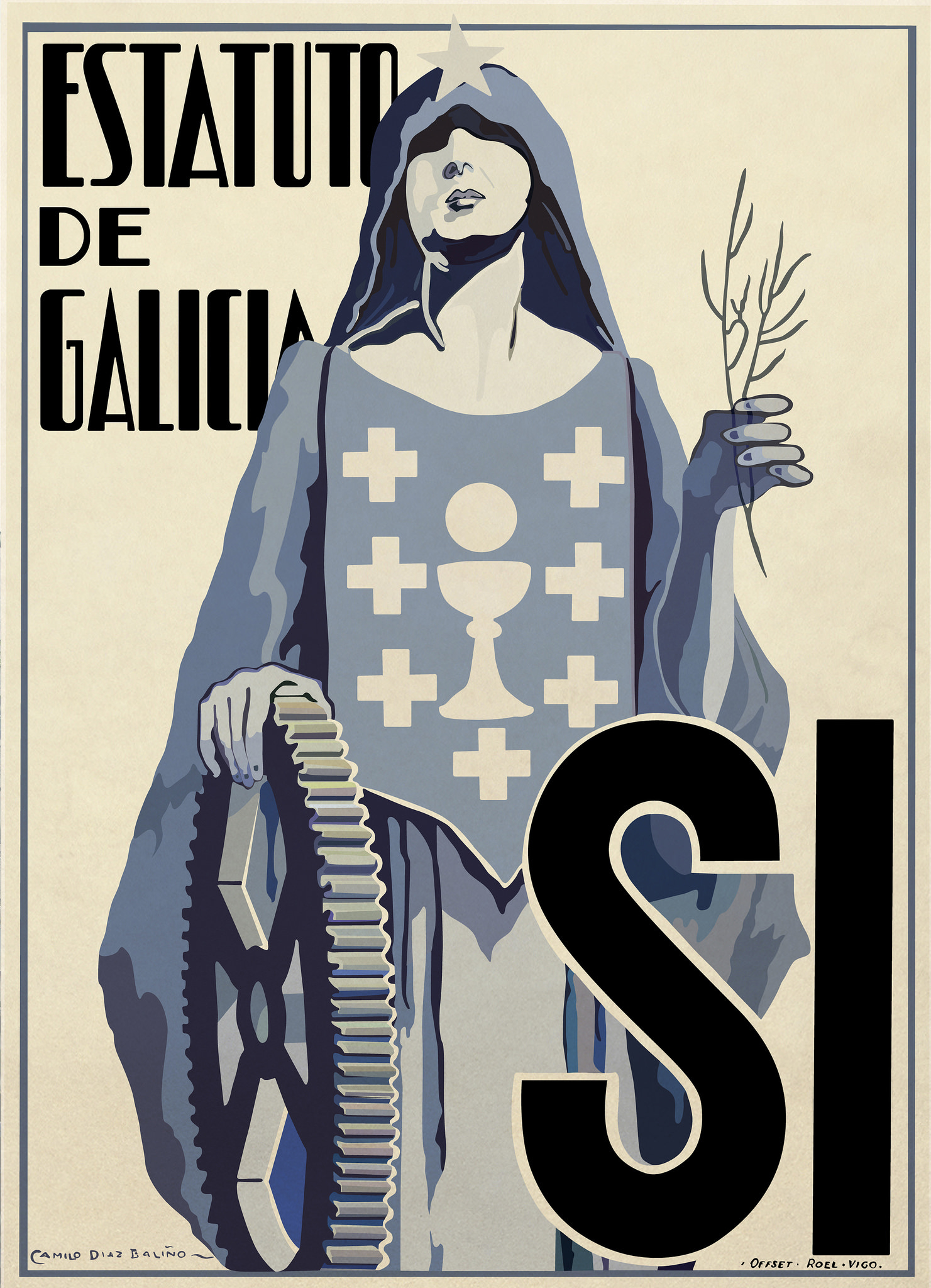
By Díaz Baliño

The war took him many friends, like Díaz, but he continued in internal exile. This led to some forgetfulness later, according to his granddaughter. Asorey made monuments to great figures of Galician culture, such as the Enlightenment philosopher Benito J. Feijoo, the writer Curros Enríquez or the astronomer from Lalín, Pontevedra, Ramón Mª Aller. In 2019, Asorey's sculpture "A Santa" returned to Galicia for an exhibition, after 70 years in Montevideo. The sculpture, created in 1926, received criticism from notable figures such as Valle-Inclán and the Queen of Spain for breaking political correctness at the time. However, Asorey later stated in a press interview in 1956 that this was the work he was most satisfied with.

=== Between tradition and renewal ===
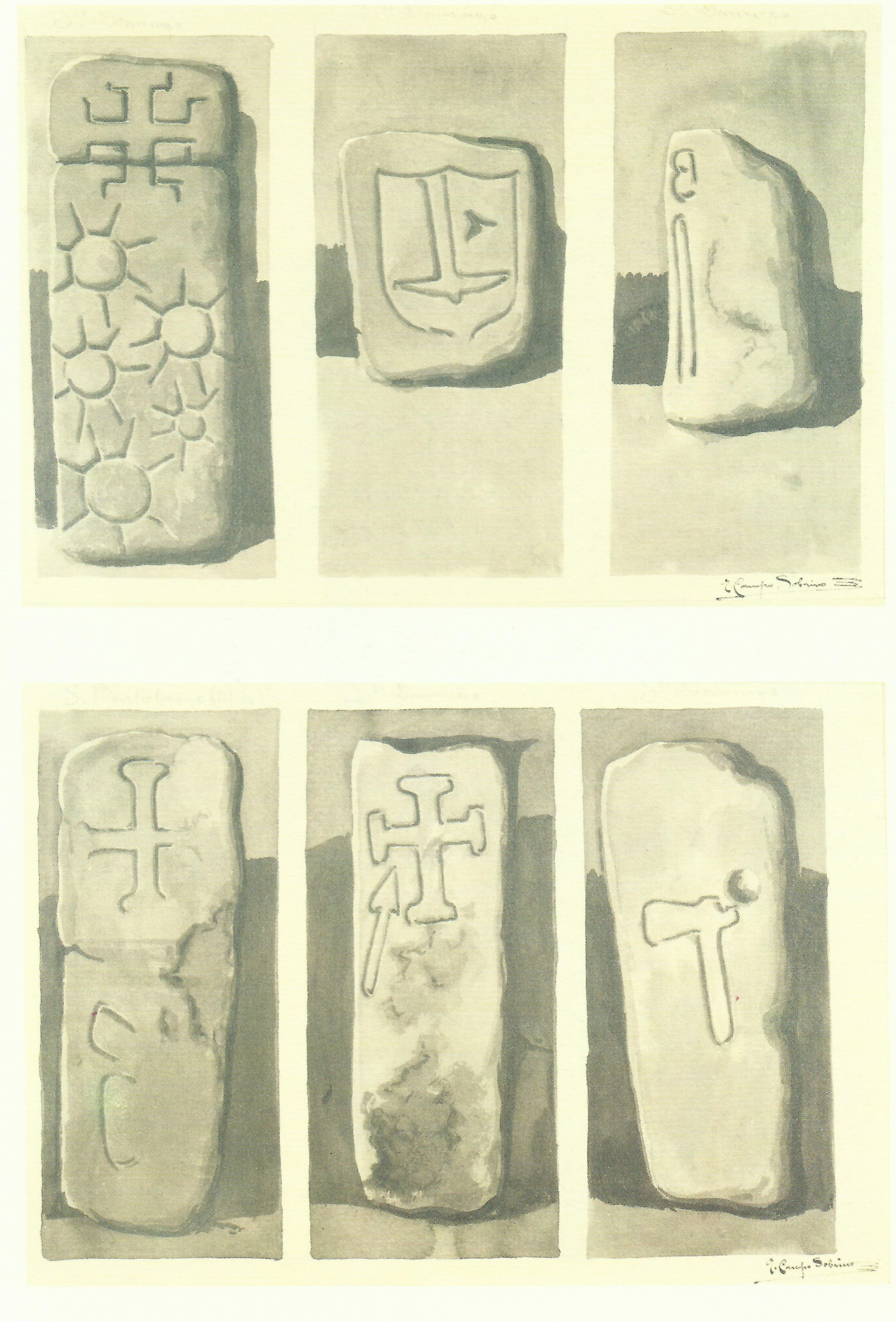
Drawings of archaeological pieces, Enrique Campo

The movement in Galicia was less disruptive than other vanguards. While they valued tradition, they were very cosmopolitan, and the work of other people was fundamental to that movement, from Nós generation to scientists of the Seminary of Galician Studies, archaeologists, etc. Enrique Campo with only four years of work but very intense, practiced with new fields of drawing, archeology and scientific illustration.

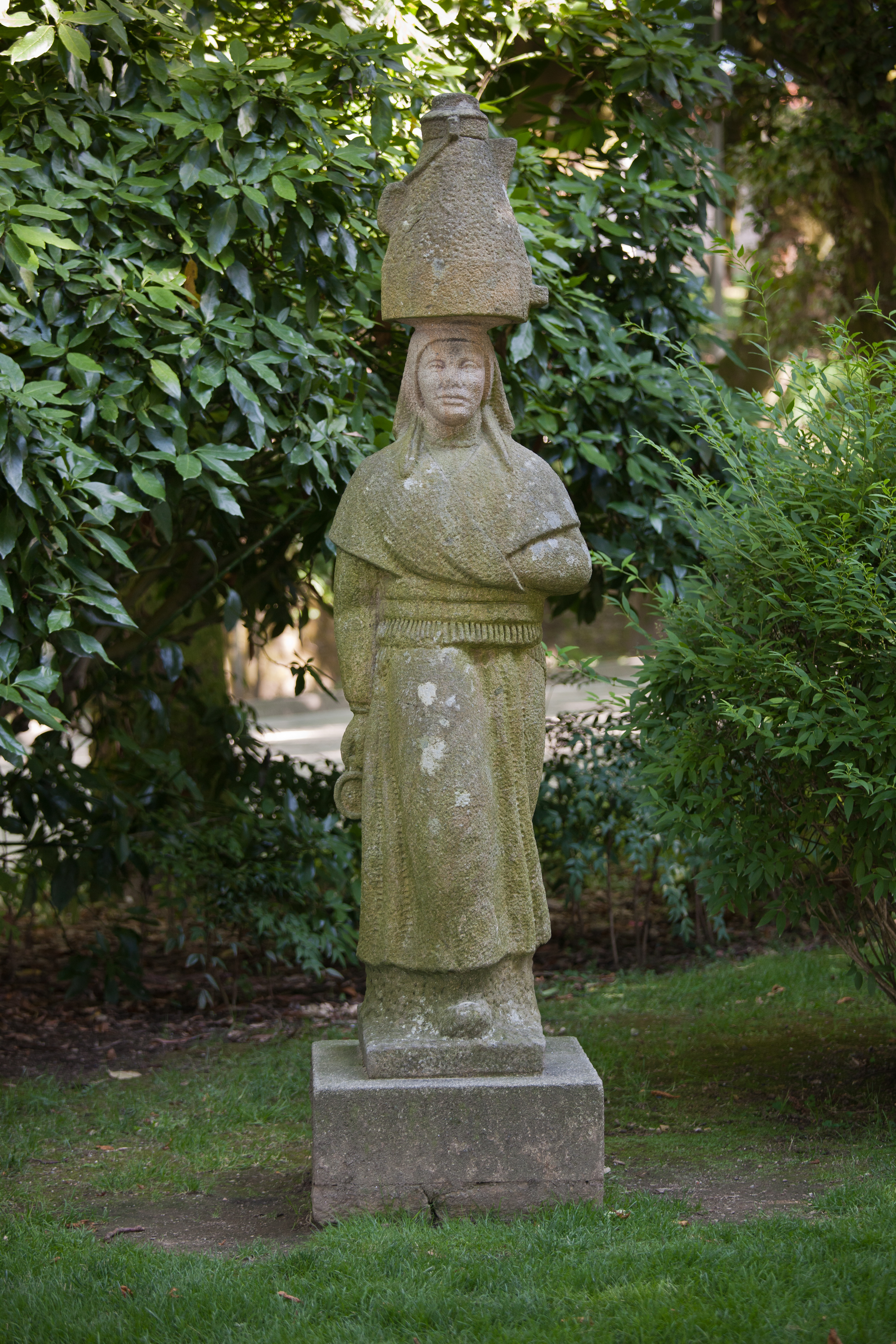
Leiteira, Santiago de Compostela

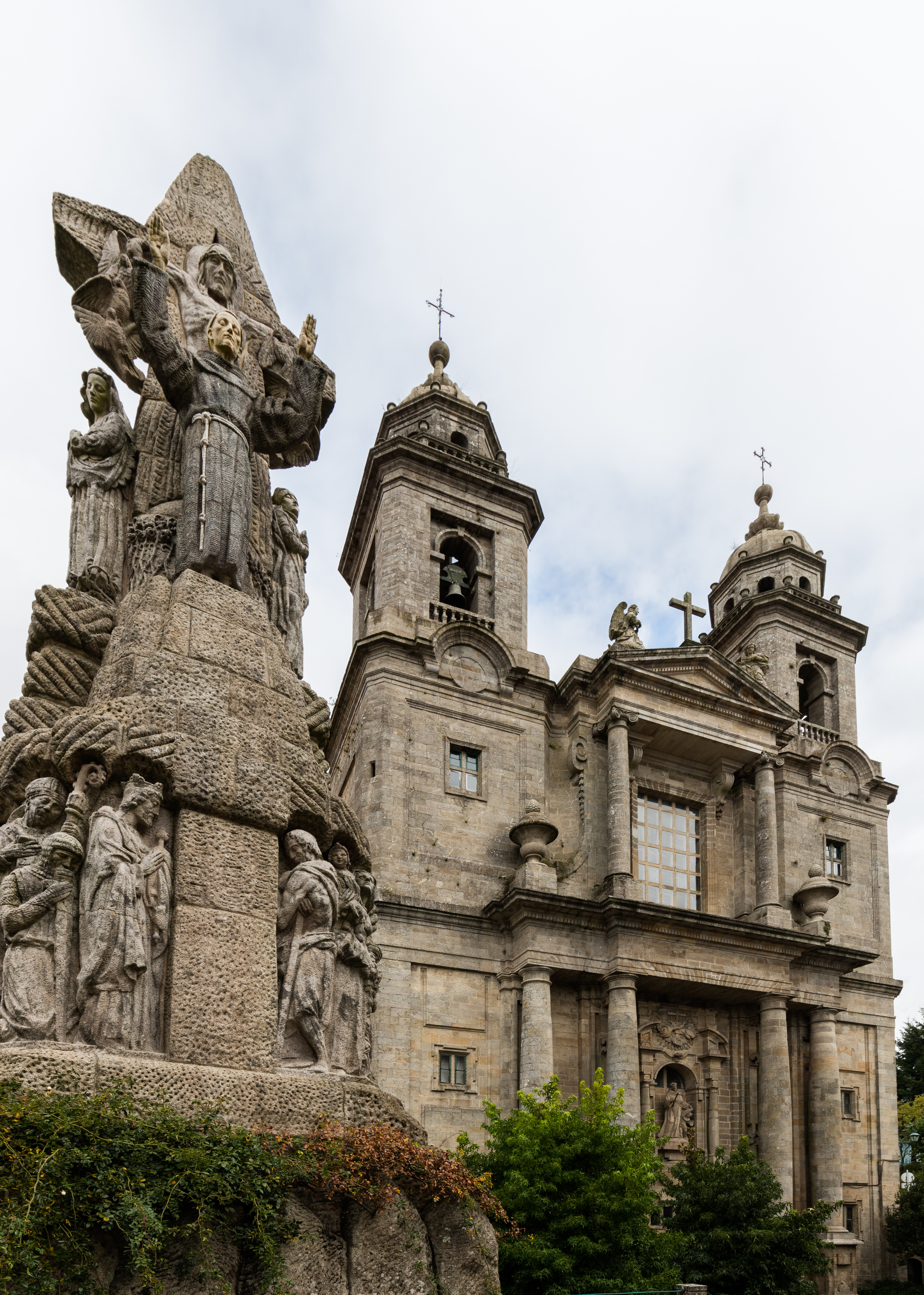
Mosteiro de San Francisco, Compostela

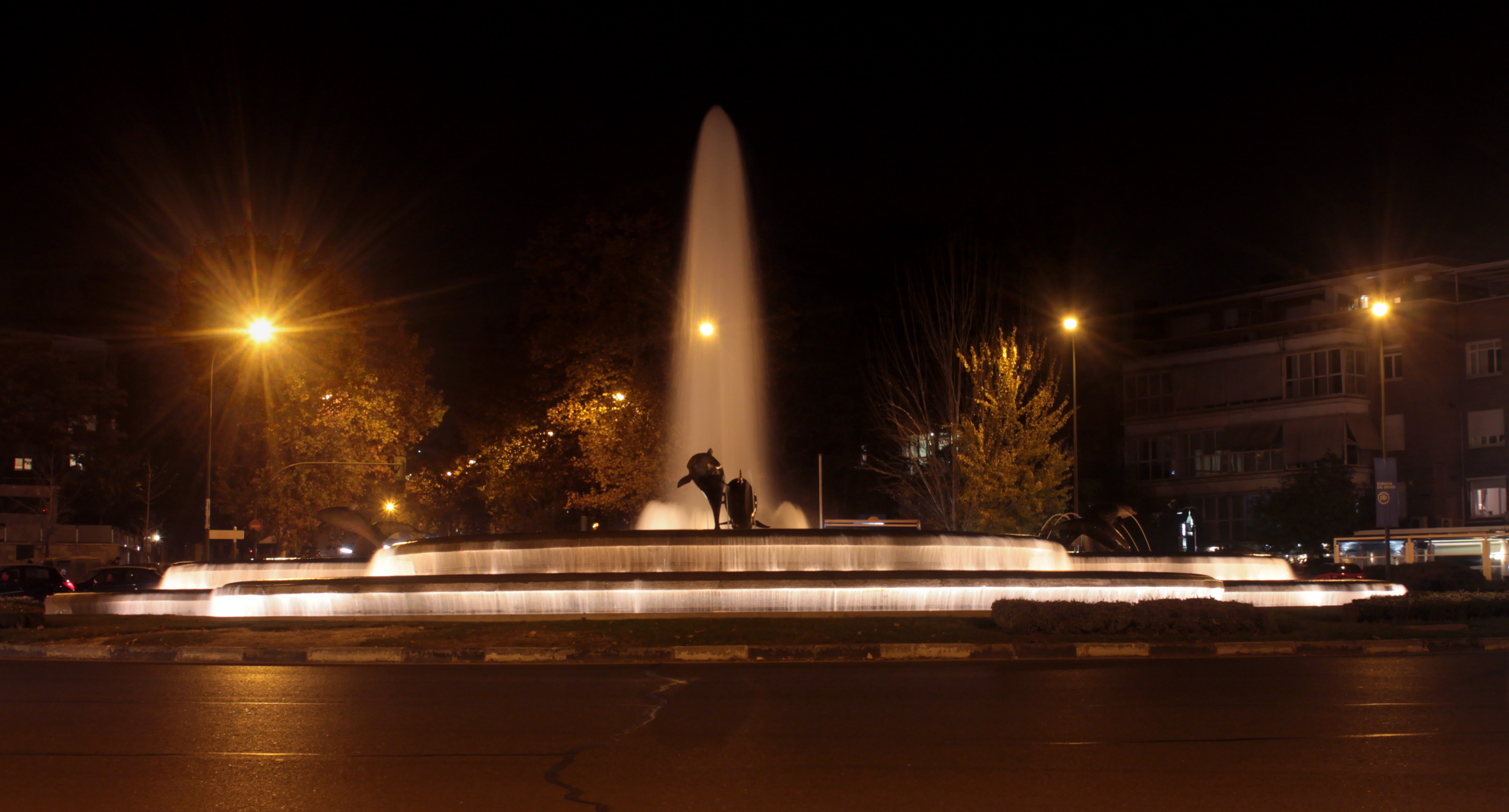
Fountain of Dolphins, Rep. Argentina Square in Madrid

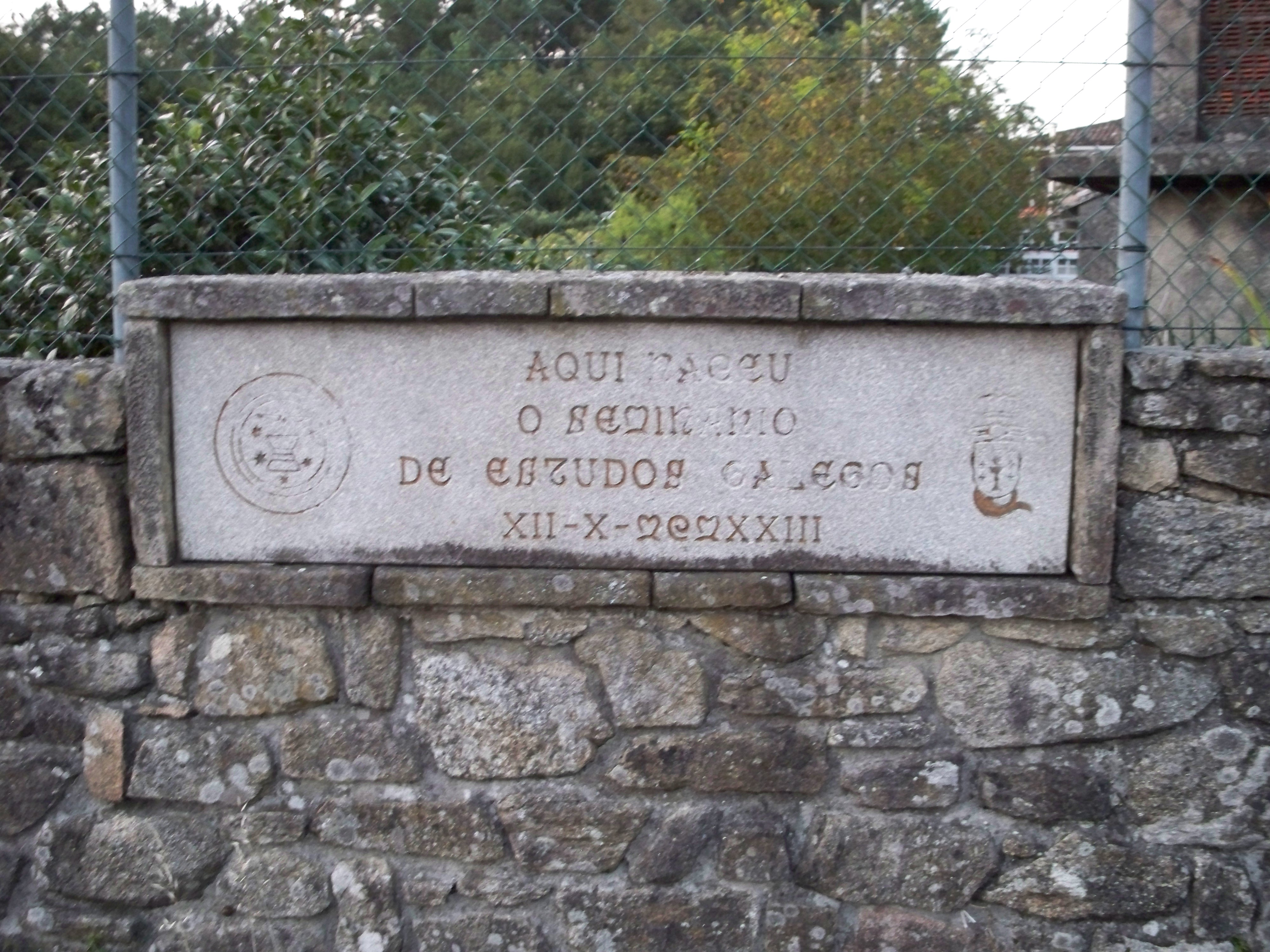
The Renovators provided works to feed the Seminary of Galician Studies, an institution truncated during the Franco regime.

=== The surrealists ===
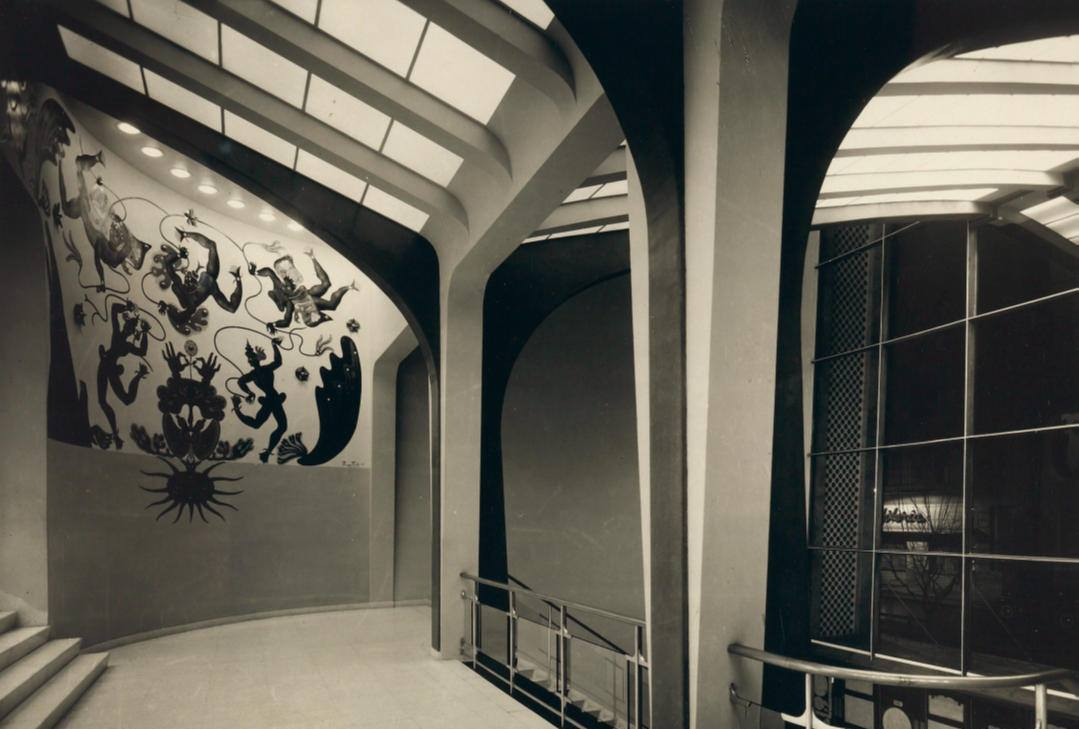
Mural by Mallo at L.A. Cinema in Buenos Aires

Some of the Renovators were influenced by surrealism, like vivarian painter Maruxa Mallo, who had strong ties with surrealists such as Bretón, Lorca and Buñuel. She was far from his homeland, but the Galician sea was included as a theme in her work. During the fascist uprising, Mallo was in Vigo and managed to escape to Portugal. With the help of Gabriela Mistral, Chilean ambassador in Lisbon, could travel to Americas, where she was in touch with Seoane. Other artists marked by the war were Francisco Miguel, killed in 1936; he worked with Siqueiros and illustrated works by Borges and Mistral. The painter Urbano Lugrís, son of Lugrís Freire, an intellectual contrary to Franco, was forced to take the side of fascism, like other artists. He also worked on set designs and architecture, such as the Surrealist chapel of Magi, in Bueu.

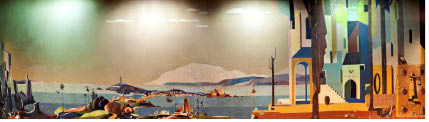
"Vista da Coruña 1669", mural by Lugrís declared of Cultural Interest

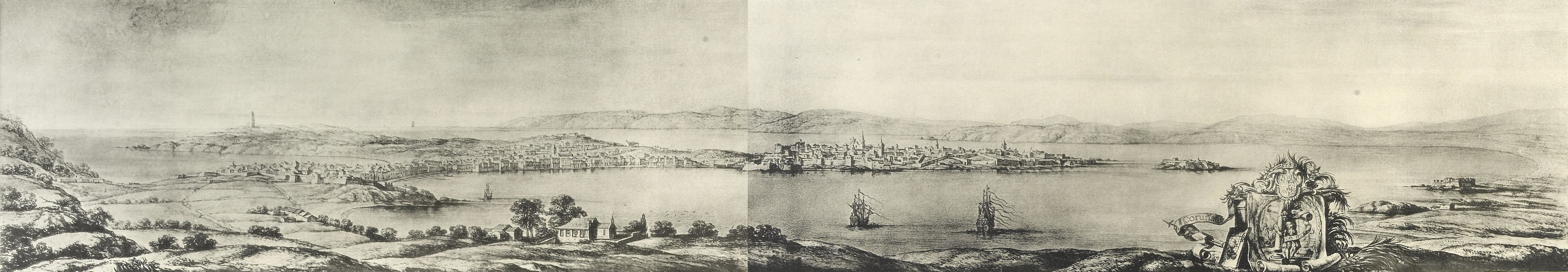
"View of Coruña", by Pier Mª Baldi, in 1669

=== Scenography and theater ===
In the 1920s, members of Irmandades were involved in theater and founded Escola Dramática Galega, with notable playwrights such as Cotarelo Valledor and Vicente Risco. Noriega Varela and Cabanillas bridged the gap between 19th century and the avant-gardes. Cabanillas assimilates the poetry of Curros, Rosalía de Castro and Pondal, also taking modernist elements. Rafael Dieste was the most prominent author in the Generation of 25, and the scenography was diverse, with surrealist and symbolist elements. Lorca founded La Barraca in the early 1930s where Lugrís and Ernesto G. da Cal participated in the scenography. Lorca wrote Six poems in Galician in 1935 as a result of his friendship with Galician artists.

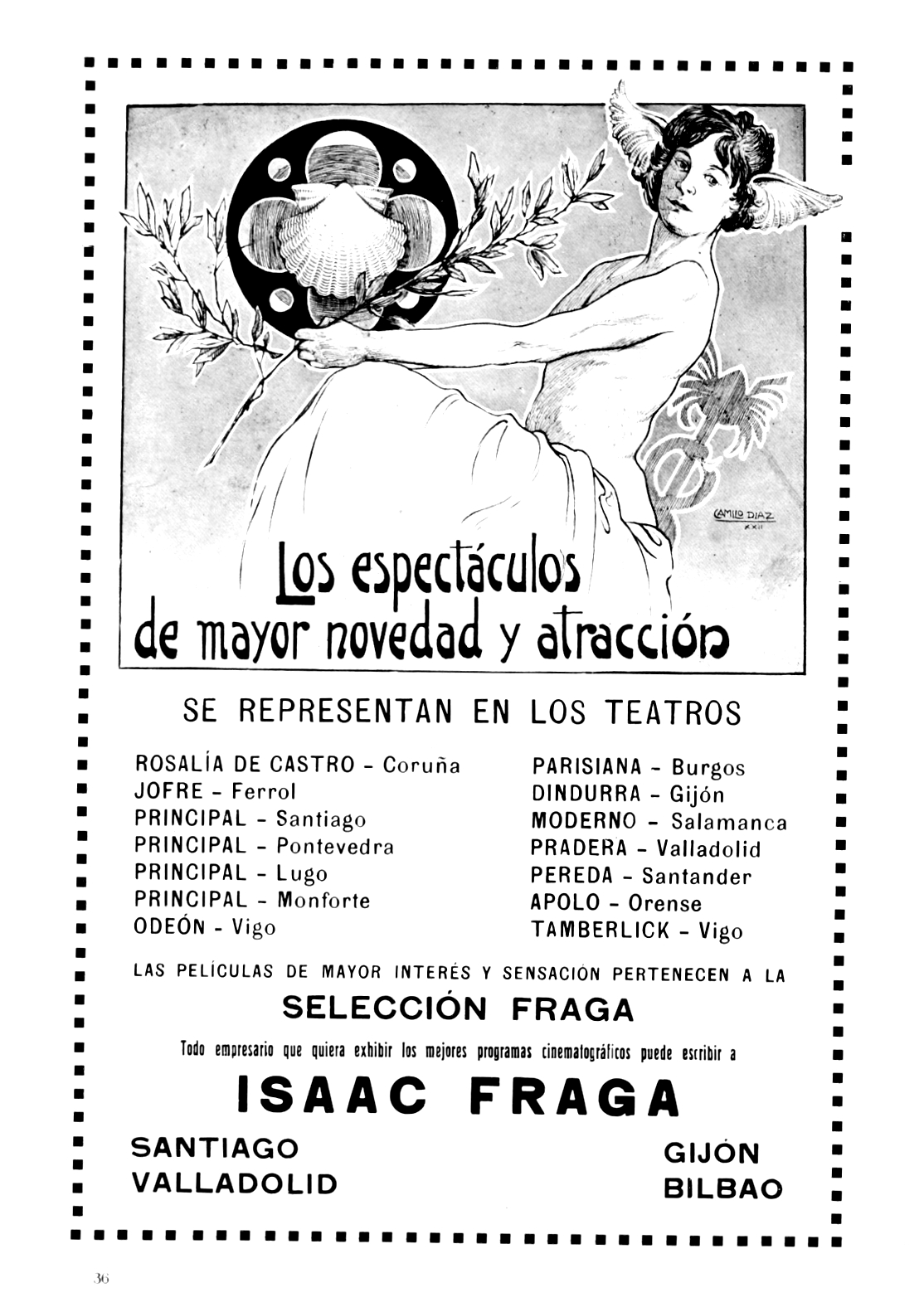
Isaac Fraga Theater in 1922. Twenty years later he built the first cinema in Galicia

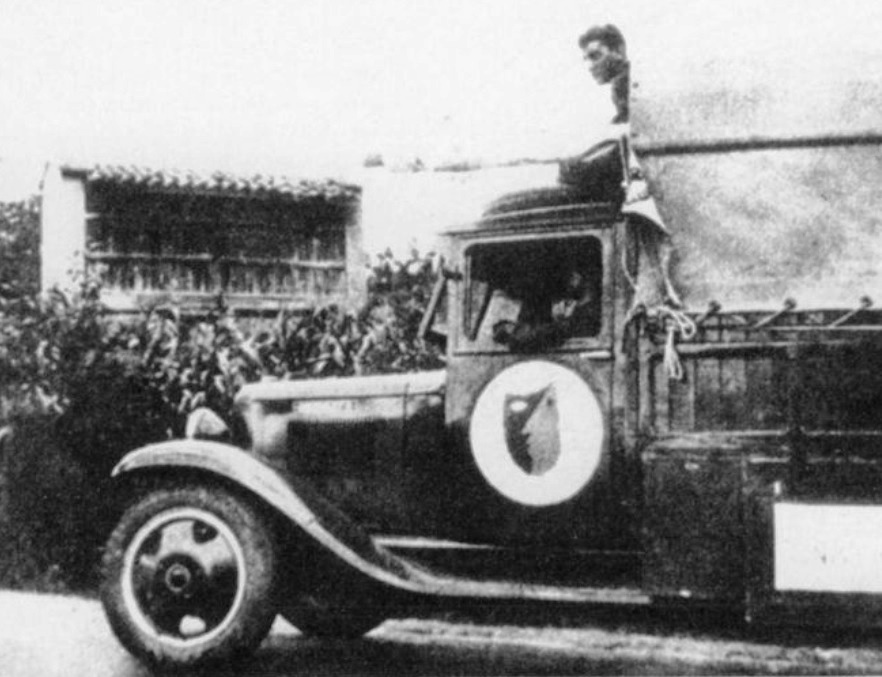
La Barraca going to Vigo. Guerra da Cal was in the early days of the company, and acted as a 'linguistic assistant' for the Six Galician poems by Lorca.

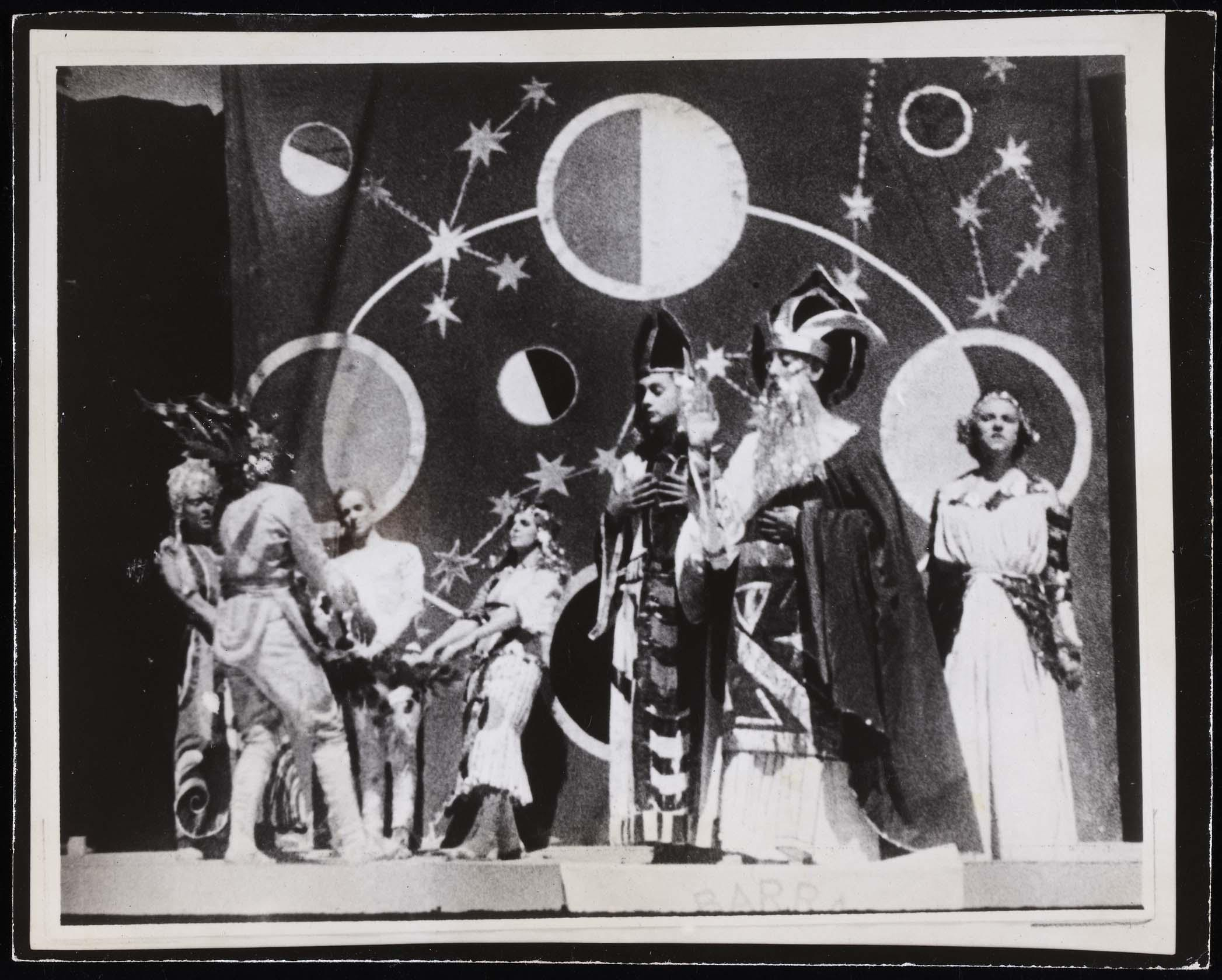
Urbano Lugrís worked as a scenographer for several years with 'La Barraca'.

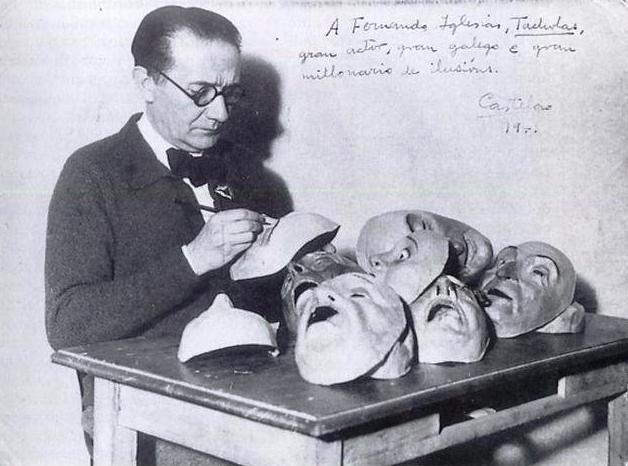
Castelao, already in exile, painting the masks for Os vellos non-deben de namorar

=== Graphic humor ===
Galician humor and satire have a long tradition, from sneering medieval poems to modern-day comics (the first Galician comic strips are published in 1888 and in the first decades of the 20th century drawing was analysis tool in the key of socio-political criticism or charge). Authors like Risco and Otero Pedrayo, who portrayed Diego Gelmires as a comedian, used satire to comment on Galician society. Pioneers of puppetry like Barriga Verde reflected with humor the quarrels between Galicians and Portuguese, as Gabriel Feijóo had done centuries before. Artists like Maside and Díaz drew inspiration from illustrations and caricatures of Central European humor. Castelao and Luis Bagaría (although Catalan by birth, he was a close friend of a lot of Galician artists) were two of the most influential graphic humorists in Galicia, and Vázquez Díaz combined classic portraits in sculpture with satire in his penguin, closely linked to surrealism, for which he suffered censorship.

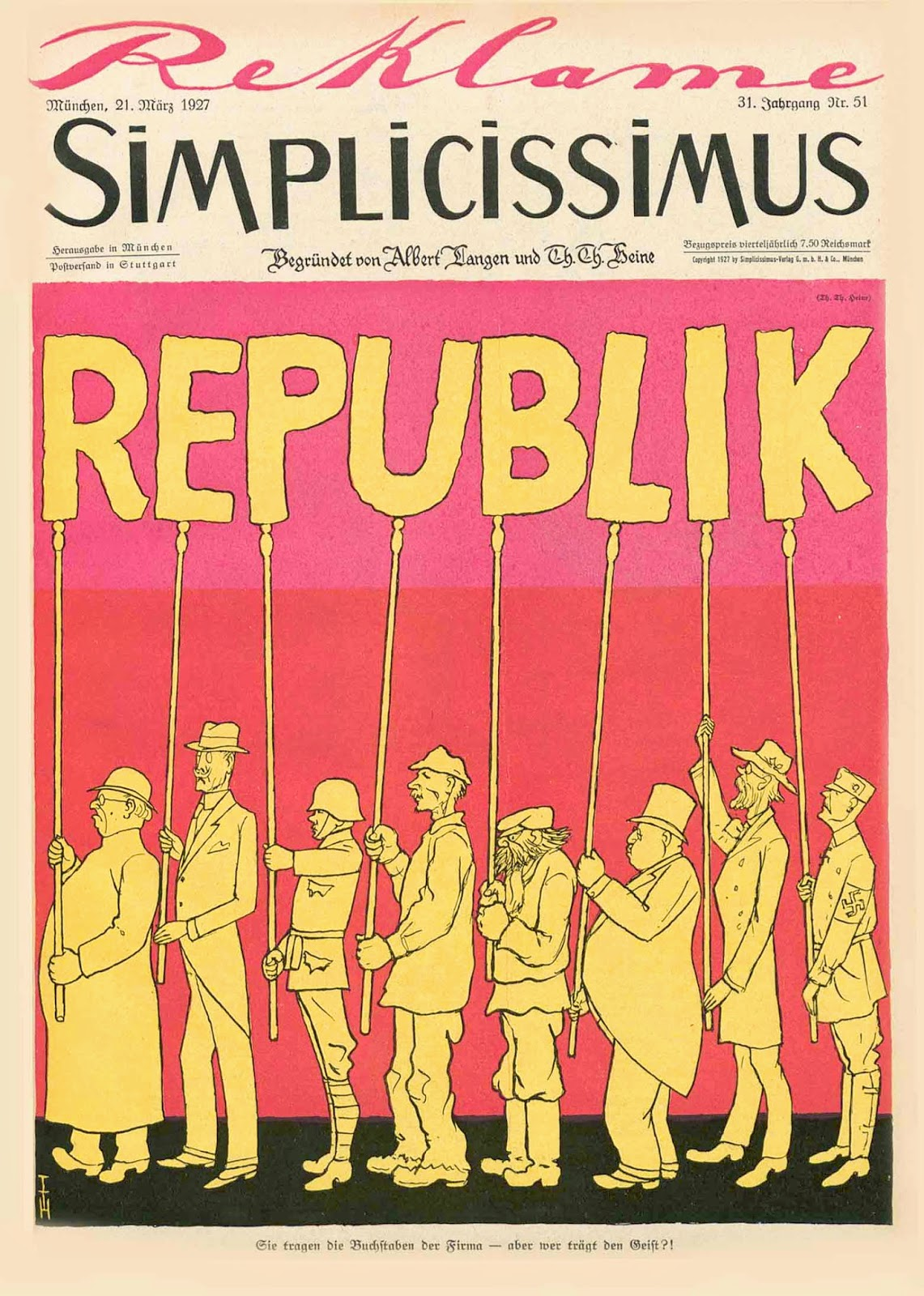
Caricature of the Weimar Republic as a "republic without republicans". Bagaria and Castelao would receive great influence from these authors

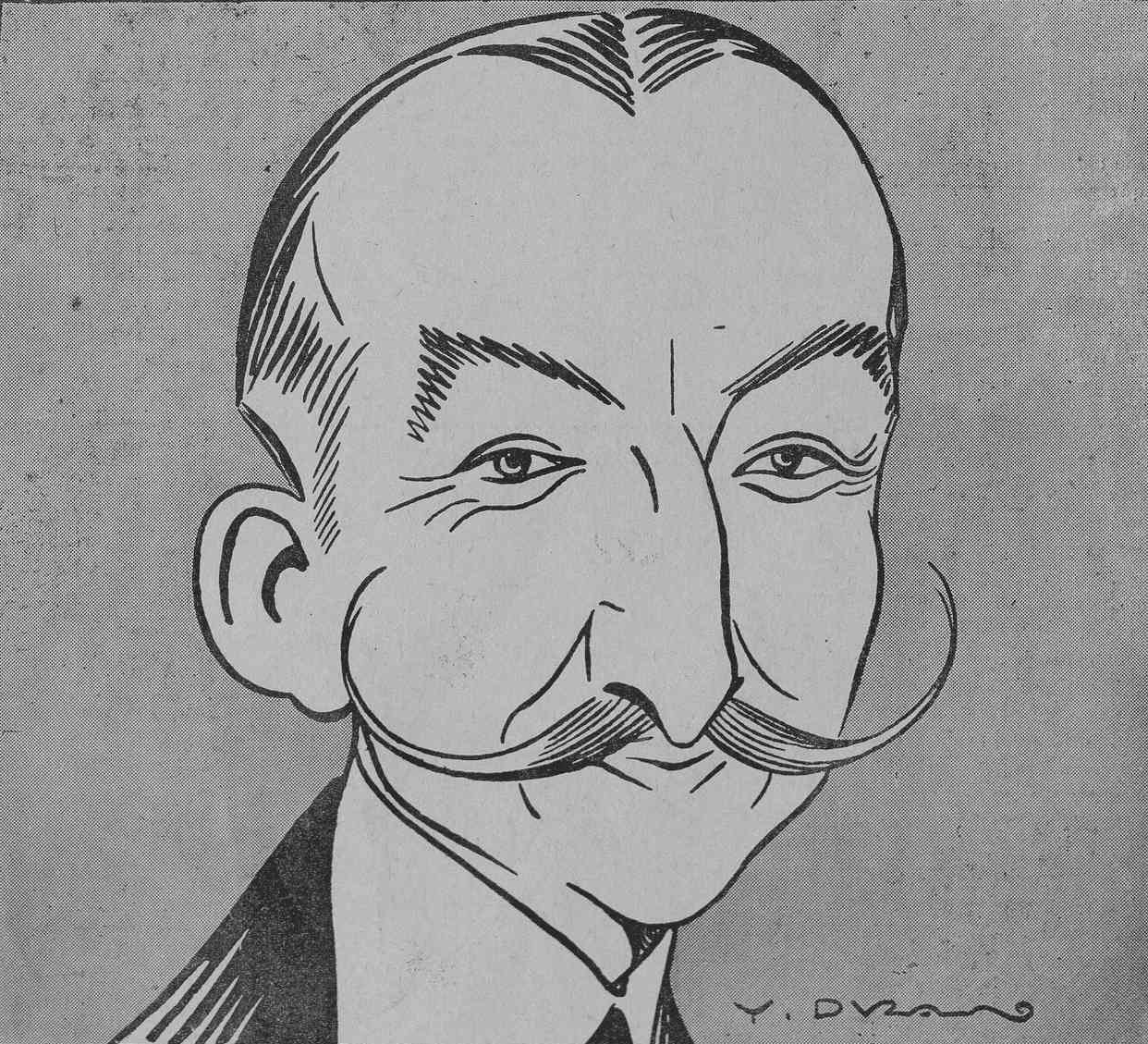
Pedro Muñoz Seca

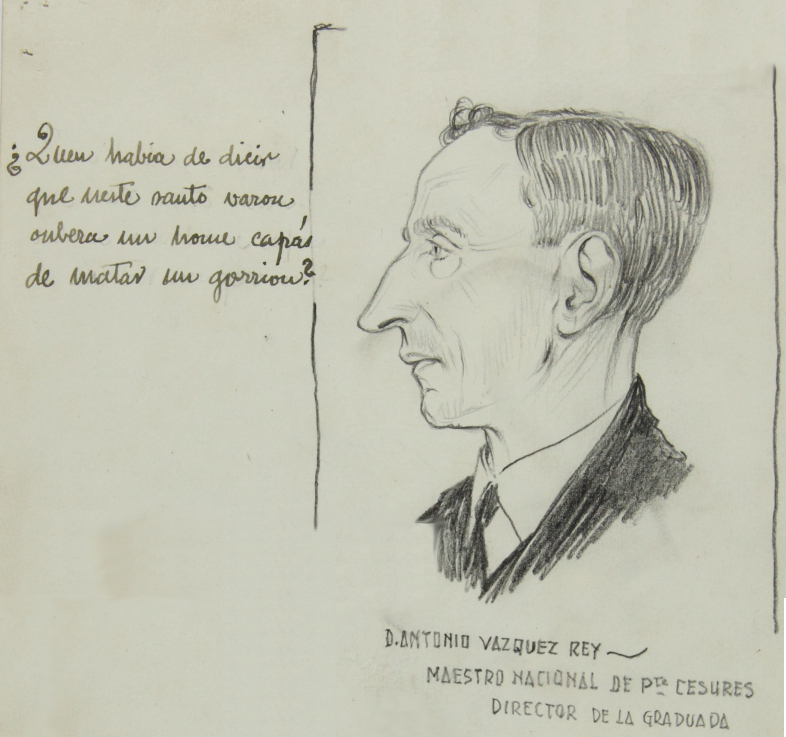
Antonio Vázquez Rei, by Camilo Díaz Baliño

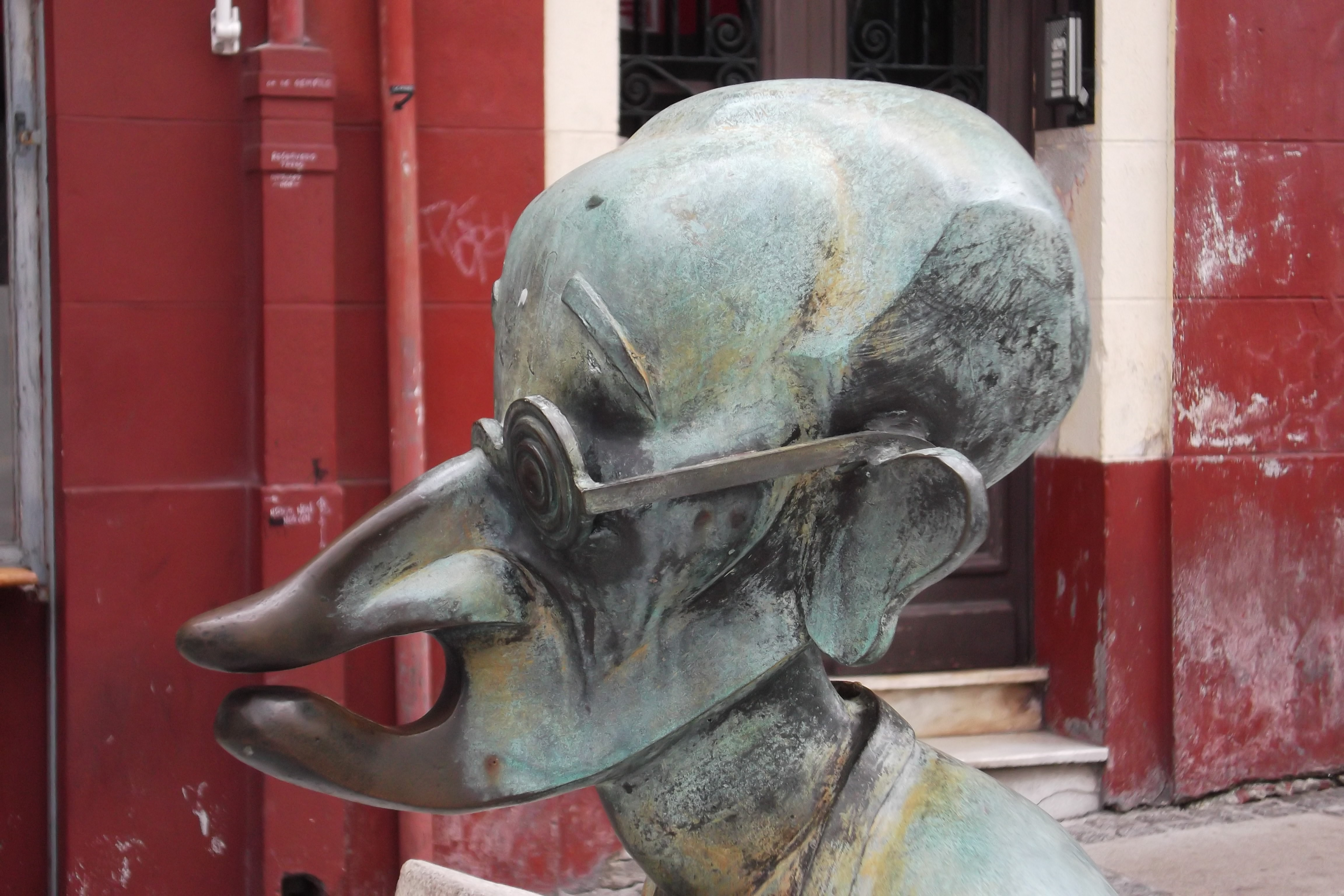
Vicente Risco honored at Praça do Humor, in A Coruña

== Legacy ==
The renewal of art influenced the next generation of Galician artists, called by some Segundos Renovadores. The exiles then participated in new forms of drawing, painting, muralism, architecture, typography or ceramics. Artists such as Seoane, the Granell brothers, Maruxa Mallo and others found a great echo within the so-called "internal exile"; for example Bello Piñeiro, promoter of the Sargadelos pottery, founded upon their return to Galicia by Luis and Maruxa Seoane and Isaac Díaz Pardo among others.

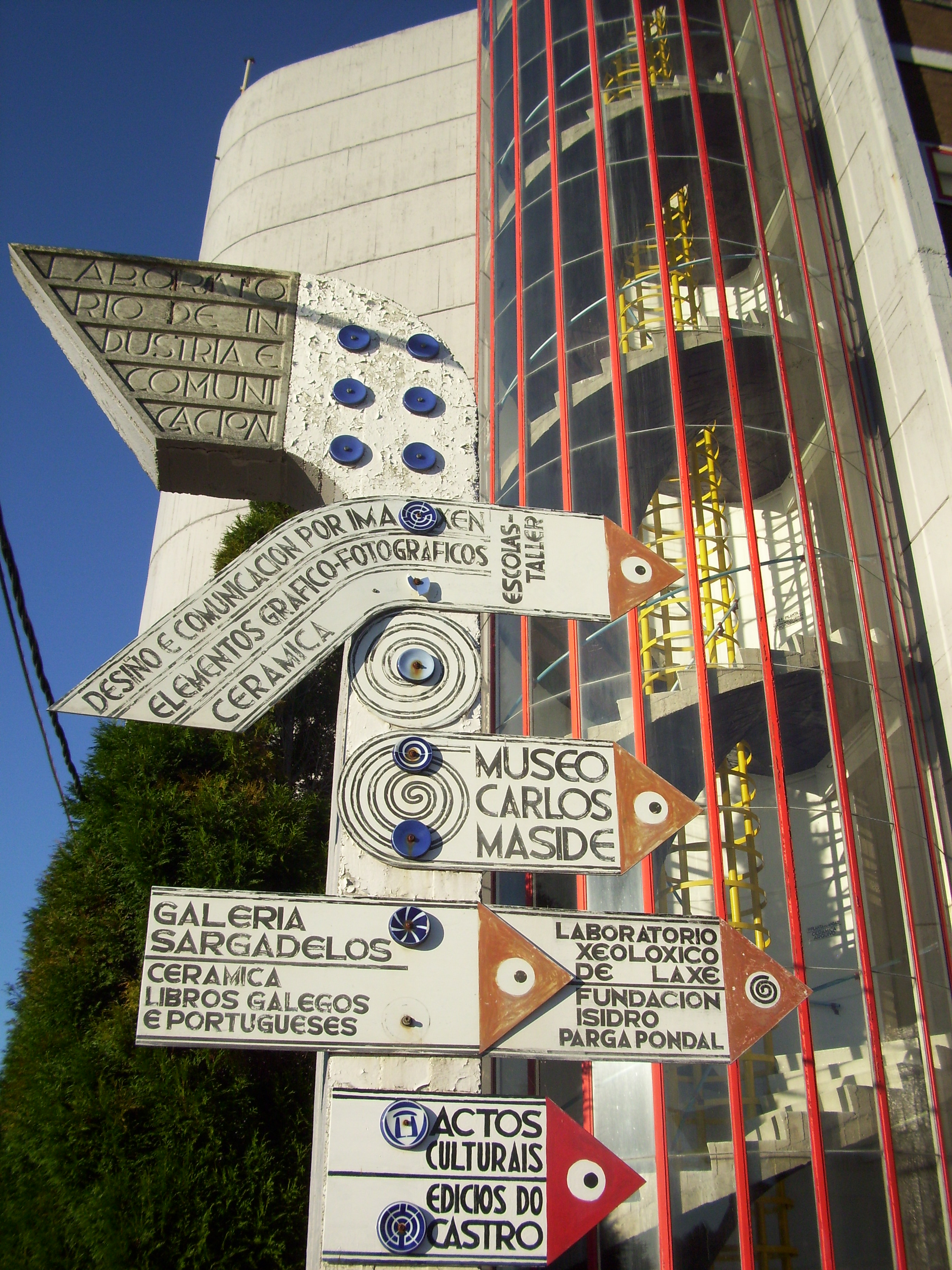
Indicator in the Cerámicas do Castro complex.

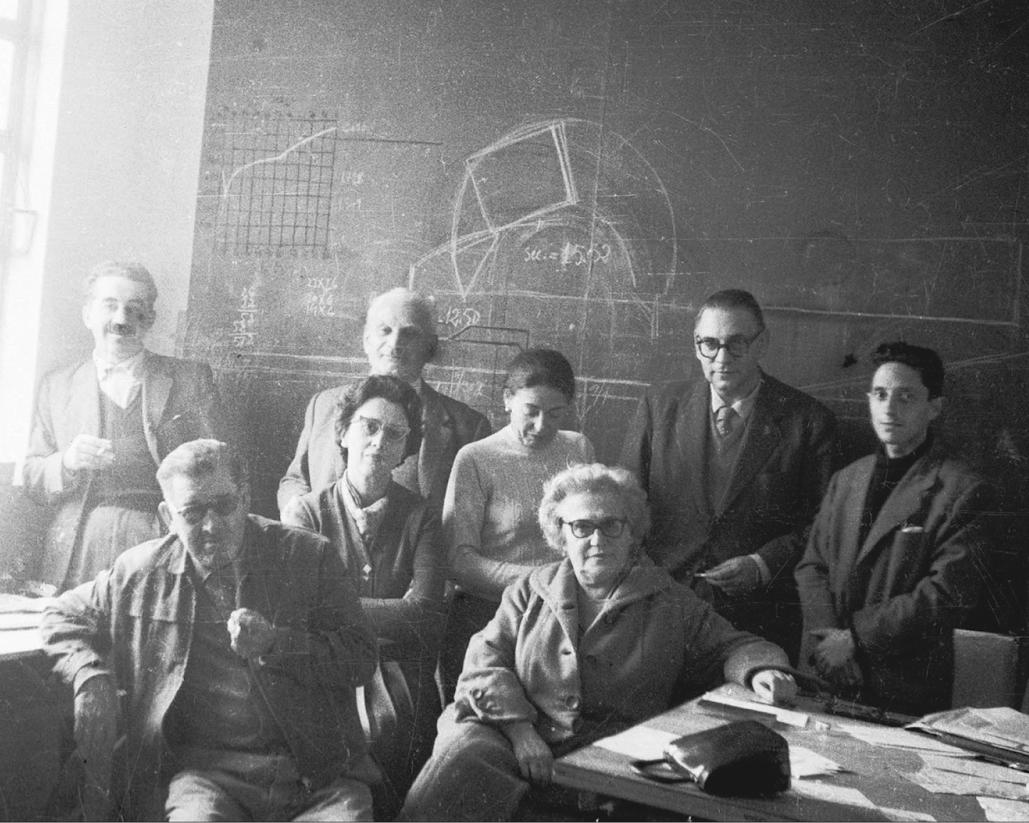
Luis Seoane, Díaz Pardo, the Núñez-Búa, the Sofovich and the Scheimberg in Magdalena

=== Typography ===
The renovators created new fonts and recovered traditional typography in stone, which was continued by Laboratorio de Formas. Recent creators standardized fonts based on them, such as Vila Morena by Ipanema Gráfica and Gallaecia Castelo by Carlos Núñez.

Marcos Dopico and Natalia Crecente from the University of Vigo analyzed their typographic program, which combined traditional fonts from different origins with the systematization of the Bauhaus and the Ulm school, and according to Díaz Pardo, the Soviet Vkhutemas.

Graphic work was developed in a local environment, linked to areas close to the art, artisanal manufacturing, stonework or illustration (...)

The foundations set out to collect its characteristic features from history to create a system of self-expression. For this, several sources would be used; rock carving, inscriptions on church arches, petroglyphs, carving on craft tools, bread sculptures from San André de Teixido, traditional ceramics, lace from the Coast... in short, all the heritage elements of Galician culture.

The principles of modernity, with one eye on the Bauhaus and the Ulm school and the other on the uniqueness of the geographical and cultural context, avoiding any standardization, have evolved here to "enrich the world with our difference", an ideology applied to all the products they come out of the Laboratory.

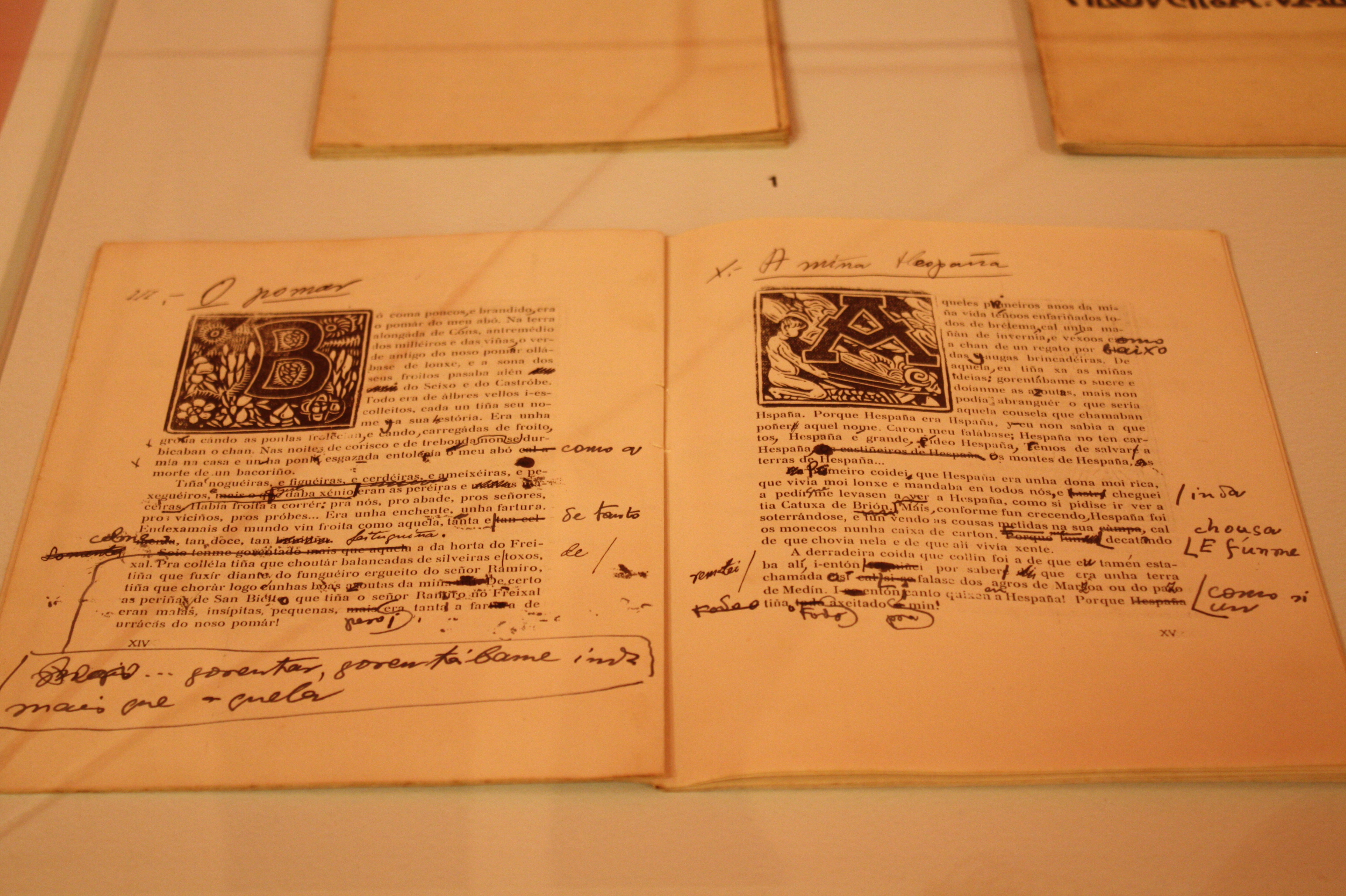
Illustration by Luís Pintos Fonseca for Os Nenos by Xosé Filgueira Valverde

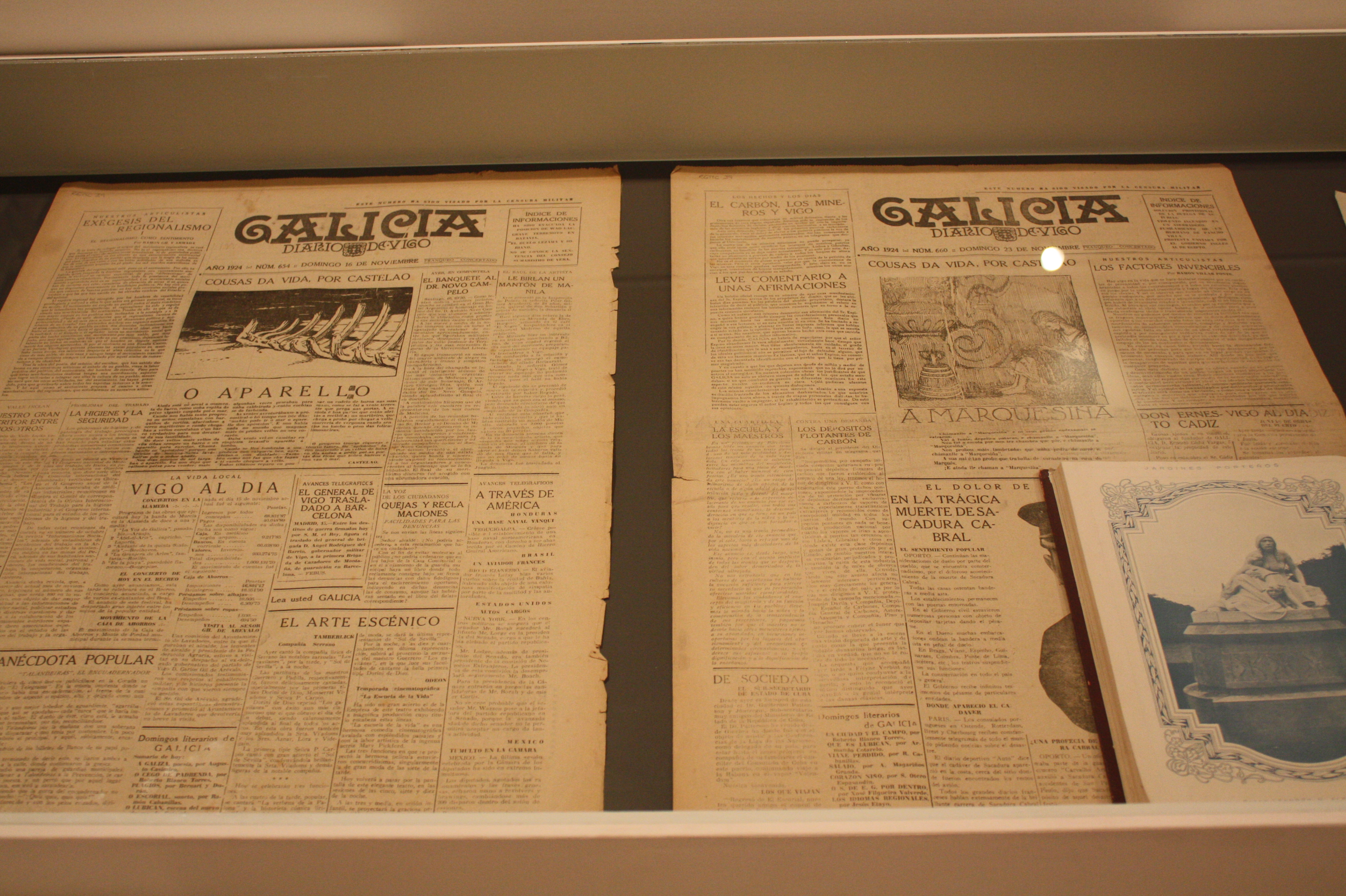
Two copies of the newspaper "Galicia. Diario de Vigo"

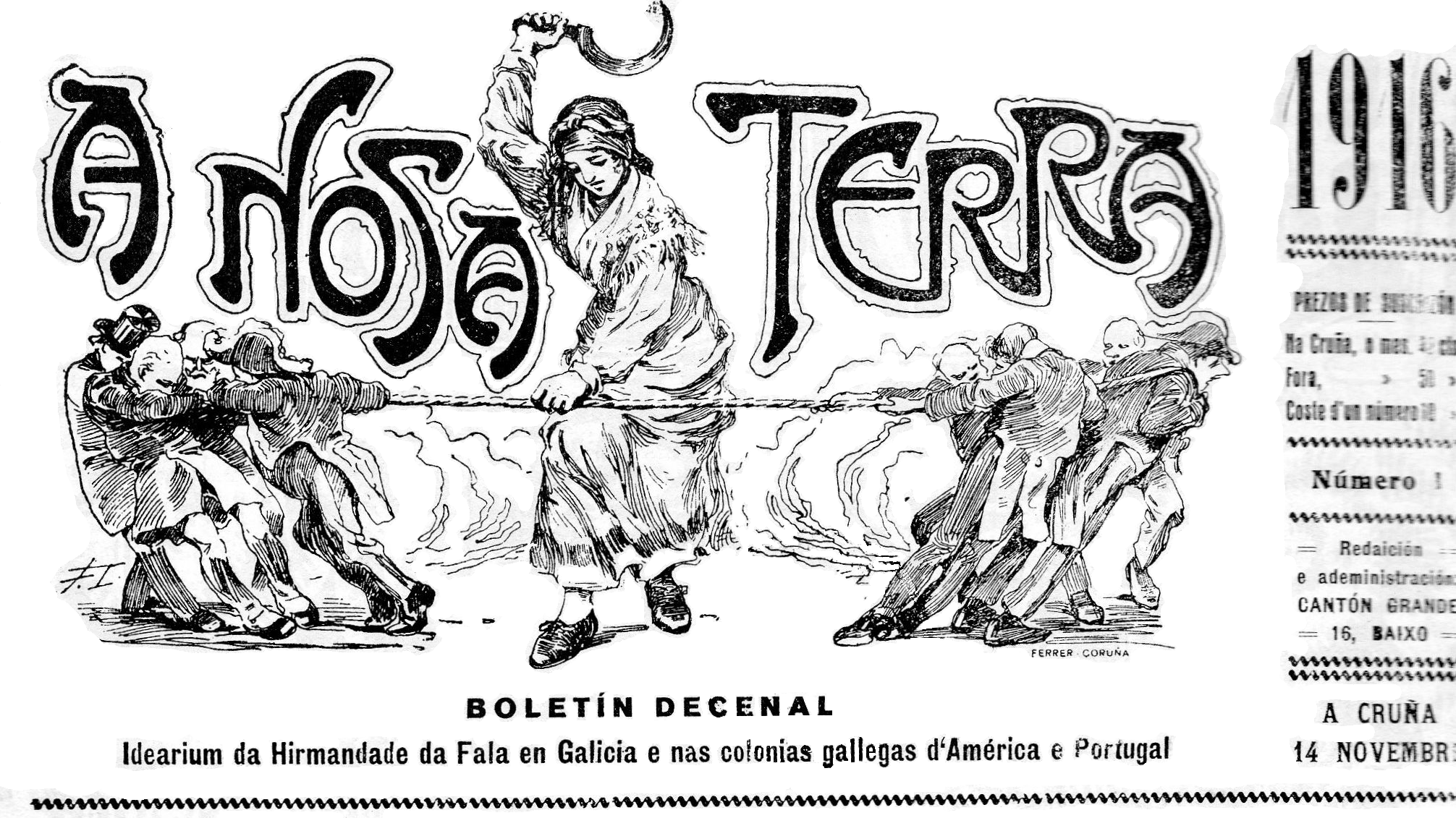
Head of A Nosa Terra

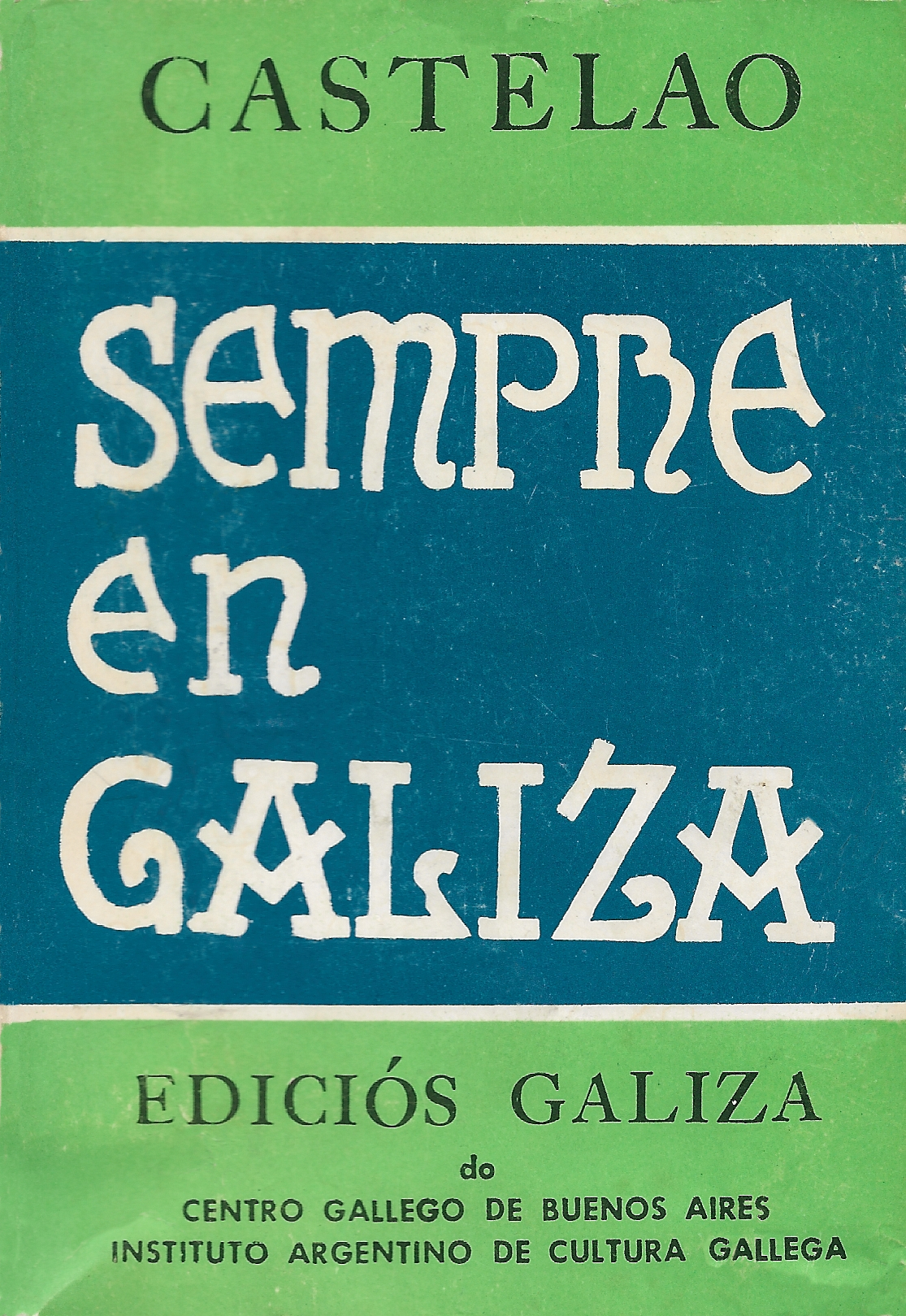
Cover of the essay 'Sempre em Galiza' (Always in Galicia) by Castelao

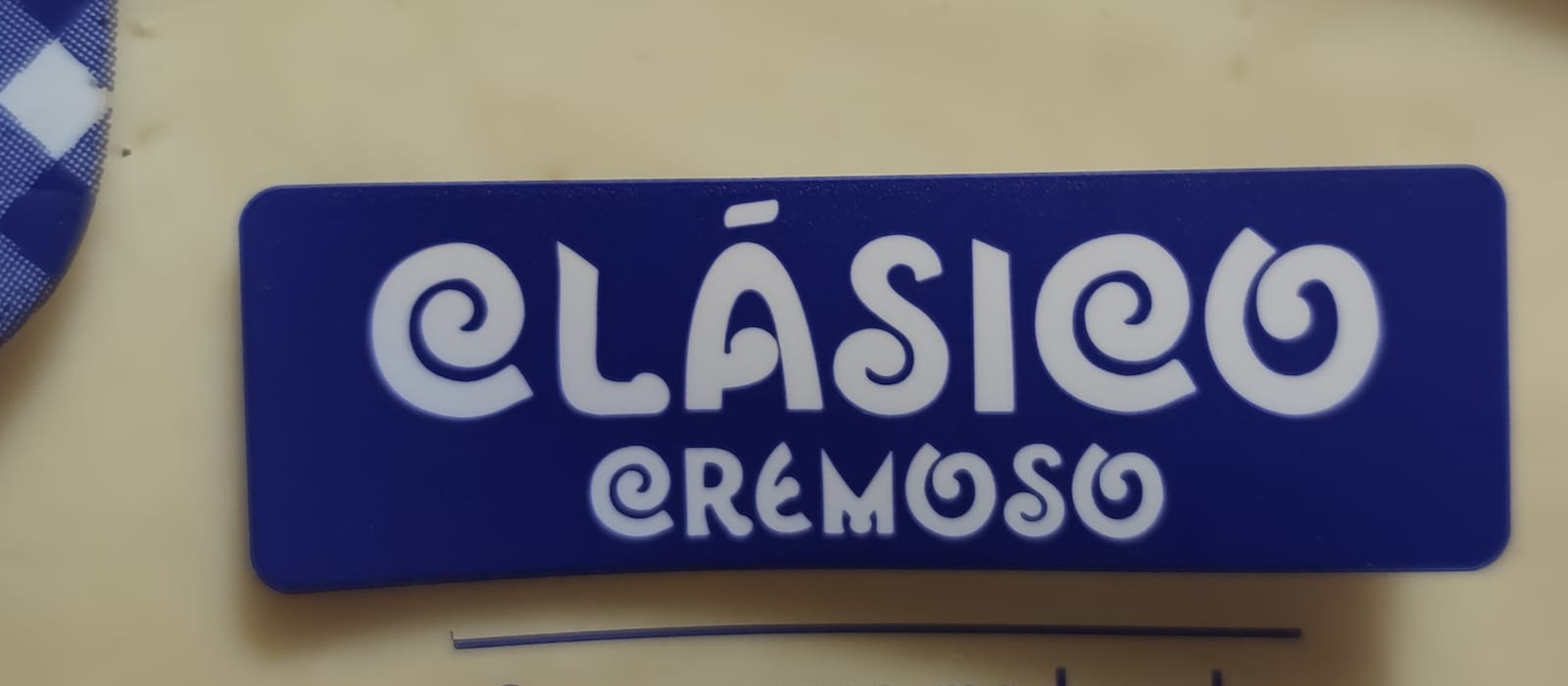
Commercial typography of Galician dairy products

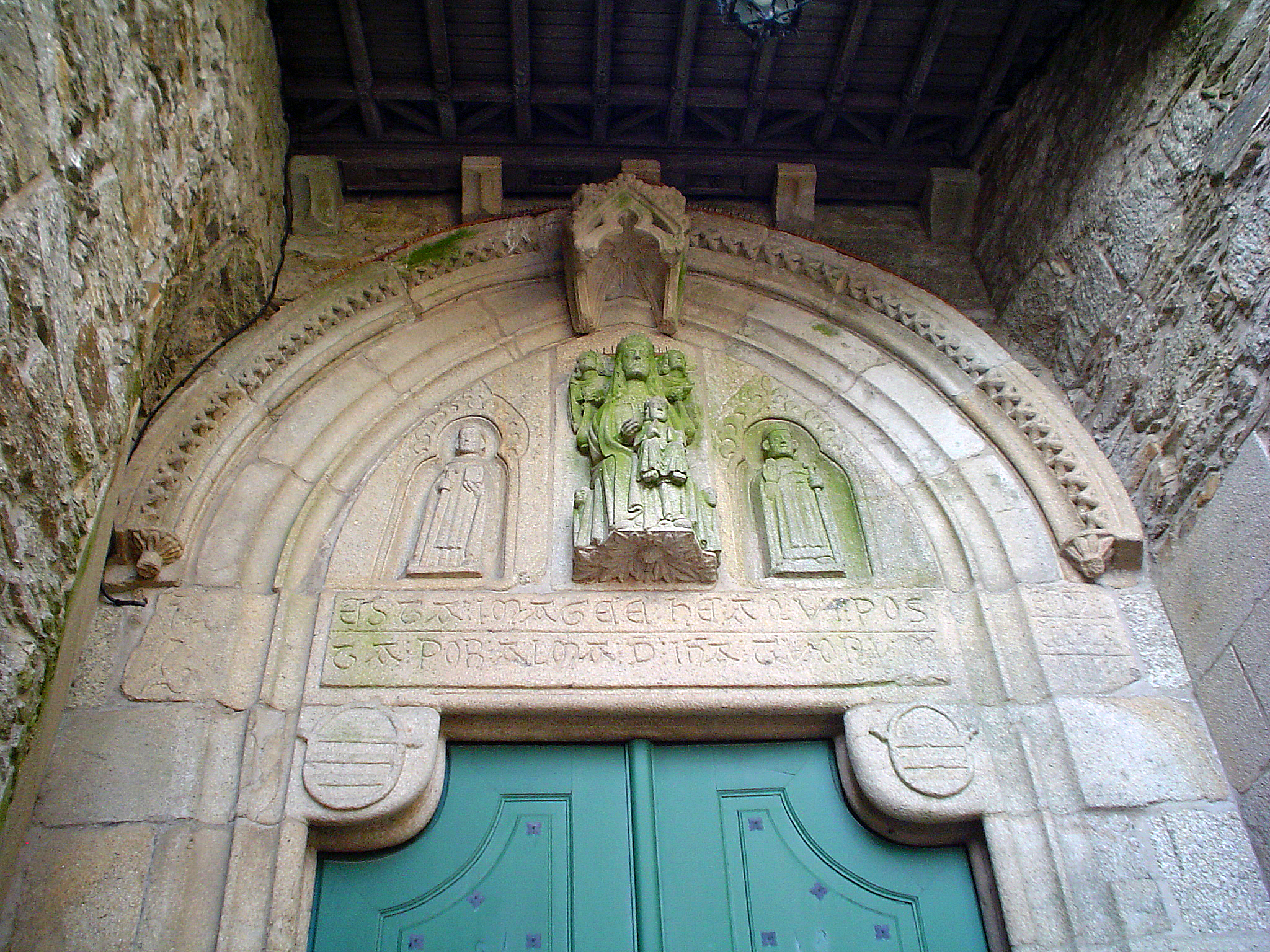
Gothic doorway of the small cemetery of Convent of San Domingos de Bonaval in Santiago de Compostela

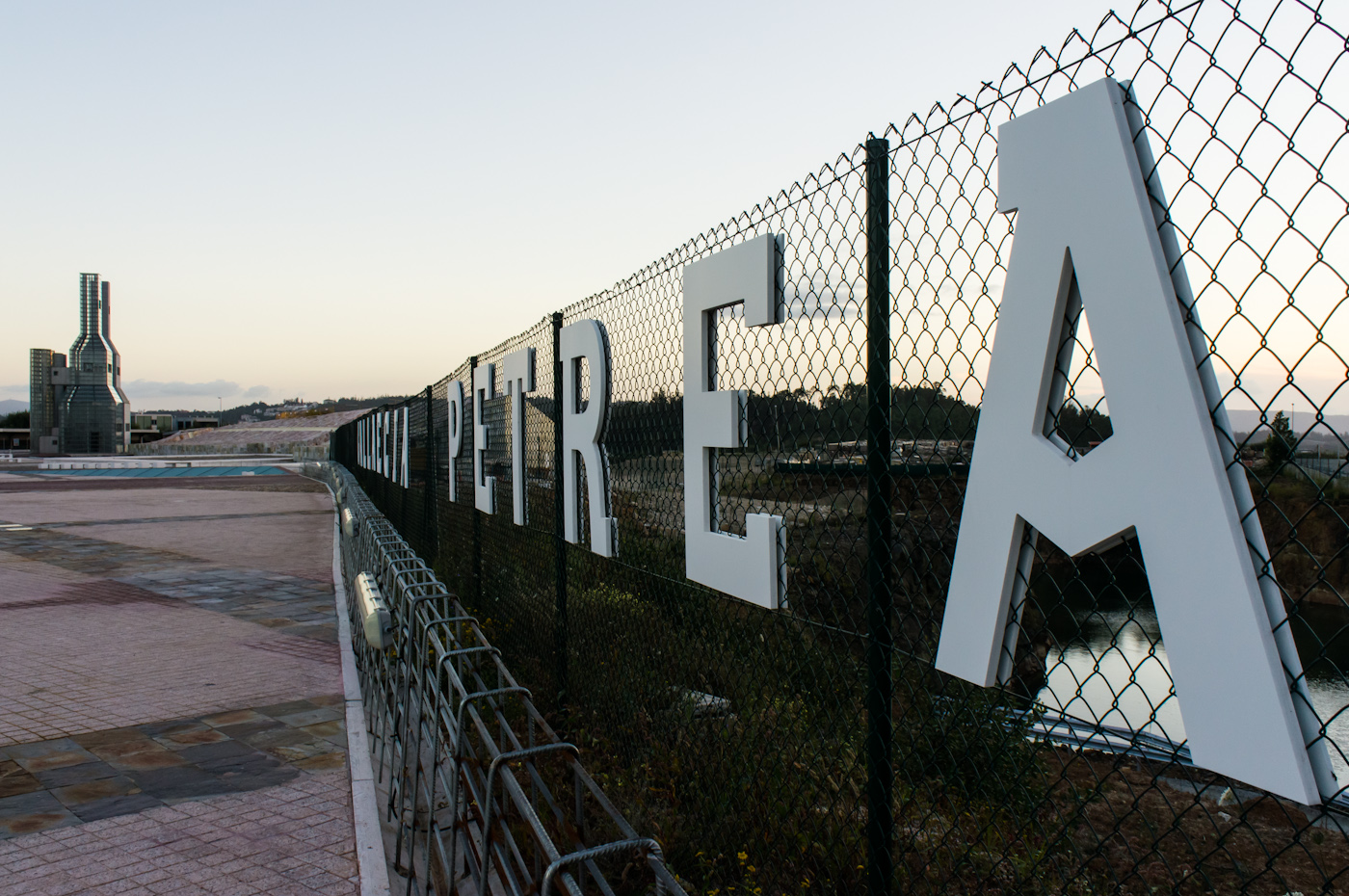
Letters in the City of Culture of Galicia in Gaiás, Santiago

On fabric research, Luís Seoane and Maria. E. Montero:

In Galicia, the collaborative work between Seoane and Mª Elena Montero is paradigmatic of a way of proceeding that will be recovered in the 2nd decade of the 21st century. Seoane designed the tapestry cards in Argentina and these were made in Sada by Montero, who managed to achieve the chromatic richness of the artist's paintings. It was a feminist and pioneering collaboration in the relationship between art, design and craftsmanship, a work of respect and common creativity, as Seoane insisted that the works be signed jointly, something extraordinary for the time. In these works, the tradition of tapestry and its relationship with painting is collected, as well as the history of Galicia, its legends and battles, from the Romanesque period to the current myth of shellfish gatherers, watering cans, milkmaids, in short, women as a central figure in Galicia's memory and fortress.

=== Buildings in Galicia with Renovadores' work ===
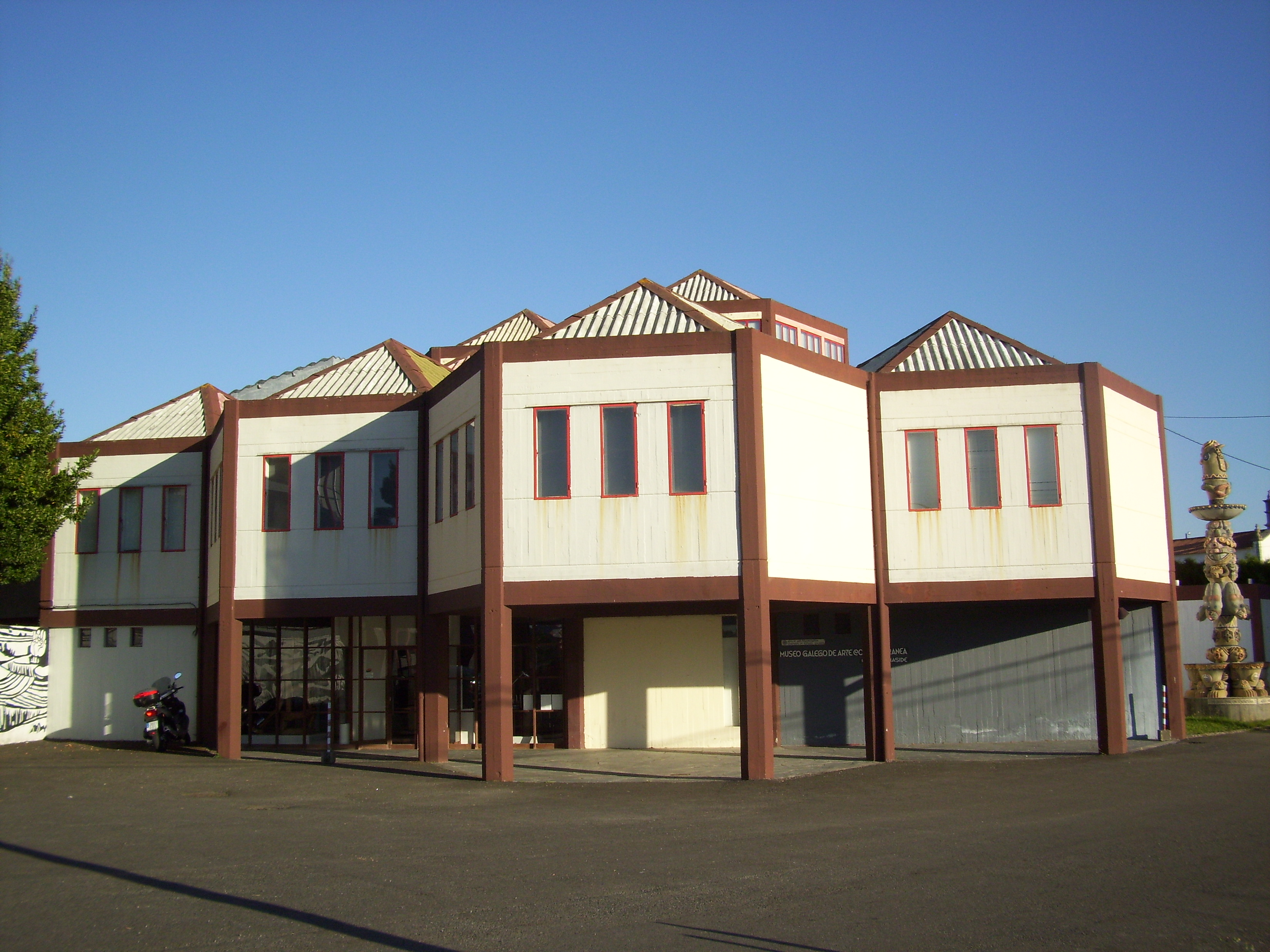
Museo Galego de Arte Contemporánea Carlos Maside, in Sada

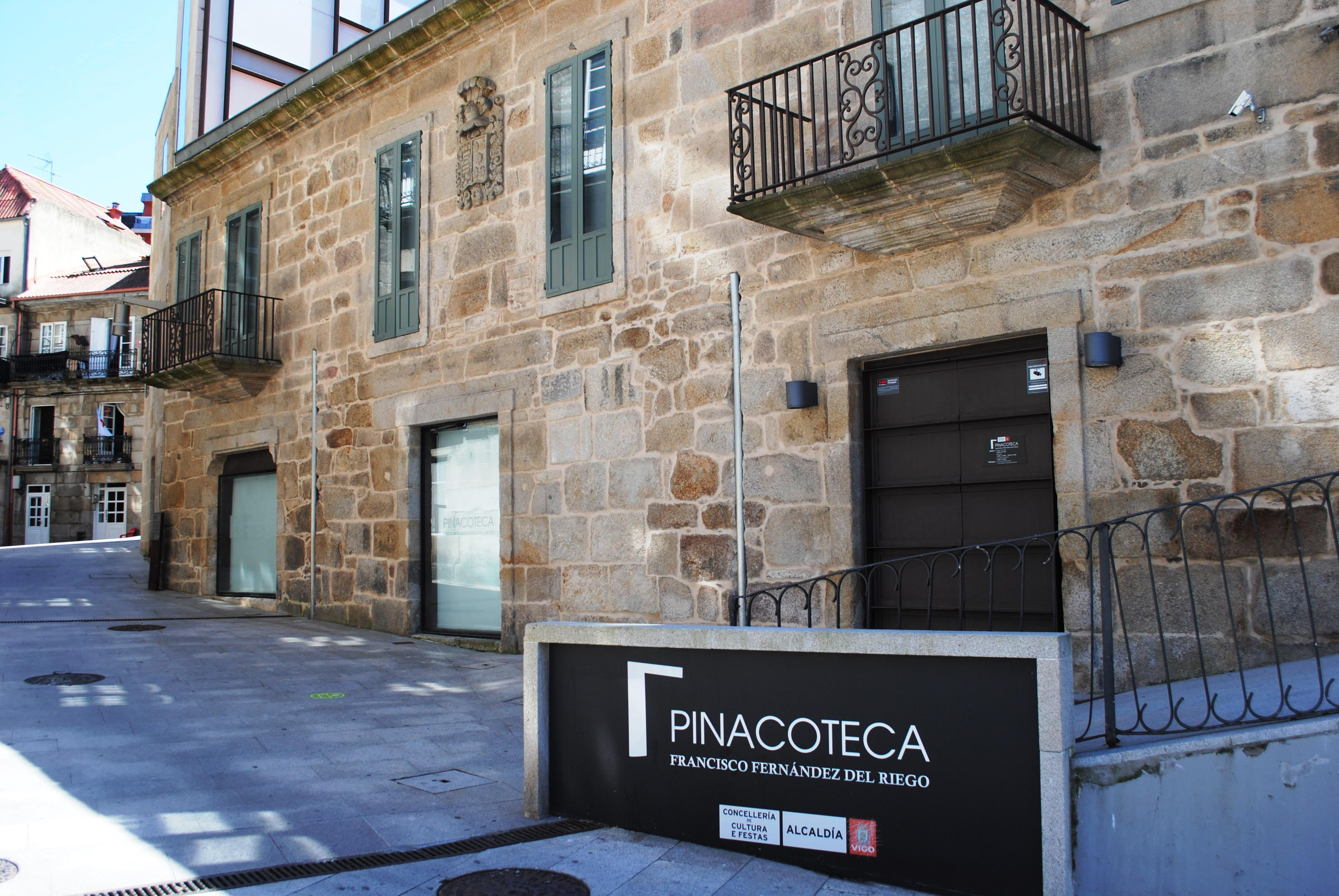
Pinacoteca Francisco Fernández del Riego, in Vigo

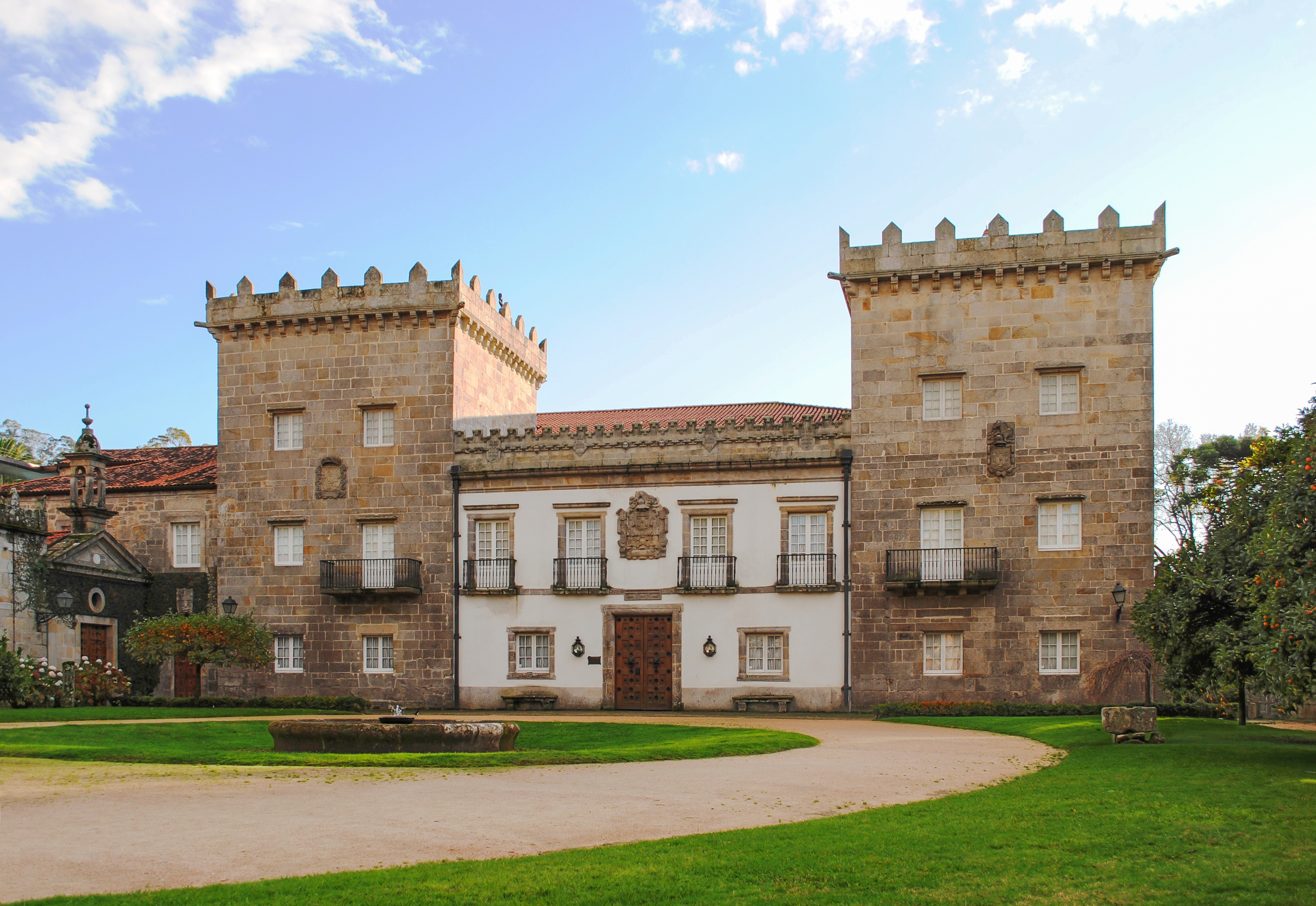
Pazo de Castrelos, Vigo

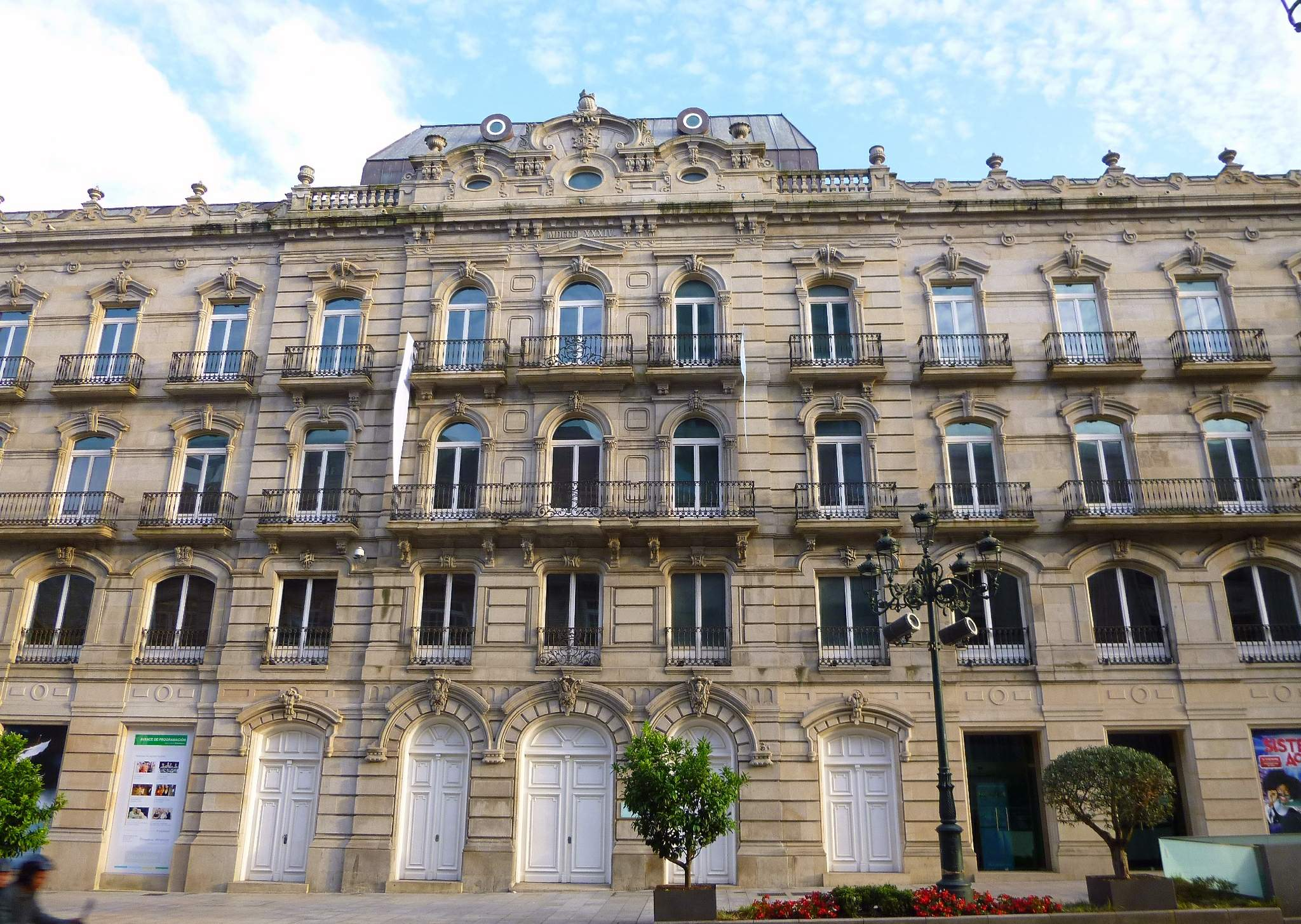
Centro Social Afundación, Vigo

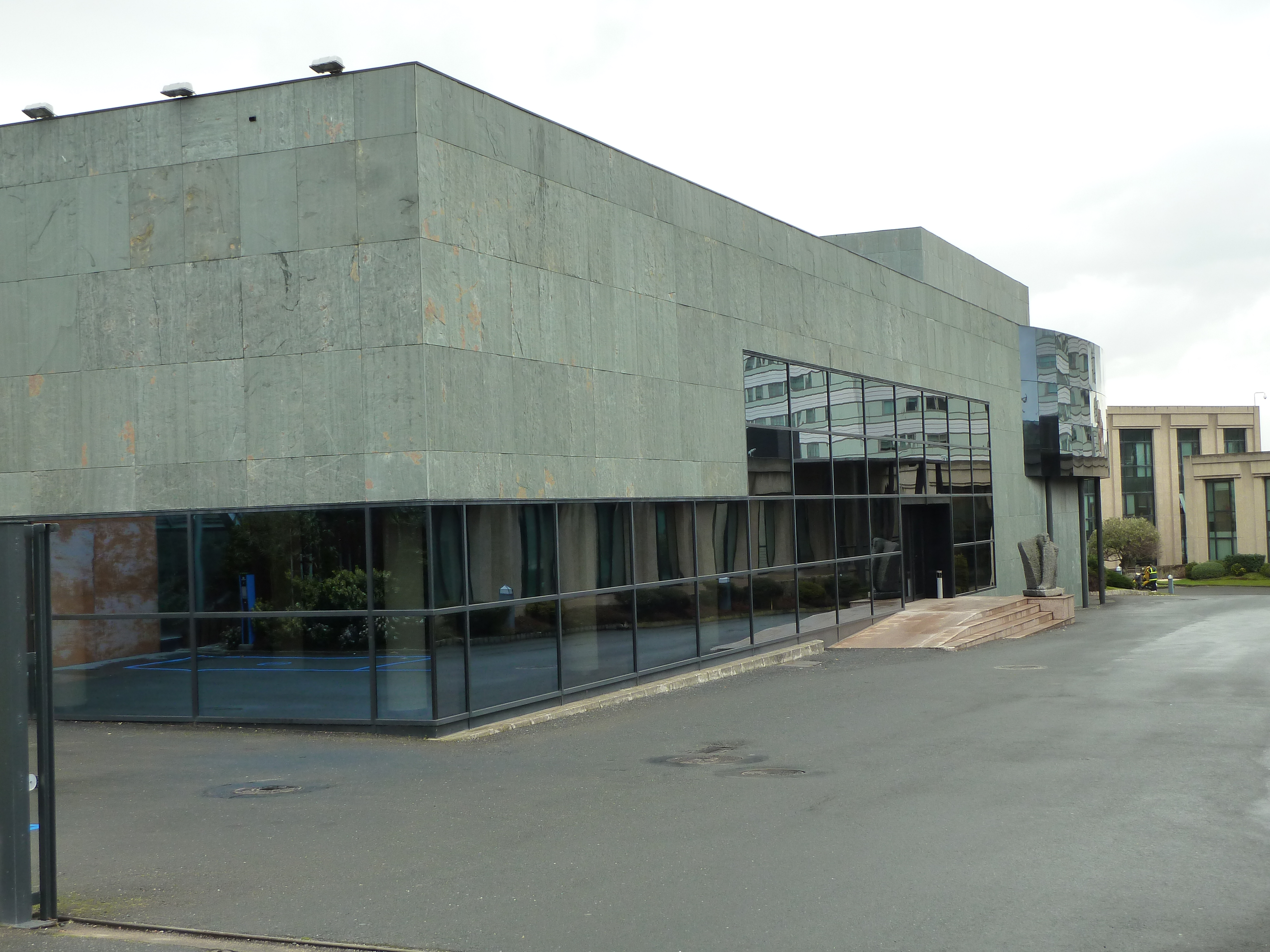
MACUF, A Coruña

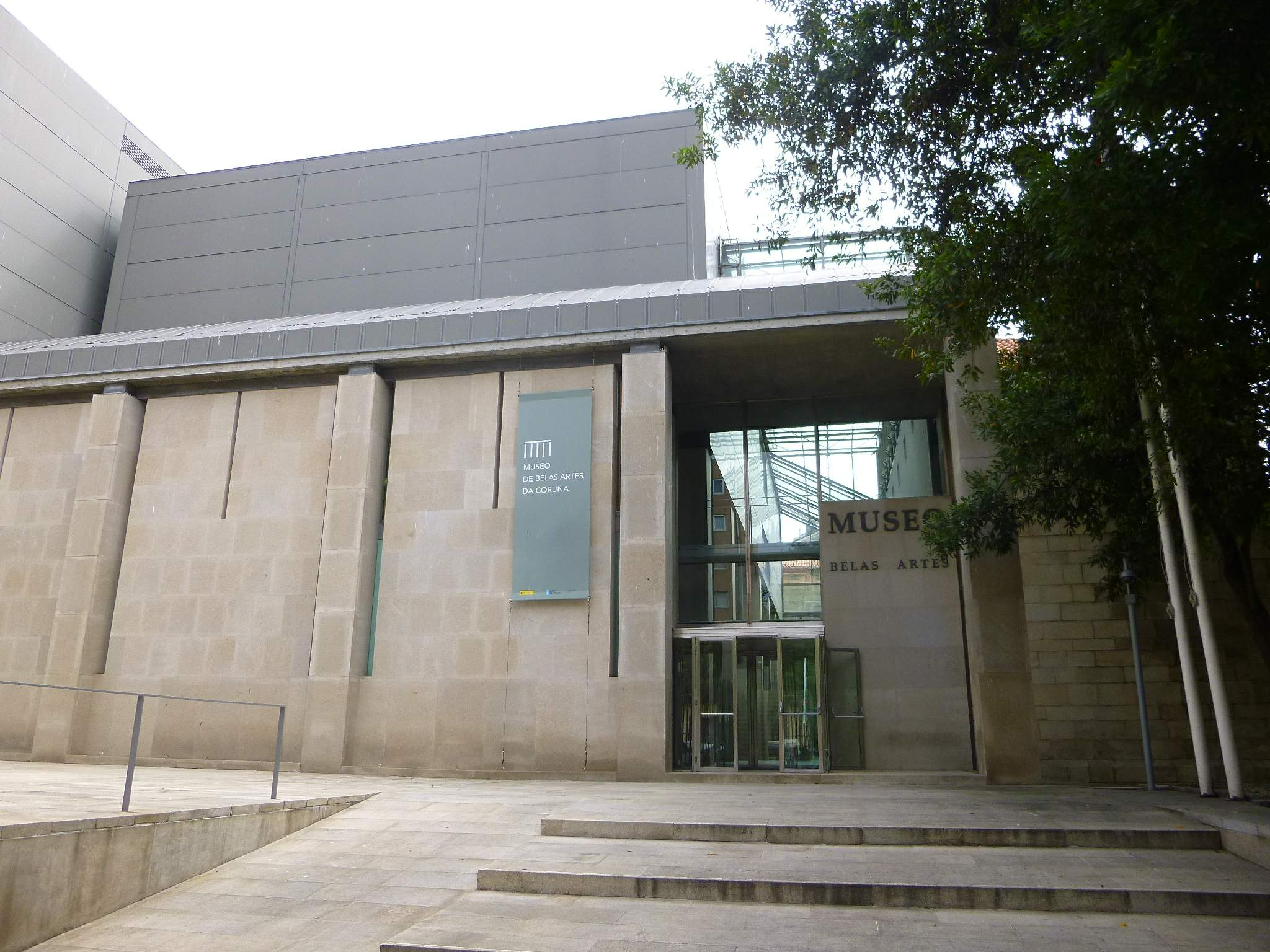
Museo de Belas Artes da Coruña, A Coruña

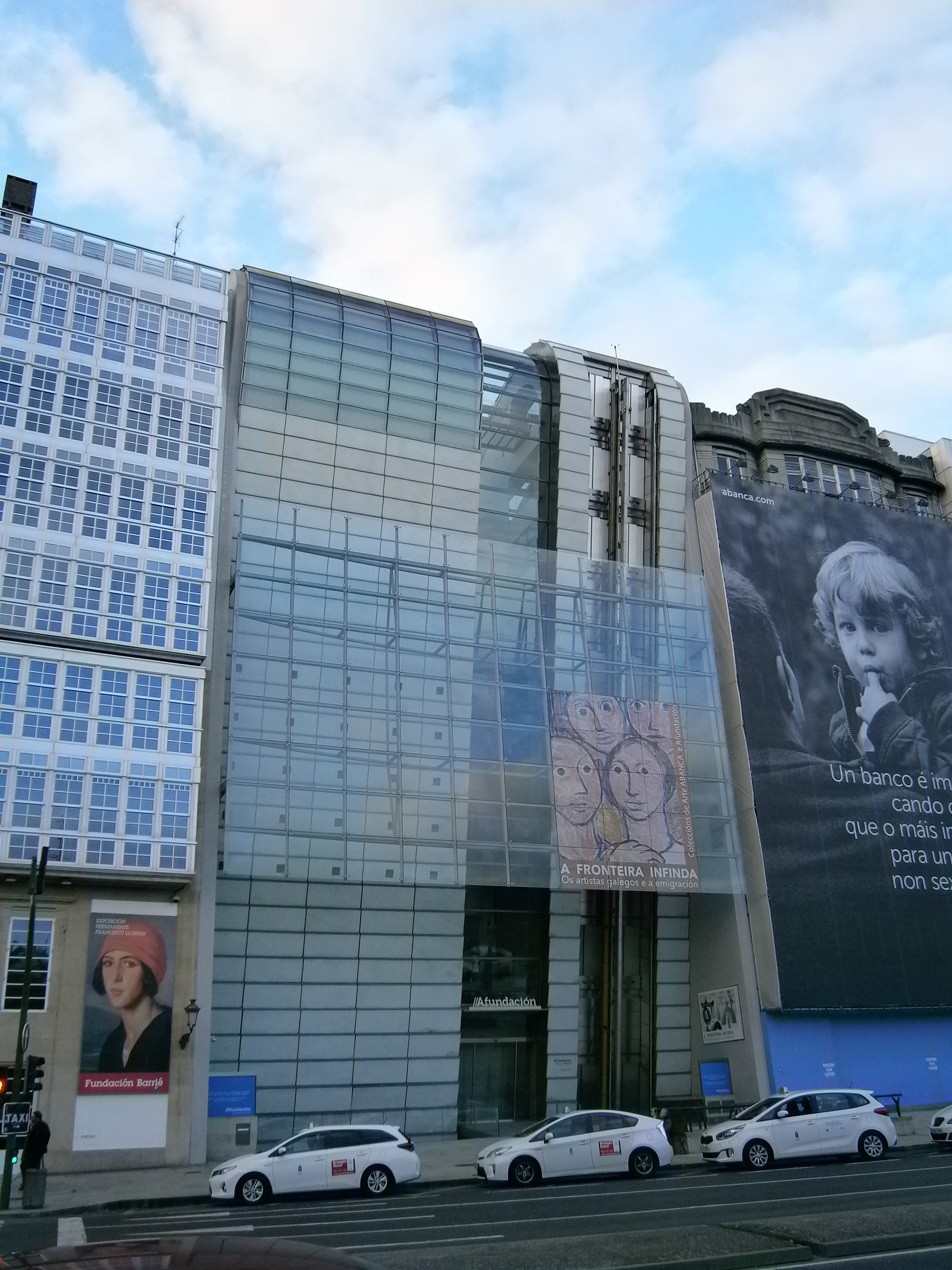
Afundación, A Coruña

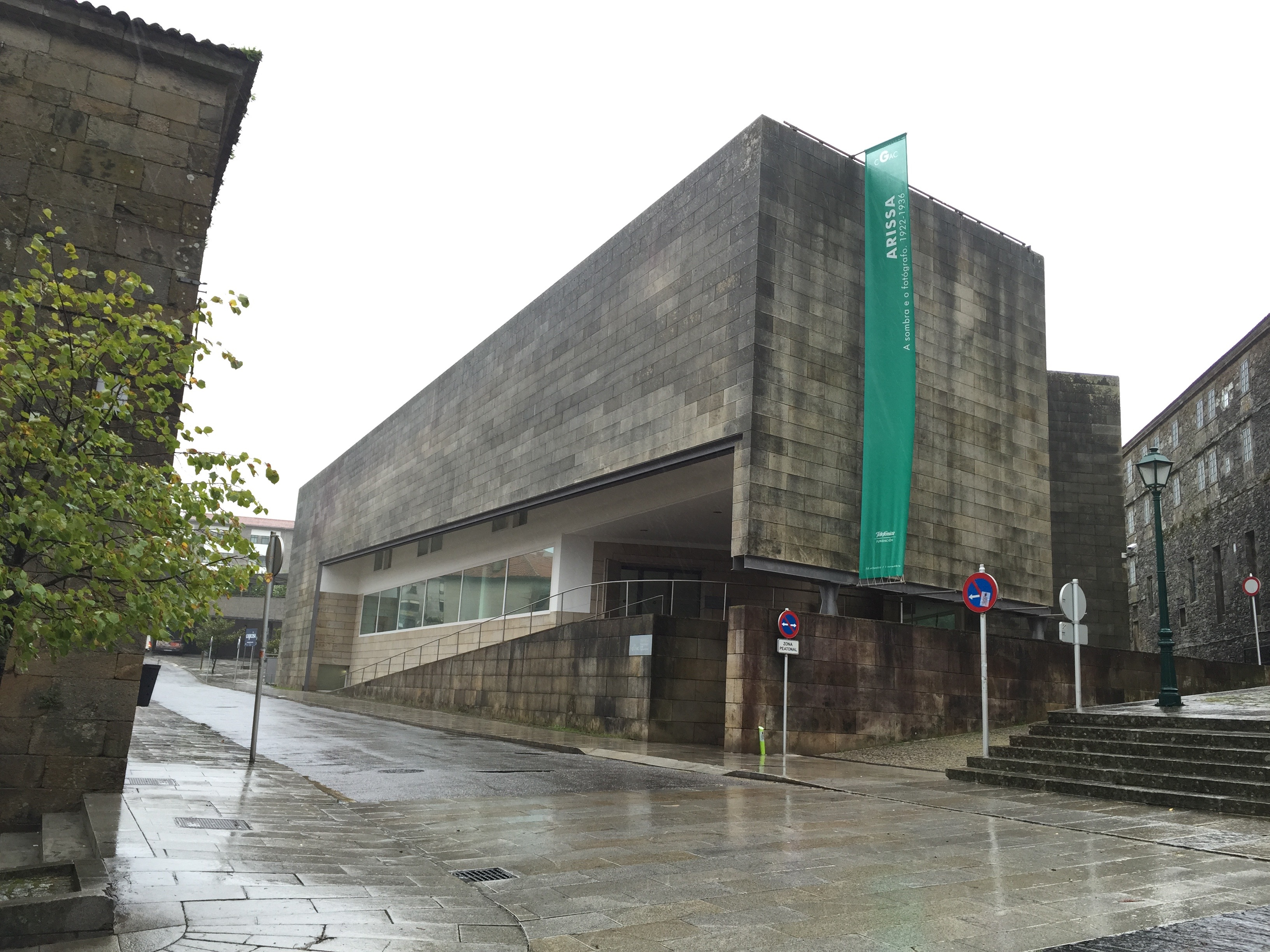
CGAC, Santiago de Compostela

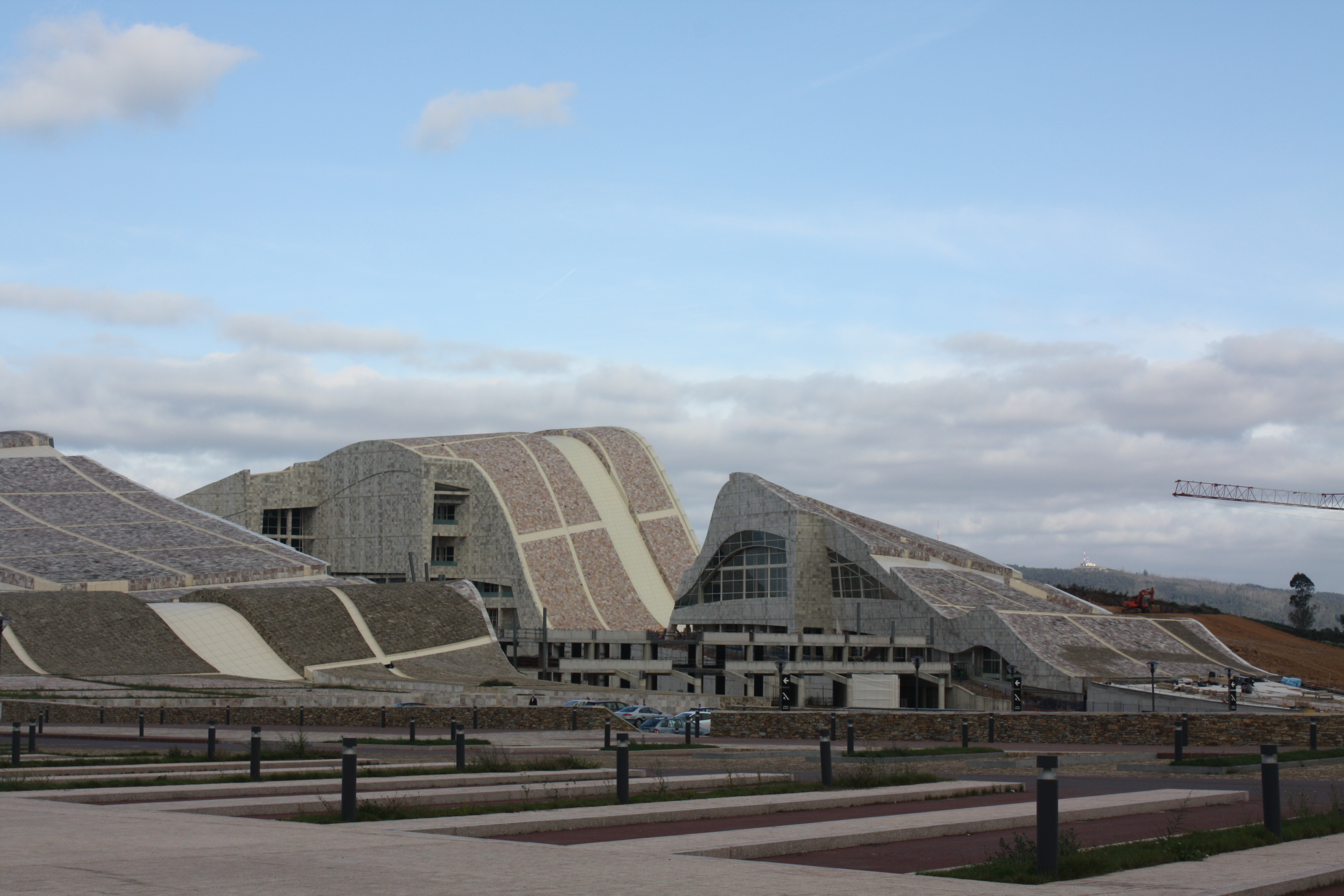
Cidade da Cultura, Santiago de Compostela

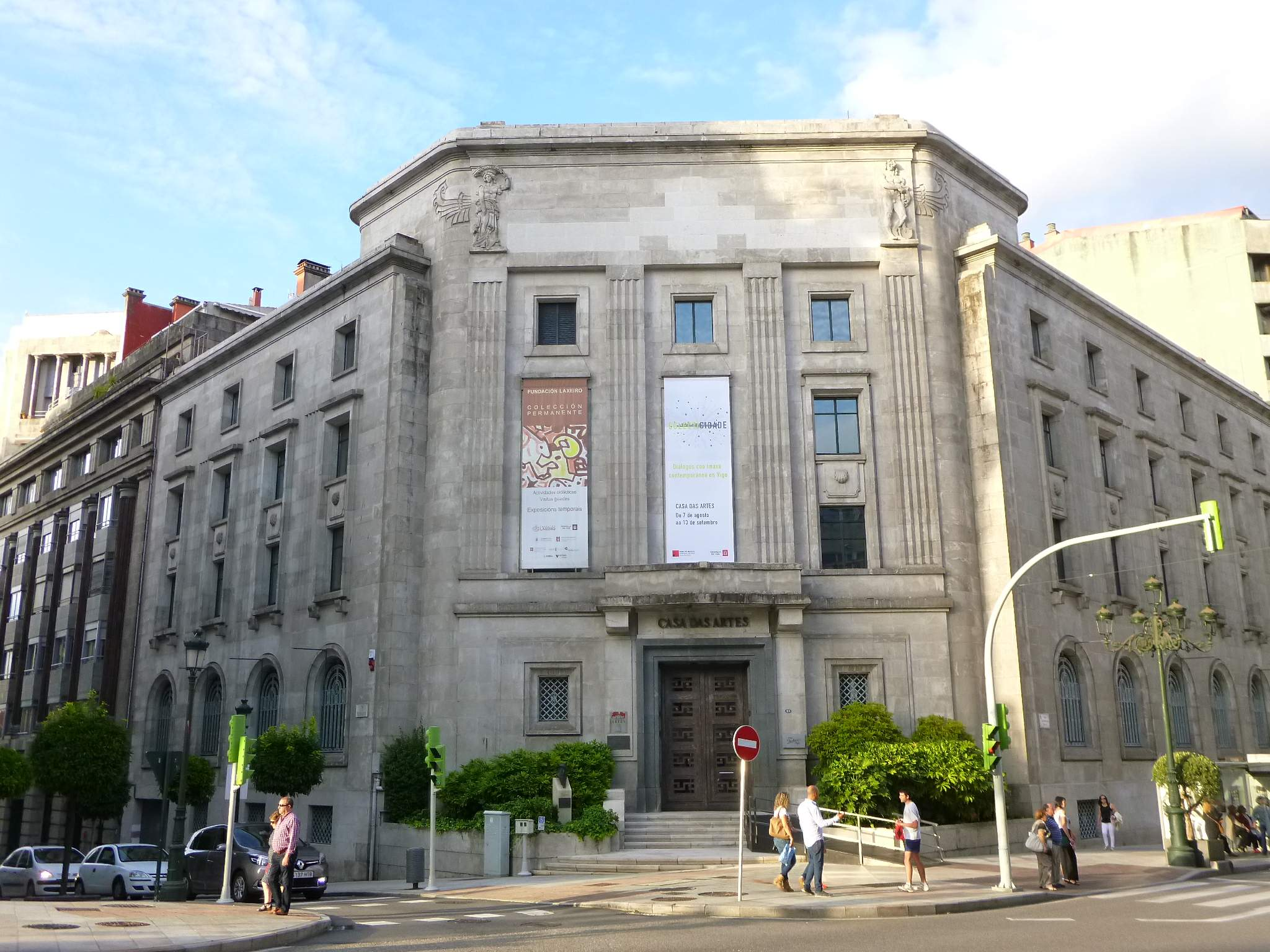
Casa das Artes, Fundación Laxeiro, Vigo

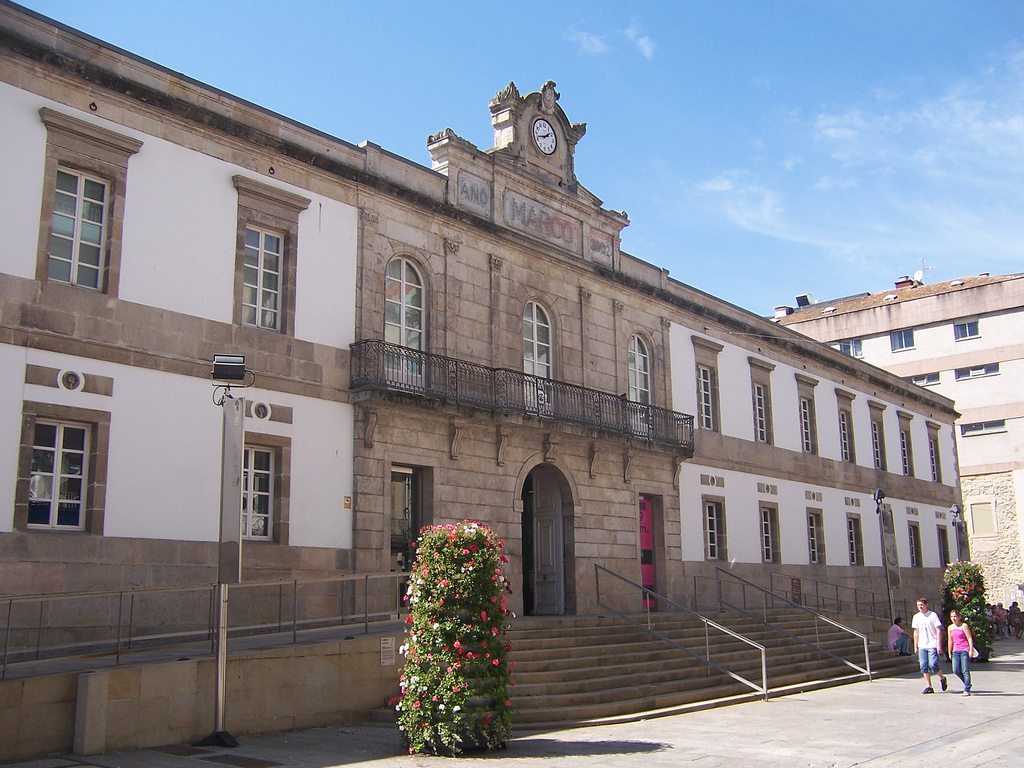
Museo de Arte Contemporánea, MARCO, Vigo

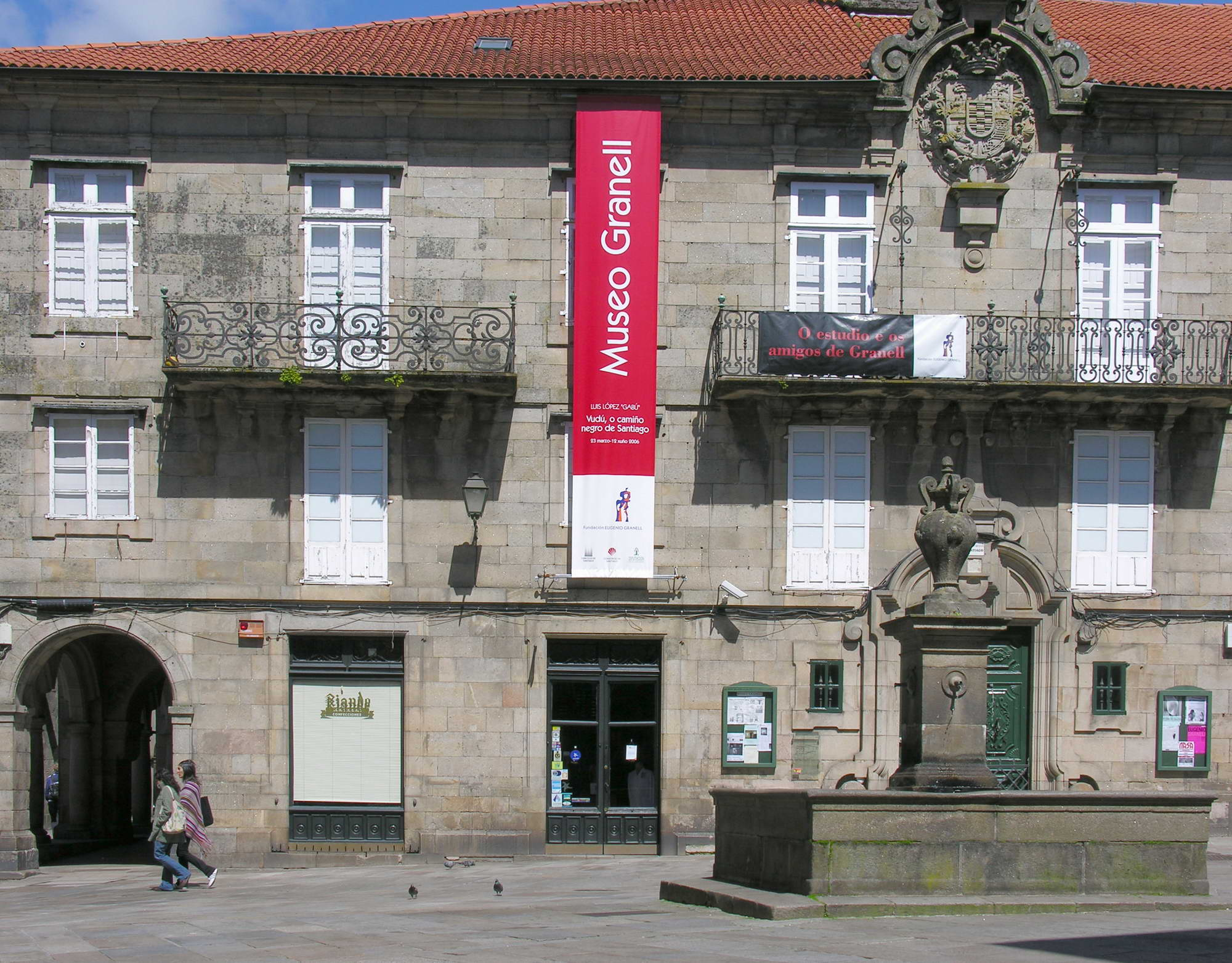
Museo Granell, in Toural Square, Santiago de Compostela

== Bibliography ==
- Quatro renovadores da arte galega. Souto. Colmeiro. Laxeiro. Seoane (1993). Consorcio da Cidade de Santiago de Compostela. ISBN 84-88484-09-7.
