= CD5L =

Protein-coding gene in humans

Identifiers
- Aliases: CD5L, AIM, API6, PRO229, SP-ALPHA, Spalpha, CT-2, hAIM, CD5 molecule like
- External IDs: OMIM: 602592; MGI: 1334419; GeneCards: CD5L

Gene location (Human)
Chr.	Chromosome 1 (human)
Band	1q23.1	Start	157,830,911 bp
Band	1q23.1	End	157,898,256 bp

Gene location (Mouse)
Chr.	Chromosome 3 (mouse)
Band	3|3 F1	Start	87,265,188 bp
Band	3|3 F1	End	87,278,380 bp
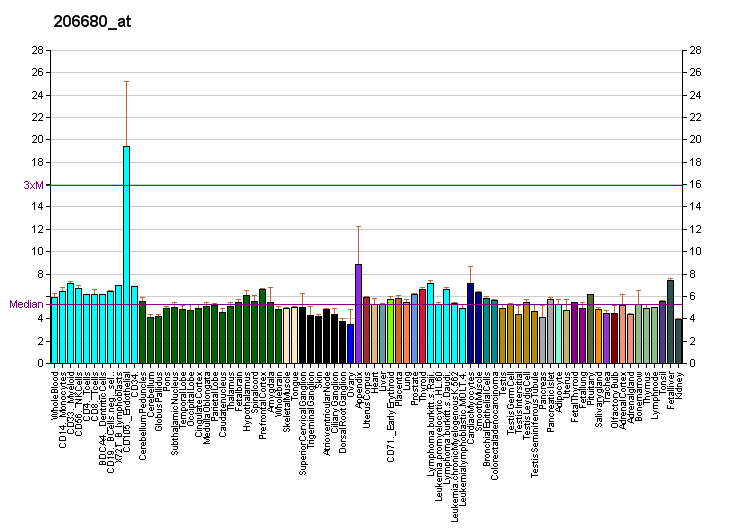
RNA expression pattern
Bgee	Human / Mouse (ortholog); Top expressed in: spleen; trabecular bone; liver; testicle; right lobe of liver; buccal mucosa cell; lymph node; bone marrow; bone marrow cell; placenta / Top expressed in: stroma of bone marrow; fetal liver hematopoietic progenitor cell; mesenteric lymph nodes; left lobe of liver; spleen; calvaria; tibiofemoral joint; granulocyte; human fetus; subcutaneous adipose tissue; More reference expression data
BioGPS	More reference expression data
Gene ontology
Molecular function	scavenger receptor activity
Cellular component	cytoplasm; extracellular region; extracellular exosome; blood microparticle; membrane; extracellular space; plasma membrane; cell surface
Biological process	cellular defense response; inflammatory response; receptor-mediated endocytosis; immune system process; apoptotic process; vesicle-mediated transport; regulation of complement activation; positive regulation of complement-dependent cytotoxicity; endocytosis
Sources:Amigo / QuickGO
Orthologs
Databases	NCBI: entry; OMA: entry
Species	Human	Mouse
Entrez	922	11801
Ensembl	ENSG00000073754	ENSMUSG00000015854
UniProt	O43866	Q9QWK4
RefSeq (mRNA)	NM_005894; NM_001347698	NM_009690
RefSeq (protein)	NP_001334627; NP_005885	NP_033820
Location (UCSC)	Chr 1: 157.83 – 157.9 Mb	Chr 3: 87.27 – 87.28 Mb
PubMed search
- Wikidata
View/Edit Human	View/Edit Mouse

CD5 antigen-like is a protein (also known as AIM, for apoptosis inhibitor of macrophage) that in humans is encoded by the CD5L gene. It is expressed by macrophages. It regulates immune responses and inflammation. It plays a crucial role in key intracellular processes like lipid metabolism and apoptosis.

== Gene ==
AIM, also known as apoptosis inhibitor of macrophage, is a 40 kDa protein encoded by the CD5L gene. Its expression is predominantly driven by tissue-resident macrophages via transcriptional activation of nuclear receptors such as LXR and RXR, and/or the transcription factor MAFB. Expression is further regulated by GSK3 through activation of STAT3, which influences CD5L promoter activity.

== Structure ==
AIM belongs to the scavenger receptor cysteine-rich (SRCR) superfamily and contains three SRCR domains. In serum, AIM forms complexes with IgM pentamers, which prevents its renal excretion and enables sustained high circulating levels. While the IgM-bound form is functionally inactive, AIM dissociates under pathological conditions to perform biological functions involved in disease resolution. The binding between AIM and IgM-Fc is of low affinity and resembles an antibody–antigen interaction, although the precise molecular binding mode remains unclear.

== Tissue distribution ==
A 2019 study reported that AIM is more widely expressed in dogs than previously described in humans and mice. In healthy adult Beagles, AIM was detected in tissue macrophages of the spleen, liver, lungs, lymph nodes, and proximal tubules of the kidney. Expression was also found in circulating monocytes, B lymphocytes, and certain microvascular endothelial cells. Additionally, early-stage monocyte progenitor-like cells in the bone marrow expressed AIM.

== Functions ==
AIM is involved in a wide range of physiological functions, including lipid metabolism, inflammation, tissue repair, and autoimmune disease, among others. Many of its effects are mediated by regulating macrophage function. The precise effects of the protein depend on the receptors with which it interacts. Through the CD36 receptor, AIM regulates autophagy of macrophages and promotes lipolysis in adipocytes. In contrast, heterodimerization with p19 can promote cell proliferation and STAT5 activation. AIM generally promotes inflammation in tissues such as liver and vasculature, and therefore tends to worsen conditions such as atherosclerosis and fatty liver disease. However, accumulation of AIM at the surface of tumor cells leads to complement activation and killing of the tumor cell, at least in the liver, suggesting a role in inhibiting liver cancer.

== Clinical significance ==
AIM has been found to increase in autoimmune diseases, directly targeting liver cells in liver cancer and promoting cell clearance in acute kidney injury. It has also been found to contribute to arteriosclerosis and cardiovascular events, and to aggravate inflammatory reactions in lung diseases and sepsis.

=== In autoimmune diseases ===
Elevated AIM expression in autoimmune diseases serves as a potential biomarker, yet its role and mechanism remain unclear. In ALS, secondary progressive multiple sclerosis, rheumatoid arthritis, and osteoarthritis, AIM levels are elevated, making it a sensitive biomarker for disease activity. In knee-OA patients, AIM in CD14+ macrophages suggests a potential role in enhancing synovial macrophage survival and promoting arthritis. In lupus, AIM concentration correlates with disease activity and inflammatory markers, decreasing after effective treatment. In psoriasis, AIM may contribute to the inflammatory environment by inhibiting macrophage apoptosis. In Crohn's disease, AIM secretion by active macrophages causes intestinal inflammation, aiding in distinguishing it from other intestinal diseases. Though AIM levels in Crohn's disease show no correlation with disease activity or clinical characteristics, the increment of AIM may contribute to its pathogenesis by inhibiting macrophage apoptosis and sustaining inflammation.

=== In cardiopulmonary diseases ===
The role of AIM in cardiovascular and pulmonary diseases centers around inflammation, inhibiting macrophage apoptosis, and enhancing inflammatory responses. In cardiovascular disease, AIM exacerbates metabolic disorders and atherosclerosis, contributing to diabetes mellitus and cardiovascular events. AIM is highly expressed in foamy macrophages within atherosclerotic plaques, promoting macrophage survival and inflammatory responses. AIM deficient mice showed improved outcomes after myocardial infarction, including increased survival, reduced heart rupture, and altered macrophage profiles. In pulmonary diseases, AIM serves as a valuable biomarker for differentiating bacterial from viral infections and predicting mortality in pneumonia. In lung injury scenarios, AIM influences inflammatory signals and bacterial clearance.

=== Dual role in liver inflammatory damage ===
AIM plays a dual role in liver dynamics. In lipid metabolism, it contributes to lipolysis-related inflammation, while in the liver's microenvironment, it counters TGFβ1's pro-fibrotic effects during liver disease. This adaptive response aims to mitigate inflammatory signaling and fibrosis. In liver injury models, AIM exhibits a protective role against fibrosis, influencing injury prevention, immune cell infiltration, and a shift in macrophage phenotypes. However, while AIM from Kupffer macrophages triggers complement-dependent cytotoxicity, inducing tumor cell death, its heightened expression in hepatocellular carcinoma (HCC) is linked to aggressive tumor characteristics, enhanced proliferation, and resistance to apoptosis.

AIM's distinct origins, whether from the bloodstream or hepatic macrophages, contribute differently to liver health. Circulating AIM inhibits obesity and fatty liver disease, while non-circulating AIM from macrophages impedes HCC development by directly targeting cancerous liver cells. The interaction with scavenger receptors further refines AIM's impact, triggering complement-dependent cytotoxicity most effectively in the liver. In drug-induced liver injury, AIM's increased expression contributes to mitochondrial oxidative stress, and the loss of circulating AIM in acute and chronic liver failure correlates with multiple organ failures, highlighting its broader implications in systemic inflammation.

=== Dual role in kidney function ===
In serum, AIM, released from the IgM pentamer, serves diverse purposes, including its involvement in acute kidney injury (AKI). A 2016 study published in Nature Medicine highlighted the role of apoptosis inhibitor of macrophage in promoting recovery from AKI in mice. AIM, increased during AKI, binds to kidney injury molecule (KIM)-1, facilitating the clearance of cellular debris in the kidney and aiding tissue repair. AIM-deficient mice with AKI displayed impaired debris clearance and increased mortality. Treating AKI mice with recombinant AIM improved renal pathology, offering a potential basis for novel AKI therapies.

In nephropathies, AIM demonstrates a dual role with complex consequences. In IgA nephropathy (IgAN) models, recombinant AIM restores glomerular IgM/IgG co-deposition, suggesting its involvement in kidney damage. In IgAN patients, urinary AIM levels correlate with renal inflammation indicators, emphasizing its multifaceted role. AIM, originating from infiltrating macrophages, becomes an additional source of urinary AIM, challenging the perception that serum-free AIM is the sole contributor.

=== Obesity ===
Research conducted by researchers at the University of Tokyo in 2011 revealed that AIM increases in blood with obesity progression, promoting lipolysis in adipose tissue. This response is crucial for recruiting adipose tissue macrophages, facilitated by AIM-induced chemokine production through toll-like receptor 4 (TLR4) activation. Administering recombinant AIM to TLR4-deficient mice induces lipolysis without chemokine production, preventing inflammatory macrophage infiltration into adipose tissue and mitigating obesity-related inflammation, insulin resistance, and glucose intolerance. These findings suggest that targeting AIM could be a therapeutic approach for preventing obesity-related metabolic disorders.

== In cats ==
A 2016 study attributed the high susceptibility of house cats to kidney disease to the inability of feline AIM protein to enter the urine. In cats—including domestic cats, lions, and tigers—AIM is very tightly bound to IgM pentamers in the bloodstream. This prevents its passage into the nephrons and impairs the clearance of dead cells following renal injury. In contrast, AIM in humans and mice dissociates from IgM under pathological conditions, enabling tissue repair. Mice genetically engineered to express feline AIM in place of their native CD5L exhibited increased mortality following acute kidney injury. Similar patterns have been reported in human patients with chronic kidney disease, in that AIM dissociation from pentameric IgM is positively correlated with prognosis after hemodialysis initiation.

Two genotypes of feline AIM have been identified. The common variant encodes three SRCR domains, similar to other mammals, while a less frequent allele encodes four SRCR domains due to a duplication. Although this variant binds IgM with reduced affinity, it still fails to dissociate following kidney injury.

A 2015 patent described the use of recombinant feline and murine AIM administered by injection in cats as an experimental treatment for kidney injury.

Therapeutic strategies based on AIM, including injectable AIM and small molecules that promote its release from IgM, have been proposed for use in both cats and humans. In 2022, a commercial cat supplement branded as "AIM30" was released, claiming to enhance AIM activity via a proprietary "A-30" amino acid, reportedly developed with input from researchers involved in AIM studies. However, at the time there was no evidence supporting the existence of such an amino acid in the scientific literature or among the product's listed ingredients. Unverified claims of AIM injections undergoing clinical trials in cats also circulated in 2024.

In February 2026, the Miyazaki group published a preliminary trial of intravenous recombinant AIM (rAIM) in cats with IRIS stage 3 CKD and elevated serum indoxyl sulfate. 6 cats received mouse rAIM (rmAIM), 5 received feline rAIM (rfAIM), and 15 served as the control group. As 360 days 83% of the rmAIM group, 80% of the rfAIM group, and 20% of the control group survived. It was additionally found that none of the 9 cats with IS < 5 µg/mL in the separate observational group had died.
