= Cd1-restricted T cell =

Unconventional T cell

Cd1-restricted T cells are part of the unconventional T cell family, they are stimulated by exposure to CD1^{+} antigen presenting cells (APCs). Many CD1-restricted T cells are rapidly stimulated to carry out helper and effector functions upon interaction with CD1-expressing antigen-presenting cells. CD1-restricted T cells regulate host defence, antitumor immunity and the balance between tolerance and autoimmunity.

In general, CD1-restricted T cells are divided according to their CD1 molecule. Humans express four CD1 isoforms divided in 2 groups:

- group 1 CD1 (CD1a, CD1b, and CD1c)
- group 2 CD1 (CD1d).

There are several ways for a T cell to recognize CD1-antigen complexes: αβ T-cell receptors, δγ T-cell receptors, and CD36 family members are all known to be able to make a T cell CD1-restricted.

== Group 1 CD1-restricted T cells ==
Group 1 CD1-restricted T cells express diverse αβ T-cell receptors (TCRs). They can undergo clonal expansion in the periphery after recognition of stimulatory self-lipids or exogenous lipid antigens derived from bacteria. CD1–restricted T cells produce T_{H}1, IFN-γ and TNF-α cytokines and are cytolytic. They can induce TNF-α dependent dentritic cells maturation. Many group 1 CD1–restricted T cells are autoreactive, and autoreactivity is enhanced by stimulation through pattern recognition receptors (PRRs). CD1a-restricted T cells are among the most frequent self-reactive CD1-restricted T cells in peripheral blood. Moreover, they are common in the skin. Skin CD1a-restricted T cells become activated when in contact with CD1a expressed by Langerhans cells. Upon activation, they produce IFN-𝛾, IL-2, and IL-22, a cytokine with suspected roles in skin immunity. CD1a-restricted T cells are unique in the way that their TCR can directly recognize the CD1a molecule without corecognition of a lipid antigen.

Self-reactive CD1b-restricted T cells can acquire the phenotype of T helper 17 (T_{H}17) cells and recruit neutrophils. CD1b is expressed at high levels on myeloid dendritic cells in blood and in tissues, and on certain macrophages and other immune cells in the periphery. TCD1b presents many mycobacterial lipid antigens, including glucose monomycolate (GMM) and free mycolic acid (MA) to human T cell clones. The responding T cell clones show effector functions that are consistent with a role in host protection, including Th1 skewed responses, cytotoxicity toward infected cells, and lack of response to uninfected cells or self-lipids. Germline-Encoded Mycolyl lipid reactive (GEM) T cells are defined by the expression of nearly invariant TRAV1-2/TRAJ9^{+} TCR α chains and CD4^{+}. LDN5-like T cells, named after the clone LDN5, use TRAV17 or TRBV4-1, but have highly variable joining regions and do not seem to preferentially use any particular J segments. LDN5-like cells show conservation in the TCR β chain outside the CDR3.

CD1c autoreactive cells has been identified to play a role in tumor detection. CD1–restricted T cells can kill immature dentritic cells that are infected.

== CD1d restricted natural killer T cells or group 2 CD1-restricted T cells ==
Natural killer T (NKT) cells represent unusual cells of the innate immune system because they express a surface receptor that is generated by somatic DNA rearrangement, a hallmark of cells of the adaptive immune system. A hallmark of NKT cells is their capacity to rapidly produce copious amounts of cytokines upon antigenic stimulation, including interferon (IFN)-γ, interleukin (IL)-4, tumor necrosis factor (TNF)- α, and IL-2, which endows these cells with potent immunomodulatory activities. As a result, NKT cells are involved in the regulation of various immune responses, including infectious diseases, tumors, transplants, allergic reactions, autoimmune diseases, and inflammatory diseases. These properties of NKT cells have been utilized in vaccine development and immunotherapy using animal models of infection, tumor metastasis, and autoimmunity.

CD1d-restricted NKT cells contribute to host defence by influencing the function of macrophages, dentritic cells, B cells and Natural Killer cells. They also contribute to tumor immunosurveillance and can mediate tumor rejection via interleukin 12 (IL-12) production, Natural Killer or T cell activation, or direct cytolysis. CD1d-restricted NKT cells are divided into 2 groups.

=== Type I NKT cells ===
Type I NKT cells are also called 'invariant NKT cells' or 'iNKT cells', they express an invariant TCRα chain and a limited, but not invariant, range of TCRβ chains. Type I NKT cells are less frequent in humans than in mice (1–3% of T cells in most mouse tissues, 50% in mouse liver and bone marrow, and approximately 0.1% of T cells in human blood). All type I NKT cells recognize the marine sponge-derived glycolipid, α-galactosylceramide (α-GalCer). After the encounter with the antigen Type I NKT cells rapidly become effector cells (minutes to hours) and produce many cytokines. These T cells also have a cytotoxic activity against CD1d^{+} tumor targets. Furthermore, type I NKT cells upregulate the costimulatory receptor CD154 (CD40 ligand), which, in conjunction with their cytokine production, potently activates DCs to increase expression of the costimulatory molecules CD80 and CD86 and produce interleukin 12. This leads to a more efficient presentation of antigen to MHC-restricted adaptive T cells, activation of NK cells and enhanced B cell responses. Thus, NKT cells can promote downstream innate and adaptive immune responses and, in turn, enhance protection against infection and cancer. Human iNKT cells can be subdivided into subpopulations according to the produced cytokines and the expression of certain transcription factors. iNKT1 cells producing large amounts of IFNγ and a little IL-4, iNKT2 cells producing large amounts of IL-4, and iNKT17 cells secreting IL-17. A special iNKT cell population called iNKT10 has been identified in adipose tissue, which relies on the expression of the transcription factor E4BP4 for its role in maintaining adipose tissue homeostasis.

=== Type II NKT cells ===
Type II NKT are also called 'diverse NKT cells', they use αβ TCRs that do not conform to the TCR motifs described above. Their TCR sequence is more variable than iNKT cell. cells Type II NKT cells recognize CD1d but lack the highly conserved TCRα chain and reactivity to α-GalCer that classify type I NKT cells. Some type II NKT cells recognize the mammalian glycolipid sulfatide (produced at high concentrations in neuroendocrine tissue) phospholipid antigen lysophosphatidylcholine and some other phospholipid, and lysophospholipid antigens, including phosphatidylglycerol, and phosphatidylinositol of microbial and mammalian origin. They can also sense gene products of hepatitis B virus by detecting lysophosphatidylethanolamine generated through the cleavage of phosphatidylethanolamine by virus-induced phospholipases. Even non-lipidic small molecules, such as PPBF (phenyl 2,2,4,6,7-pentamethyldihydrobenzofuran-5-sulfonate), are antigenic for some type II NKT cells. Thus, type II NKT cells seem to recognize diverse antigens presented by CD1d and given that these cells seem to be more abundant than type I NKT cells in humans, it is important to understand their roles and therapeutic potential.
