= MARCO =

Protein-coding gene in the species Homo sapiens

Identifiers
- Aliases: MARCO, SCARA2, macrophage receptor with collagenous structure, SR-A6
- External IDs: OMIM: 604870; MGI: 1309998; GeneCards: MARCO
Available structures
PDB	Ortholog search: PDBe RCSB
PDB	List of PDB id codes 2OY3, 2OYA

Gene location (Human)
Chr.	Chromosome 2 (human)
Band	2q14.2	Start	118,942,194 bp
Band	2q14.2	End	118,994,660 bp

Gene location (Mouse)
Chr.	Chromosome 1 (mouse)
Band	1|1 E2.3	Start	120,402,267 bp
Band	1|1 E2.3	End	120,432,753 bp
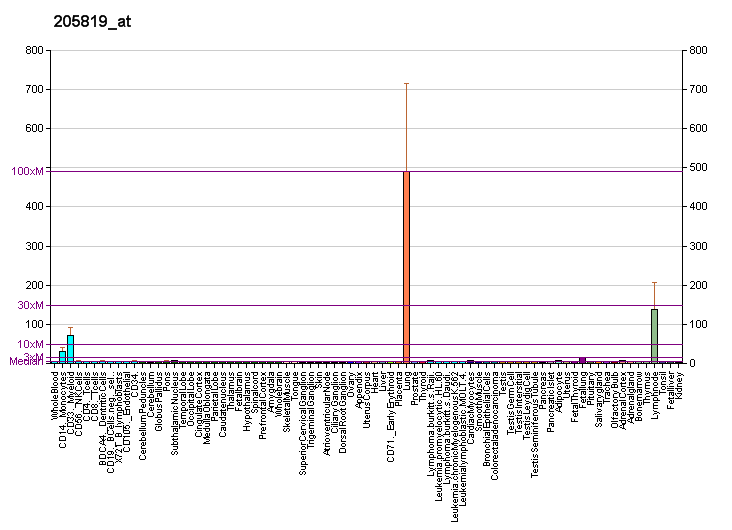
RNA expression pattern
Bgee	Human / Mouse (ortholog); Top expressed in: right lung; upper lobe of left lung; visceral pleura; synovial membrane; synovial joint; testicle; monocyte; parietal pleura; lower lobe of lung; liver / Top expressed in: stroma of bone marrow; mesenteric lymph nodes; spleen; fetal liver hematopoietic progenitor cell; embryo; subcutaneous adipose tissue; right lung lobe; left lobe of liver; tunica adventitia of aorta; endothelial cell of lymphatic vessel; More reference expression data
BioGPS	More reference expression data
Gene ontology
Molecular function	scavenger receptor activity; transmembrane signaling receptor activity; pattern recognition receptor activity; amyloid-beta binding; G protein-coupled receptor binding; cargo receptor activity
Cellular component	integral component of membrane; endocytic vesicle membrane; plasma membrane; collagen; integral component of plasma membrane; membrane; intracellular anatomical structure; cytoplasm
Biological process	apoptotic cell clearance; cell surface receptor signaling pathway; innate immune response; endocytosis; receptor-mediated endocytosis; immune system process; pattern recognition receptor signaling pathway; positive regulation of protein phosphorylation; phagocytosis, engulfment; adenylate cyclase-inhibiting G protein-coupled receptor signaling pathway; positive regulation of ERK1 and ERK2 cascade; amyloid-beta clearance
Sources:Amigo / QuickGO
Orthologs
Databases	NCBI: entry; OMA: entry
Species	Human	Mouse
Entrez	8685	17167
Ensembl	ENSG00000019169	ENSMUSG00000026390
UniProt	Q9UEW3	Q60754
RefSeq (mRNA)	NM_006770	NM_010766
RefSeq (protein)	NP_006761	NP_034896
Location (UCSC)	Chr 2: 118.94 – 118.99 Mb	Chr 1: 120.4 – 120.43 Mb
PubMed search
- Wikidata
View/Edit Human	View/Edit Mouse

Macrophage receptor with collagenous structure (MARCO) is a protein that in humans is encoded by the MARCO gene. MARCO is a class A scavenger receptor that is found on particular subsets of macrophages. Scavenger receptors are pattern recognition receptors (PRRs) found most commonly on immune cells. Their defining feature is that they bind to polyanions and modified forms of a type of cholesterol called low-density lipoprotein (LDL). MARCO is able to bind and phagocytose these ligands and pathogen-associated molecular patterns (PAMPs), leading to the clearance of pathogens and cell signaling events that lead to inflammation. As part of the innate immune system, MARCO clears, or scavenges, pathogens, which leads to inflammatory responses. The scavenger receptor cysteine-rich (SRCR) domain at the end of the extracellular side of MARCO binds ligands to activate the subsequent immune responses. MARCO expression on macrophages has been associated with tumor development and also with Alzheimer's disease, via decreased responses of cells when ligands bind to MARCO.

== Structure ==
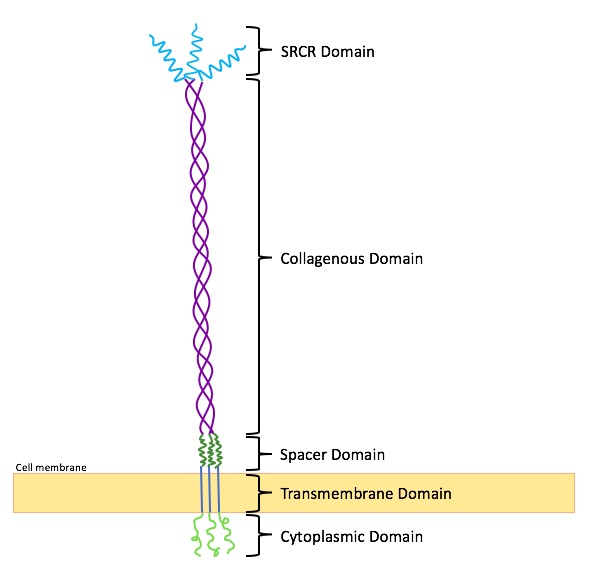
The structure of MARCO in a cell membrane. MARCO is a receptor that sits on the surface of cells in the immune system. There are five domains.

MARCO is a transmembrane protein that has 5 domains (see figure). The domain within the cell is called the cytoplasmic domain, as well as a transmembrane domain. The extracellular regions of MARCO include a spacer domain, a collagenous domain, and the SRCR domain. The SRCR domain is required for MARCO binding to ligands, via 2 highly conserved arginine residues, termed the RxR motif.

Other members of the class A scavenger receptors tend to have alpha helical coiled coil domains, but MARCO does not. The C-terminal SRCR domain of MARCO affects the ability of the receptor to bind and take up ligand, activate inflammatory signaling, and adhere to surfaces.

== Cell expression ==
MARCO is expressed on a subset of tissue-resident macrophages in normal tissues, as well as circulating monocytes, dendritic cells, and B cells. MARCO is typically present on the macrophages in the marginal zone of the spleen and the medullary lymph nodes, but it is also found in the liver. Dendritic cells increase expression of MARCO when exposed to certain pathogens, resulting in alterations to the cytoskeleton of dendritic cells and increased phagocytosis.

MARCO is highly expressed by macrophages and monocytes in the tumor microenvironment (TME), including tumor-associated macrophages (TAMs) and monocytic myeloid-derived suppressor cells (mMDSCs). Expression of MARCO correlated (FDR < 0.01 and R > 0.2126212) with expression of genes associated with immunosuppressive TAMs, such as CD68, CD163, MSR1, IL4R, CHIA, TGFB1, IL10, and IL37, whereas no correlation was observed with expression of inducible nitric oxide synthase (NOS2), which is expressed by macrophages with an anti-tumor phenotype.

== Functions ==
=== Phagocytosis ===
The primary function of scavenger receptors is to regulate phagocytosis of pathogens, but they also participate in cell–cell recognition and initiation of inflammatory responses. MARCO, being a PRR, is able to bind to a wide variety of bacteria, making it an important receptor for activating an immune response against bacteria. Soluble LPS and entire bacteria can each bind to MARCO, as well as acetylated LDL (AcLDL), oxidized LDL (OxLDL), B cells in the marginal zone of the spleen, and apoptotic cells. MARCO is therefore able to recognize and phagocytose pathogens and apoptotic cells, and operates independently of opsonization.

=== Regulation of Inflammation ===
MARCO does not directly cause an inflammatory response, but it can interact with PAMPs to promote inflammation. One way MARCO does this is by tethering a pathogen to other receptors on the cell, including PRRs such as TLR2, which then lead to the activation of the transcription factor NF-κB, which regulates expression of genes that encode cytokines. Through phagocytosis, MARCO also brings pathogens into the cell, which are processed by intracellular compartments that contain other signaling receptors such as TLR3, NOD2, and NALP3. However, lung cancer cells polarize macrophages to express MARCO and acquire an immune-suppressive phenotype, through the release of IL37. MARCO-expressing TAMs blocked activation of cytotoxic T cells and NK cells, inhibiting their proliferation, cytokine production, and tumor-cell killing capacity. Furthermore, MARCO^{+} macrophages increased proliferation of T-regulatory (Treg) cells and production of IL10, and diminished activity of CD8+ T cells. Blocking MARCO or knocking out IL37 in lung cancer cell lines repolarized TAMs, resulting in recovered cytolytic activity and anti-tumor effects of natural killer (NK) cells and T cells, as well as reduced Treg-cell activities.

== Association with diseases ==
=== Alzheimer's disease ===
The activity of MARCO on microglia, the macrophages of the brain, is believed to be altered in development of Alzheimer's disease. One primary characteristic of Alzheimer's disease is the presence of numerous senile plaques in the brain that contain amyloid beta peptides (Aβ). Initially, the microglia clear the Aβ, which binds to receptors such as MARCO. During development of Alzheimer's disease, however, the ability of microglia to clear Aβ is decreased, resulting in Aβ accumulation, which is neurotoxic. MARCO also interacts with formyl peptide receptor 2 (FPR2) to form a complex that causes the microglia to release inflammatory cytokines, which can also cause damage to neurons.

=== Cancer ===
Antibodies against MARCO have been shown to slow growth and metastasis in syngeneic mouse tumor models, by reprogramming immunosuppressive (M2)-like TAMs into inflammatory (M1)-like macrophages. This switch involves changes to the metabolic program of the macrophages and activation of NK cells. In addition, targeting MARCO on human macrophages repolarizes TAMs and restores the cytotoxic, anti-tumor capacities of NK and T cells. These findings indicate that strategies that target MARCO-expressing TAMs to remodel the immune-suppressive tumor microenvironment might be developed for cancer therapy.

In non-small-cell lung cancer (NSCLC) tissues, researchers found an association between expression of MARCO mRNA and genes that regulate immune response pathways, including immunosuppressive TAMs, T-cell infiltration, and immune checkpoint molecules. Higher infiltration of tumor tissues by macrophages was seen in tumors expressing PD-L1; macrophages within tumor cell nests co-expressed MARCO and PD-L1. MARCO is therefore a target of immune therapeutic strategies to inhibit TAMs in NSCLC, possibly in combination with immune checkpoint inhibitors.

In patients with renal cell carcinoma or colorectal cancer, those with tumors that expressed low levels of MARCO had longer survival times than patients whose tumors expressed high levels of MARCO. Additionally, high MARCO levels are observed in patients with melanoma that is refractory to checkpoint inhibitor therapy, and patients with solid tumors refractory to chemotherapy.
