= Adipose tissue macrophages =

Macrophages present in adipose tissue

Adipose tissue macrophages (ATMs) comprise resident macrophages present in adipose tissue. Besides adipocytes, adipose tissue contains the stromal vascular fraction (SVF) of cells that includes pre-adipocytes, fibroblasts, vascular endothelial cells, and a large variety of immune cells. The latter ones are composed of mast cells, eosinophils, B cells, T cells and macrophages. The number of macrophages within adipose tissue differs depending on the metabolic status. As discovered by Rudolph Leibel and Anthony Ferrante et al. in 2003 at Columbia University, the percentage of macrophages within adipose tissue ranges from 10% in lean mice and humans up to 50% in obese leptin deficient mice, and up to 40% in obese humans. ATMs comprise nearly 50% of all immune cells in normal conditions, suggesting an important role in supporting normal functioning of the adipose tissue. Increased number of adipose tissue macrophages may correlate with increased production of pro-inflammatory molecules and might therefore contribute to the pathophysiological consequences of obesity (e.g. insulin resistance, type 2 diabetes), although is becoming recognized that in healthy conditions tissue-resident macrophages actively support a variety of critical physiological functions in nearly all organs and tissues, including adipose tissue.

== Origin, location, and specification of ATM identity ==
There exist several distinct subpopulations of adipose tissue macrophages that are different in terms of both origin and function. In healthy, lean mice, nearly all macrophages are located on the outer side of blood vessels, in tight contact with adipocytes and other cells in the tissue. They can be readily distinguished by their expression of TIM4 and MHC class II markers in mice. It was shown that TIM4+ MHCII- macrophages originate in the embryo, even before adipocytes are fully formed, while TIM4- MHCII+ arise in the bone marrow. The formation of ATM identity critically depends on the transcription factor c-Maf. Macrophages from different depots (inguinal and epididymal) have recently been thoroughly characterized using single-cell RNA-sequencing in both mice and humans.

== M1/M2 macrophage polarization ==
Macrophages are remarkably plastic cells which in order to adapt to different tissue microenvironments can assume a range of different phenotypes. Accordingly, macrophages can exhibit either pro- or anti-inflammatory phenotypes and are routinely classified into M1 (classically activated) phenotype and M2 (alternatively activated) phenotype. According to this classification, macrophages acquire M1 phenotype following in vitro stimulation with interferon gamma (IFN-γ) alone or in combination with TLR ligands (e.g. lipopolysaccharide (LPS)) whereas macrophages acquire M2 phenotype after in vitro exposure to IL-4 and IL-13. M1 macrophages secrete high levels of proinflammatory cytokines (e.g. tumor necrosis factor (TNF-α), IL-6, IL-1β) and generate reactive oxygen and nitrogen species such as nitric oxide via activation of inducible nitric oxide synthase (iNOS). Conversely, M2 macrophages activate arginase 1 (Arg1) that blocks iNOS activity and therefore inhibits nitric oxide production. They also secrete anti-inflammatory cytokines (e.g. IL-10, TGF-β, IL-4) essential for inflammatory response resolution. M1 macrophages are microbicidal and tumoricidal, and stimulate adaptive immune response. M2 macrophages are associated with anti-inflammatory and homeostatic functions linked to wound healing. However, in this classification system, M1 and M2 macrophages are regarded as two extreme phenotypes. For example, macrophages stimulated with IL-4 and IL-13 are defined as M2a, whereas macrophages stimulated with LPS and apoptotic cells as M2b and macrophages stimulated with IL-10, transforming growth factor-β (TGF-β) or glucocorticoids as M2c. In adipose tissue, distinction between M1 and M2 macrophage polarization can be monitored by assessing the expression of selected markers. Macrophages displaying M1 phenotype have been characterized by expression of F4/80, CD11c and iNOS whereas macrophages displaying M2 phenotype have been characterized by expression of F4/80, CD301 and Arg1. Adiopose tissue macrophage polarization was summarized in a review article Appari M et al., et al.

The M1/M2 polarization paradigm is primarily based on in vitro studies of cells outside of their tissue context. Recent studies unveiled that tissue-specific resident macrophages generally cannot be classified into pure M1 or M2 polarization states. As a result, some functions described above may not be actually performed by ATMs, and additional states (e.g. "metabolic activated" ATMs) can also exist.

== Adipose tissue macrophages and obesity ==
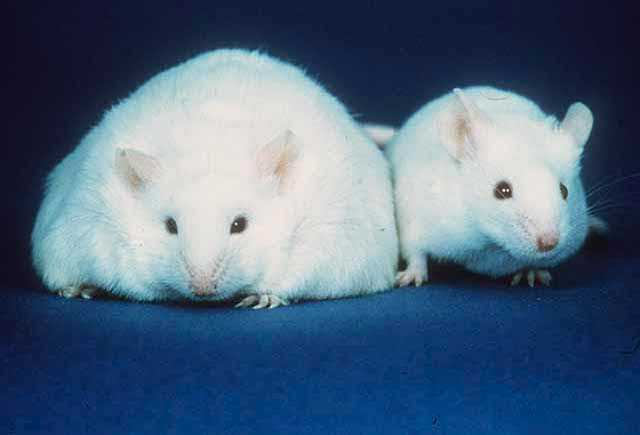
Leptin-deficient (ob/ob), severely obese mouse (on the left) compared to lean one (on the right) and characterized by increased number of adipose tissue macrophages associated with obesity-related conditions like insulin resistance

Increased recruitment of macrophages into adipose tissue is multifactoral. Adipocyte cell death observed within pathologically expanding adipose tissue is one of the factors. Macrophages are specialized phagocytes that remove dying or dead cells or cellular debris. Within adipose tissue, presence of dead adipocytes is a hallmark of obesity. Macrophages surrounding dying or dead adipocytes form crown-like structures (CLSs), identified by the absence of perilipin staining.

In addition to increased number of macrophages within adipose tissue, obesity also induces a phenotypic switch in these cells toward the pro-inflammatory phenotype. Moreover, some inflammatory cytokines such as tumor necrosis factor is mostly derived from macrophages rather than adipocytes. It has been proposed that their presence contributes to the development of insulin resistance and type 2 diabetes. Early and late stages of diet-induced obesity can also induce macrophage populations that are not representative of M1 or M2 phenotypes, including metabolically activate macrophages (MMe) and oxidized macrophages (Mox), both associated with insulin resistance.

Adipose tissue macrophages isolated from obese patients express growth factors, cytokines, chemokines, and proteolytic enzymes involved in the regulation of tumor growth, angiogenesis, invasion, and metastatic spread, and resemble macrophages present in tumor stroma.

== Adipose tissue macrophages and weight loss ==
Acute weight loss is also associated with increased, yet transient recruitment of macrophages into adipose tissue. However the recruited macrophages do not promote inflammatory response but rather regulate lipolysis. Recruited macrophages are characterized by higher expression of scavenger receptors (i.e. CD36 and macrophage scavenger receptor 1 (MSR1)) and lipid-handling genes (i.e. adipose differentiation-related protein (Adfp), fatty acid-binding protein 4 (Fabp4), ApoE and ABCA1), and increased accumulation of Oil Red O-positive lipids. In this case, release of free fatty acids (FFAs) serves as a signal for macrophage recruitment.

It has been shown in mice that adipose tissue macrophages regulate the age-related reduction of adipocyte lipolysis during ageing by lowering the bioavailability of noradrenaline. Inhibition of MAOA, an enzyme known to degrade noradrenaline, reversed the reduction in noradrenaline concentration and restored lipolysis in mice.

== Adipose tissue macrophages and tumor growth ==
Macrophages within tumor stroma, so called tumor-associated macrophages (TAMs) promote tumor growth and metastasis. Tumor-associated macrophage infiltration correlates with poor prognosis in patients with breast, cervix, bladder and brain cancers. Pathophysiological interaction between tumor-associated macrophages and surrounding cells, such as endothelial cells promote tumor progression. In 1971, Judah Folkman proposed that angiogenesis plays essential role in tumor growth. Macrophages secrete many pro-angiogenic factors including vascular endothelial growth factor (VEGF), TNF-α, granulocyte macrophage colony-stimulating factor (GM-CSF) and IL-1 and IL-6. Additionally it has been shown that adipose tissue surrounding certain tumors or metastases to the lymph nodes, which are embedded in adipose tissue, fuels tumor growth by serving as a depot for adipose tissue macrophages that stimulate angiogenesis and resemble TAMs.
