= Moriya Tsuji =

American academic (born 1958)

- Born: January 1, 1958 (age 68); Tokyo, Japan
- Education: Jikei University School of Medicine, University of Tokyo
- Scientific career
- Fields: Immunology, microbiology, oncology, vaccinology
- Workplaces: Columbia University, Columbia University College of Physicians and Surgeons, Aaron Diamond AIDS Research Center
- Doctoral advisor: Tomio Tada

Moriya Tsuji (born January 1, 1958) is an American immunologist and vaccinologist. As of 2024, he serves as a Professor of Medicine in the Division of Infectious Diseases, Department of Medicine, and at the Aaron Diamond AIDS Research Center.

== Early life and education ==
Tsuji was born on January 1, 1958 in Tokyo, Japan. During his childhood, Tsuji spent a year at the Ecole Primaire d'Application Michelet in Lille, France, where his father, Moriyasu Tsuji, worked as a visiting scientist in the laboratory of André Capron at the Pasteur Institute between 1966 and 1967.

He ranked at the top of his class after the completion of his one-year tenure in that school. After returning to Japan, Tsuji spent his junior and high school days in Hiroshima, Japan.

In 1983, Tsuji earned his Doctor of Medicine degree at the Jikei University School of Medicine in Tokyo. Four years later, he was awarded his Doctor of Philosophy from the Department of Immunology at the University of Tokyo, in 1987 under the mentorship of Professor Tomio Tada.

Tsuji moved to New York City in 1987 and later became a citizen of the United States.

== Career ==
Immediately after obtaining a Doctor of Philosophy degree, Tsuji joined the Department of Medical and Molecular Parasitology, headed by Ruth Sonntag Nussenzweig, at New York University School of Medicine in 1987. He was appointed an assistant professor at the Department of Medical and Molecular Parasitology at NYU School of Medicine in 1991.

In 1998, Tsuji was awarded tenure with an associate professorship in the same department. After taking a sabbatical at the Aaron Diamond AIDS Research Center, headed by David Ho from 2002 to 2003, Tsuji moved there as an associate professor and staff investigator. He was promoted to Aaron Diamond Professor at Rockefeller University in 2012.

In 2020, Tsuji moved to Columbia University and became a professor of medicine in the Division of Infectious Diseases, Department of Medicine, as well as in the Aaron Diamond AIDS Research Center, at the Columbia University College of Physicians and Surgeons. Tsuji has been a visiting professor at Chiba University in Chiba (city), Japan, and the Jikei University School of Medicine in Tokyo.

=== As a teacher ===
Tsuji began his teaching career in 1992. His first assignment was for medical students at the New York University School of Medicine in a parasitology course. He has also served as a lecturer on immunology for undergraduate and graduate students at New York University School of Medicine.

In 1997, he served at the Federal University of São Paulo in São Paulo, Brazil, as a lecturer on immunology for graduate students. Between 1998 and 2000, Tsuji served as a lecturer on immunology for graduate students and scientists at the University of Bamako in Bamako, Mali.

== Research ==
Tsuji's major research interests have been development of a glycolipid-based adjuvant for vaccines against infectious diseases and cancers, exploration of natural Killer T-cell-mediated protection against infectious diseases and cancers, and generation of "humanized mice" model mounting human immune system.

== Major assignments ==
Tsuji served as an Admission Committee member on the Medical Scientist Training Program (M.D.-PhD Program) at NYU School of Medicine from 1998 to 2003.

Tsuji served as a panel member for the Vaccine Science Portfolio Advisory Council of the PATH Malaria Vaccine Initiative of the Gates Foundation from 2008 to 2012 and an advisory member for the Malaria Vaccine Consultation Group of the National Institute of Allergy and Infectious Diseases from 2010 to 2012.

He has been an International Advisory Member for the International Immunological Memory and Vaccine Forum since 2015.

For grant review, Dr. Tsuji has been a founding roster member for the Immunity and Host Defense study section of the National Institute of Allergy and Infectious Diseases and National Institutes of Health since 2004.

== Scientific achievements ==
Tsuji has published over 160 peer review papers in journals such as Nature (journal), Nature Medicine, Nature Communications, Journal of Experimental Medicine, Journal of Clinical Investigation, and Proceedings of the National Academy of Sciences of the United States of America.

As a postdoctoral fellow at the NYU School of Medicine, Tsuji broke new ground in uncovering the protective role of CD4+ T cells and gamma delta T cells against the liver stage of rodent malaria. The discovery was achieved in collaboration with Susumu Tonegawa's laboratory at Massachusetts Institute of Technology.

Soon afterwards, Tsuji expanded his research to the field of malaria vaccine development, particularly the development of viral vector-based malaria vaccines that can elicit a potent protective CD8+ T-cell response. In collaboration with James Wilson (scientist) at the University of Pennsylvania, he was the first to identify the adenovirus as an excellent vector for inducing CD8+ T cell-mediated immunity.

Tsuji also discovered that a Cd1-restricted T cell stimulatory glycolipid, α-galacosylceramide (α-GalCer), can act as an adjuvant to enhance CD8+ T cell response induced by a malaria vaccine. With Ralph M. Steinman at Rockefeller University, Tsuji found one analog of α-GalCer displays a unique adjuvant effect. From a focused synthetic glycolipid library of more than 100 α-GalCer analogs, Tsuji identified a novel glycolipid, 7DW8-5, as a adjuvant capable of enhancing CD8+ T cell response induced by various vaccines. 7DW8-5 glycolipid has also been shown to prevent respiratory virus infections upon intranasal administration in mice.

Tsuji's team successfully isolated CD4+ T-cell clones that recognize the carbohydrate and have named them, "Tcarb". This was done in collaboration with Dennis Kasper's group at Harvard University. His discovery of Tcarb has not only impacted on the current paradigm of basic T cell biology but has also led to radical advancements in glycoconjugate-based vaccine development.

Tsuji's team has also succeeded in establishing a humanized mouse model that mimics the human immune system, called HIS mice. He used a novel adeno-associated virus vector-mediated gene delivery system for the first time to introduce human genes to establish the HIS mice, which was done in collaboration with James M. Wilson at the University of Pennsylvania. These mice possess functional human CD4+ and CD8+ T cells, natural killer T cells and dendritic cells, and can mount cell-mediated immunity upon immunization with various vaccines that include a malaria vaccine.

== Awards and recognition ==
Tsuji was awarded a New York University Whitehead Presidential Award for Junior Faculty and American Cancer Society Institutional Award in 1993.

Tsuji was also awarded an American Lung Association of New York State Research Award and Mizutani Foundation for Glycoscience Award in 1996 and 2004, respectively.

In 2021, Tsuji was elected a Fellow of the American Society of Tropical Medicine and Hygiene.

His work was recognized, as "A Special Themed Issue Dedicated to Professor Moriya Tsuji" in Innovative Immunology was edited in Biomolecules (journal) in 2003.

Tsuji has been awarded 13 patents from United States Patent and Trademark Office for his inventions.
