= Α-Galactosylceramide =

α-Galactosylceramide

Names
- IUPAC name N-[(2S,3S,4R)-1-(α-D-Galactopyranosyloxy)-3,4-dihydroxyoctadecan-2-yl]hexacosanamide
- Systematic IUPAC name N-[(2S,3S,4R)-3,4-Dihydroxy-1-{[(2S,3R,4S,5R,6R)-3,4,5-trihydroxy-6-(hydroxymethyl)oxan-2-yl]oxy}octadecan-2-yl]hexacosanamide
- Other names α-GalCer, KRN7000

Identifiers
CAS Number	158021-47-7
3D model (JSmol)	Interactive image
Abbreviations	α-GalCer
Beilstein Reference	7326597
ChEBI	CHEBI:466659
ChEMBL	ChEMBL384200
ChemSpider	2104816
DrugBank	DB12232
EC Number	973-258-3
KEGG	C16892
PubChem CID	2826713
UNII	WX671898JF
CompTox Dashboard (EPA)	DTXSID40935847
- InChI: InChI=1S/C50H99NO9/c1-3-5-7-9-11-13-15-17-18-19-20-21-22-23-24-25-26-27-29-31-33-35-37-39-45(54)51-42(41-59-50-49(58)48(57)47(56)44(40-52)60-50)46(55)43(53)38-36-34-32-30-28-16-14-12-10-8-6-4-2/h42-44,46-50,52-53,55-58H,3-41H2,1-2H3,(H,51,54)/t42-,43+,44+,46-,47-,48-,49+,50-/m0/s1 Key: VQFKFAKEUMHBLV-BYSUZVQFSA-N
- SMILES: CCCCCCCCCCCCCCCCCCCCCCCCCC(=O)N[C@@H](CO[C@@H]1[C@@H]([C@H]([C@H]([C@H](O1)CO)O)O)O)[C@@H]([C@@H](CCCCCCCCCCCCCC)O)O

Properties
Chemical formula	C_{50}H_{99}NO_{9}
Molar mass	858.340 g·mol^{−1}
Appearance	White powder
Melting point	189–190 °C (372–374 °F; 462–463 K)
- Except where otherwise noted, data are given for materials in their standard state (at 25 °C [77 °F], 100 kPa). Infobox references

α-Galactosylceramide (α-GalCer, KRN7000) is a synthetic glycolipid derived from structure-activity relationship studies of galactosylceramides isolated from the marine sponge Agelas mauritianus. α-GalCer is a strong immunostimulant and shows potent anti-tumour activity in many in vivo models.

== Immunostimulatory properties ==
α-GalCer is a potent activator of iNKT cells, and a model CD1d antigen. The invariant T cell receptor of the iNKT cell is able to bind the CD1d:glycolipid complex leading to iNKT cell activation in both mice and humans.

=== Adjuvant activity ===
In combination with a peptide antigen, α-GalCer is able to stimulate a strong immune response against the epitope. The CD1d:glycolipid:TCR interaction activates the iNKT cell which can then activate the dendritic cell. This causes the release of a range of cytokines and licenses the dendritic cell to activate a peptide-specific T cell response. This adjuvant acts through this cellular interaction, rather than through classic pattern recognition receptor pathways.
