= CD36 antigen =

CD36 family

Identifiers
- Symbol: CD36
- Pfam: PF01130
- InterPro: IPR002159
Available protein structures:
- PDB: IPR002159 PF01130 (ECOD; PDBsum)
- AlphaFold: IPR002159; PF01130

CD36 antigen is a transmembrane, highly glycosylated, glycoprotein expressed by monocytes, macrophages, platelets, microvascular endothelial cells and adipose tissues. CD36 recognises oxidized low density lipoprotein, long chain fatty acids, anionic phospholipids, collagen types I, IV and V, thrombospondin and Plasmodium falciparum infected erythrocytes.

CD molecules are leucocyte antigens on cell surfaces. CD antigens nomenclature is updated at Protein Reviews On The Web (https://web.archive.org/web/20080920090434/http://mpr.nci.nih.gov/prow/).

== Subfamilies ==
- Adhesion molecule CD36 InterPro: IPR005428
- Lysosome membrane protein II InterPro: IPR005429

== Human proteins containing this domain ==
CD36; SCARB1; SCARB2;
