= Isoglobotriosylceramide =

Names
- IUPAC name N-{(2S,3R,4E)-1-[α-D-Galactopyranosyl-(1→3)-β-D-galactopyranosyl-(1→4)-β-D-glucopyranosyloxy]-3-hydroxyoctadec-4-en-2-yl}acetamide
- Systematic IUPAC name N-[(2S,3R,4E)-1-{[(2R,3R,4R,5S,6R)-5-{[(2S,3R,4S,5S,6R)-3,5-dihydroxy-6-(hydroxymethyl)-4-{[(2R,3R,4S,5R,6R)-3,4,5-trihydroxy-6-(hydroxymethyl)oxan-2-yl]oxy}oxan-2-yl]oxy}-3,4-dihydroxy-6-(hydroxymethyl)oxan-2-yl]oxy}-3-hydroxyoctadec-4-en-2-yl]acetamide
- Other names isoglobotriasyl ceramide

Identifiers
3D model (JSmol)	Interactive image
ChEBI	CHEBI:52570
ChemSpider	65322719
KEGG	G00403
PubChem CID	73427372
CompTox Dashboard (EPA)	DTXSID901031605
- InChI: InChI=1S/C38H69NO18/c1-3-4-5-6-7-8-9-10-11-12-13-14-15-16-23(44)22(39-21(2)43)20-52-36-32(50)30(48)34(26(19-42)55-36)56-38-33(51)35(28(46)25(18-41)54-38)57-37-31(49)29(47)27(45)24(17-40)53-37/h15-16,22-38,40-42,44-51H,3-14,17-20H2,1-2H3,(H,39,43)/b16-15+/t22-,23+,24+,25+,26+,27-,28-,29-,30+,31+,32+,33+,34+,35-,36+,37+,38-/m0/s1 Key: DXXSRTXAOPBLSG-HQKKTFEGSA-N
- SMILES: CCCCCCCCCCCCC/C=C/[C@H]([C@H](CO[C@H]1[C@@H]([C@H]([C@@H]([C@H](O1)CO)O[C@H]2[C@@H]([C@H]([C@H]([C@H](O2)CO)O)O[C@@H]3[C@@H]([C@H]([C@H]([C@H](O3)CO)O)O)O)O)O)O)NC(=O)C)O

Properties
Chemical formula	C_{38}H_{69}NO_{18}
Molar mass	827.959 g·mol^{−1}
- Except where otherwise noted, data are given for materials in their standard state (at 25 °C [77 °F], 100 kPa). Infobox references

Isoglobotriosylceramide, Gal(α1→3)Gal(β1→4)Glcβ(1→1)Cer, abbreviated as iGb3, is an iso-globo-series of glycosphingolipid, which mysteriously disappeared in most mammals studied (pig, mouse, and human), except trace amount reported in the thymus.

iGb3 was discovered in canine and rat intestines among iso-globo-series of glycosphingolipids. First NMR spectrums for standard iGb3 were published by Dr. Tomoya Ogawa.

The physiological function of iGb3 is not clear. It has been identified as a CD1d- presented self-antigen for an innate type of immune cells termed as Natural Killer T (NKT) cells. Extensive biochemical studies by multiple methods including HPLC, mass spectrometry, and NMR did not lead to positive finding of iGb3 in major organs of mouse, pig, and human species, except trace amount in thymus and immune cells, suggesting a selection pressure during evolution. Obviously, the immune selection pressure against iGb3 is mechanistically different from the well known anti-alpha-Gal antibodies, which caused the loss of alpha1,3-galactose epitope on glycoproteins in humans, apes, and old world monkeys. The disappearance of iGb3 in pig and mouse species cannot be attributed to anti-alpha-Gal antibodies which are absent in these animals.
