= Group 1 CD1-restricted T cells =

Group 1 CD1-restricted T cells are a heterogeneous group of unconventional T cells defined by their ability to recognize antigens bound on group 1 CD1 molecules (CD1a, CD1b and CD1c) with their TCR. Natural killer T (NKT) cells are a similar population with affinity to CD1d (the only group 2 CD1 molecule). Both groups recognize lipid antigens in contrast to the conventional peptide antigens presented on MHC class 1 and 2 proteins. Most identified T-cells that bind group 1 CD1 proteins are αβ T cells and some are γδ T cells. Both foreign and endogenous lipid antigens activate these cells.

The TCR usually recognizes the hydrophilic part of the antigen which protrudes outwards from the CD1 protein after the lipid chains are bound in a groove. Small hydrophobic antigens lacking a polar part have also been shown to activate CD1a-restricted T cells, indicating that in this case the TCR may bind CD1 directly following displacement of nonimmunogenic ligands.

== Group 1 CD1 proteins ==
Group 1 CD1 (CD1a, CD1b, CD1c) is a family of surface glycoproteins expressed on Dendritic cells, Langerhans cells and in some stages of thymocyte maturation. Some subsets of B cells express CD1c. These proteins are related to MHC class 1 molecules but have a high affinity for the lipidic moieties of antigens. Mice lack any counterpart for group 1 CD1 proteins, which has complicated the research of in vivo function.

CD1 proteins are structurally similar to MHC class 1 proteins, containing 3 domains and non-covalently bound β2 microglobulin. They lack the genetic diversity typical of MHC genes and have a very limited number of polymorphisms, most of which produce silent mutations. Their variability reflects the limited scale of the lipid repertoire found in organisms compared to the large variety of proteins. Proteins can also easily acquire mutations, whereas the multi-step process of lipid synthesis is much less likely to change.

On their way through the endoplasmic reticulum and Golgi apparatus they acquire nonimmunogenic lipid spacers. These spacers were identified to be diacylglycerides or deoxyceramides and their variety may explain the broad range of lipid chain lengths that group 1 CD1 proteins can accommodate, as the spacers have been observed to slide into different positions for different antigens. After CD1 proteins reach the surface of the cell, they are internalized and the members show different patterns of localization with CD1b trafficking through late endosomes and lysosomes and CD1a localizing mostly in early endosomes. CD1c broadly localizes in a combination of the above-mentioned compartments. CD1 proteins exchange their spacers for immunogenic ligands in endosomes and lysosomes with the help of several lipid transfer proteins (including CD1e).

== Function ==
In vivo studies have been hindered by the lack of orthologous proteins in mice. Humanized or transgenic mice are used to overcome this discrepancy and some studies use different animal species. Their function in Mycobacterium tuberculosis infection has been the main focus in past research.

Group 1 CD1-restricted T cells are more similar to conventional T cells because their response takes days to weeks and they exhibit an accelerated response after prior immunization. This differs from their group 2 counterparts (Natural killer T ceCortical thymocyteslls) which react swiftly but undergo anergy following reexposure.

=== Mycobacterium tuberculosis infection ===
Many lipid antigens of Mycobacterium tuberculosis have been identified, including: mycolic acid, glucose and glycerol monomycolates, lipoarabinomannan, phosphatidylinositol mannoside, diacylsulfoglycolipid, mannosyl-β-1-phosphomycoketide and didehydroxymycobactin. Most of these antigens are bound to CD1b.

Group 1 CD1-restricted T cells are activated after Mycobacterium infection and produce IFN-γ and TNF-α (Th1 type response). These cells can be double negative (CD4^{−}CD8^{−}), CD4^{+} or CD8^{+} and possess strong cytotoxic capabilities. Studies using CD1b tetramers presenting the mycobacterial product glucose monomycolate identified two CD4^{+} TCRαβ^{+} T cell populations which differ from the otherwise variable TCR composition of previously isolated subsets, one termed 'GEM (Germline-encoded, mycolyl-reactive)' for their conserved TCR repertoire (specifically TRAV1-2^{+}TRAJ9^{+}) and 'LDN5-like' (TRBV4-1^{+}). These cells are rare in individuals that have not encountered Mycobacterium tuberculosis.

CD1 expression is downregulated in antigen presenting cells infected with live Mycobacteria, perhaps as a means of immune evasion. This downregulation can be also found in some leukemia cells.

=== Autoreactivity ===
Group 1 CD1-restricted T cells can be activated by endogenous lipids, including gangliosides (GM1, GD1a, GD1b, GT1b, and GQ1b), sulfatides, sphingomyelin, phophatidylglycerol, lysophospholipids, squalene, wax esters, and triacylglycerides.

Methyl-lysophosphatidic acids (mLPAs) are rare in healthy monocytes and B cells but are abundant in leukemic cells. CD1c self-reactive T cells were found to kill acute leukemia cells expressing CD1c binding these lipids.

CD1a self-reactive T cells were found in the blood of healthy individuals. These cells express skin-homing receptors and produce interleukin 22 after binding CD1a on Langerhans cells. CD1a binds many endogenous lipids found in skin-oil and is able to activate T-cells even with ligands that lack a hydrophilic part, e.g. squalene.

CD8^{+} TCR αβ^{+} CD1b T cells have been found in the central nervous system of patients with multiple sclerosis. They recognized glycolipids and secreted IFN-γ and TNF-α.

Other autoimmune diseases where group 1 CD1 restricted T cells might contribute include psoriasis and systemic lupus erythematosus.
