= Biomolecules (journal) =

- Discipline: Biochemistry, Molecular biology, Cell biology
- Language: English

Publication details
- History: 2011–present
- Publisher: MDPI
- Frequency: Continuous
- Open access: Yes
- License: Creative Commons Attribution License
- Impact factor: 4.8 (2023)

Standard abbreviations
- ISO 4: Biomolecules

Indexing
- ISSN: 2218-273X

Links
- Journal homepage

Biomolecules is a peer-reviewed open-access scientific journal covering various aspects of biochemistry, molecular biology, and cell biology research. It is published by MDPI and was established in 2011.

The journal publishes research articles, reviews, and commentaries related to the structure, function, and interactions of biological molecules.

== Abstracting and indexing ==
The journal is abstracted and indexed in:

- DOAJ
- ProQuest databases
- PubMed
- Science Citation Index Expanded
- Scopus

According to the Journal Citation Reports, the journal has a 2022 impact factor of 4.8.
