= Scavenger receptor (immunology) =

Large and diverse superfamily of cell surface receptors

Identifiers
- Symbol: Scavenger receptor
- OPM superfamily: 456
- OPM protein: 5ktf
- Membranome: 4

Scavenger receptors are a large and diverse superfamily of cell surface receptors. Its properties were first recorded in 1970 by Drs. Brown and Goldstein, with the defining property being the ability to bind and remove modified low density lipoproteins (LDL). Today scavenger receptors are known to be involved in a wide range of processes, such as: homeostasis, apoptosis, inflammatory diseases and pathogen clearance. Scavenger receptors are mainly found on myeloid cells and other cells that bind to numerous ligands, primarily endogenous and modified host-molecules together with pathogen-associated molecular patterns (PAMPs), and remove them. The Kupffer cells in the liver are particularly rich in scavenger receptors, includes SR-A1, SR-A1.1, and MARCO (SR-A6).

== Function ==
The scavenger receptor superfamily is defined by its ability to recognize and bind a broad range of common ligands. These ligands include: polyanionic ligands including lipoproteins, apoptotic cells, cholesterol ester, phospholipids, proteoglycans, ferritin, and carbohydrates. This broad recognition range allows scavenger receptors to play an important role in homeostasis and the combating of diseases. This is accomplished via the recognition of various PAMP's and DAMP's, which leads to the removal or scavenging of pathogens with the recognition of PAMP's and the removal of apoptotic cells, self reactive antigens and the products of oxidative stress with the recognition of DAMP's.

In atherosclerotic lesions, macrophages that express scavenger receptors on their plasma membrane take up the oxidized LDL deposited in the blood vessel wall aggressively, and develop into foam cells. Likewise, they secrete various inflammatory cytokines and accelerate the development of atherosclerosis.

== Types ==
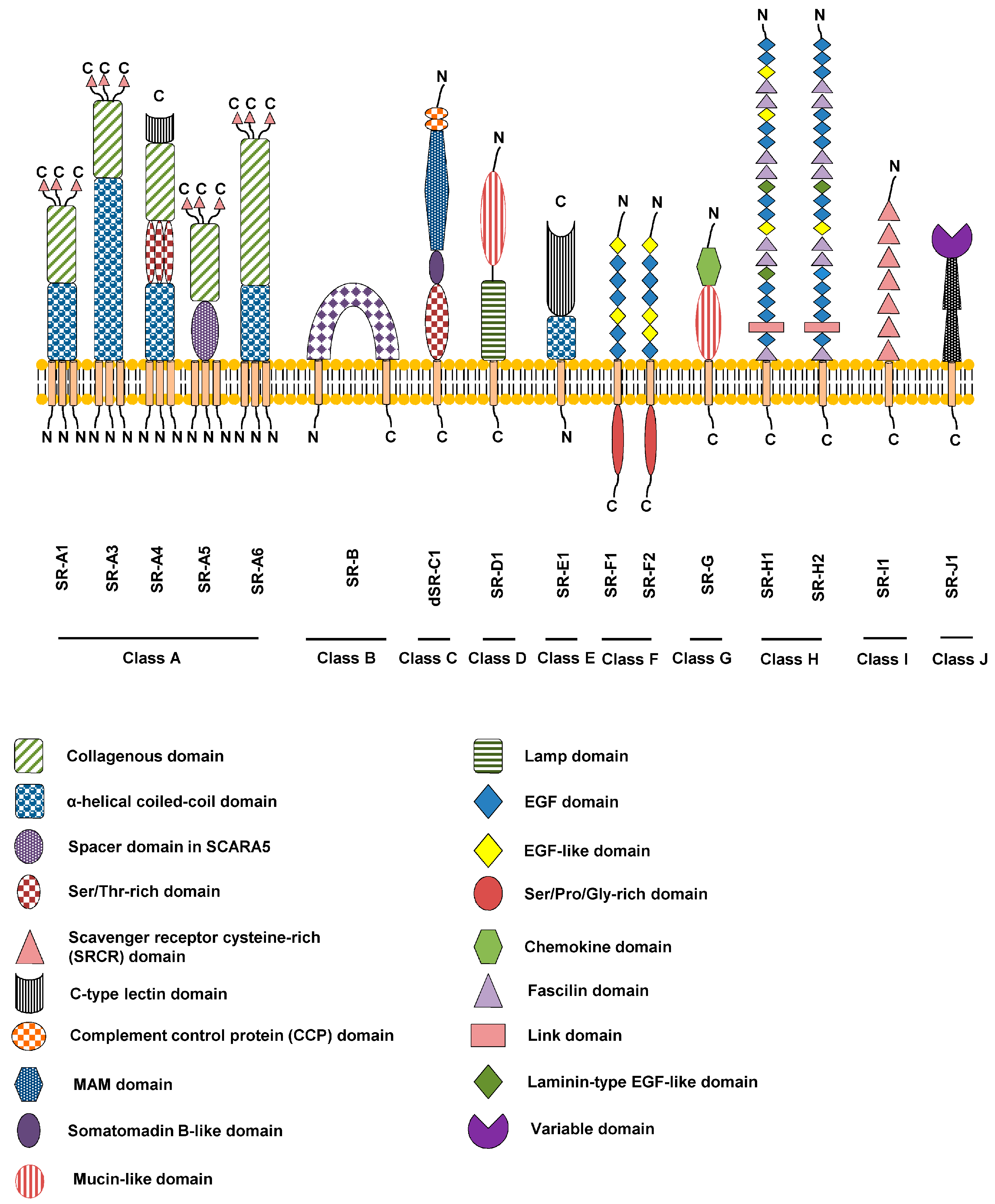
Schematic collection of the scavenger receptor superfamily. Classes A-J are displayed with their respective domains. All classes have a mammalian orthologue, with the exception of C.

Scavenger receptors are incredibly diverse and therefore, organized into many different classes, starting at A and continuing to L. This organization is based on their domain architecture. In 2014 a standard mammalian nomenclature was proposed by a group of 15 immunologists and in 2017 a consensus statement of 25 immunologists reiterated recommendation of this new nomenclature. Acceptance was not universal, however, as later publications have continued to use the legacy names based on roman numerals and human gene symbols.

- Class A is mainly expressed in the macrophage, as a protein whose molecular weight is about 80 kDa and makes a trimer; it is composed of 1) cytosol domain, 2) transmembrane domain, 3) spacer domain, 4) alpha-helical coiled-coil domain, 5) collagen-like domain, and 6) cysteine-rich domain.
- Class B has two transmembrane regions, one on each end.
- Class C is a transmembrane protein whose N-terminus is located extracellularly.

=== Nomenclature ===
The standard nomenclature goes as follows:

- A receptor name looks like SR-F1 or SR-F1.1.
- The "F" part stands for the class of the receptor, which goes from A to L.
- The first number "1" indicates the first-discovered receptor of the class, increasing by order of discovery.
- The additional ".1" means the first-discovered alternative splicing form, increasing by order of discovery.

=== Class A ===
Class A receptors are a type II membrane protein who use their collagen-like domain for ligand binding.

Members include:Scavenger receptors type 1 (SR-A1), which is a trimer with a molecular weight of about 220-250 kDa (the molecular weight of monomeric protein is about 80 kDa). It preferentially binds modified LDL, either acylated (acLDL) or oxidized (oxLDL). Other ligands include: β-amyloid, heat shock proteins, surface molecules of Gram-positive and Gram-negative bacteria, hepatitis C virus.

SR-A1 can be alternatively spliced to generate a truncation at the C-terminus; it is contained within the Endoplasmatic Reticulum, and just like the unspliced version, has a strong affinity for polyanionic ligand binding.

- SR-A1: SCARA1 or MSR1; besides macrophages they can be found on smooth vascular muscle cells and endothelial tissues; oxidative stress enhances their presence on the endothelium.
  - SR-A1.1: (formerly SR-AII) is an alternatively spliced form of SR-A1. Due to the existence of an "SR-AII", the SR-A2 name is unused.
- SR-A3: SCARA3, MSRL1 or APC7; plays a significant role in the protection against reactive oxygen species (ROS).
- SR-A4: SCARA4 or COLEC12; acts as a receptor for the detection, engulfment and destruction of oxidatively modified LDL for vascular endothelial cells.
- SR-A5: SCARA5 or TESR; located in a diverse set of tissues, such as, lung placenta, intestine, heart and epithelial cells, it has a high affinity for bacteria but not for modified LDL.
- SR-A6: SCARA2 or MARCO; only found on macrophages in the peritoneum, lymph nodes, liver and specific zones of the spleen. Bacteria and lipopolysaccharide produced by bacteria stimulate its expression; SR-A6 is unable to connect with modified LDL.

=== Class B ===
CD36 and scavenger receptor class BI are identified as genes encoding for oxidized LDL receptors and classified into scavenger receptor B (SR-B). Both proteins have two transmembrane domains with an extracellular loop, and they are concentrated in a specific plasma membrane microdomain, the caveolae.

Members include:

- SR-B1: SCARB1 or CD36L1; can interact not only with oxidized LDL but also with normal LDL and high-density lipoproteins (HDL), and plays an important role in their transportation into the cells. Recent studies have indicated that SR-B1 is likely to be the major receptor involved in HDL metabolism in mice and humans. Besides LDL and HDL, SR-B1 binds to viruses and bacteria. SR-B1 is located on hepatocytes, steroidogenic cells, arterial wall and macrophages. Mutations in SR-B1 have a negative effect on fertility and innate immune response, and leads to an increase in atherosclerosis.
- SCARB2: not included in the immunologists' SR-B nomenclature.
- SR-B2: SCARB3 or CD36; has been thought to be implicated in cell adhesion, development of blood vessels, in the phagocytosis of apoptotic cells, and in the metabolism of long-chain fatty acids. Furthermore, it has been shown that CD36 is heavily involved with macrophage migration and signalling, together with protecting the host against, bacteria, fungi and malaria parasites. In experimental mice models of atherosclerosis, in which the gene for CD36 has been deleted, the mice have a greatly reduced number of atherosclerotic lesions. CD36 can be found in many different cells, for example, insulin-responsive cells, hematopoietic cells like platelets, monocytes, and macrophages, endothelial cells, and specialized epithelial cells in the breast and the eye.

=== Class C ===
Not found in mammals. Originally found in Drosophila. At least four genes exist. SR-dC1 is relatively well-characterized and is known to bind to acLDL and surface molecules of Gram-positive and Gram-negative bacteria.

=== Class D ===
- SR-D1: CD68 and its mouse homologue, macrosialin, has a unique N-terminal mucin-like domain. Mucin is a naturally occurring viscous substance that is composed of a protein and covalently linked polysaccharides.

=== Class E ===
- SR-E1: OLR1 / LOX-1. Was isolated from an aortic endothelial cell; recently, it has been discovered in macrophages and vascular smooth muscle cells in artery vessels. The expression of LOX-1 is induced by inflammatory stimuli, so LOX-1 is thought to be involved in the development of atherosclerotic lesions.
- SR-E2: CLEC7A
- SR-E3: CD206/MRC1
- SR-E4: ASGPR

=== Class F ===
- SR-F1: SCARF1
- SR-F2: SCARF2
- SR-F3: MEGF10

=== Class G ===
- SR-G1: CXCL16

=== Class H ===
- SR-H1: STAB1 uptake of slightly oxidized LDL
- SR-H2: STAB2 uptake of heavily oxidized LDL

=== Class I ===
- SR-I1: CD163
- SR-I2: CD163L1
- SR-I3: SCART1

=== Class J ===
- SR-J1: RAGE (gene) membrane form
  - SR-J1.1: soluble form

=== Class K ===
- SR-K1: CD44

=== Class L ===
- SR-L1: LRP1
- SR-L2: LRP2

=== Classes to be named ===
- SRCRB4D
- CD14
- Ly75/CD205
- CD207/Langerin
- CD209/DC-SIGN
