= CD1D =

Protein-coding gene in humans

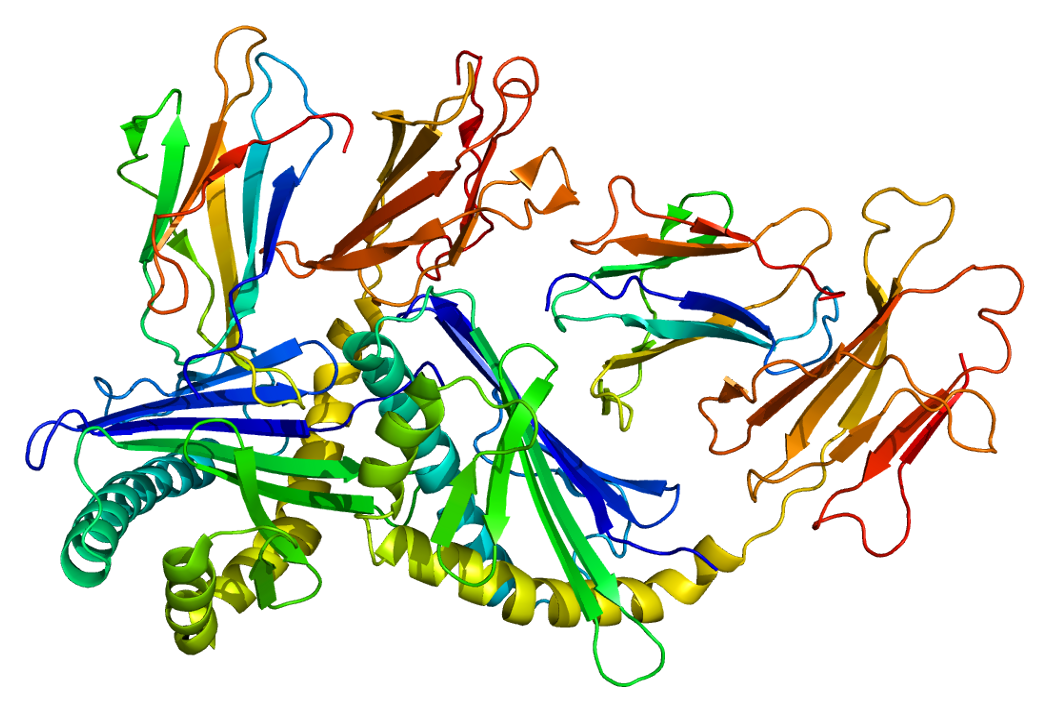

Identifiers
- Aliases: CD1D, CD1A, R3, R3G1, CD1d molecule
- External IDs: OMIM: 188410; MGI: 107674; GeneCards: CD1D
Available structures
PDB	Ortholog search: PDBe RCSB
PDB	List of PDB id codes 4WO4, 1ZT4, 2PO6, 3HUJ, 3SDX, 3TZV, 3U0P, 3VWJ, 3VWK, 4EN3, 4LHU, 4MNG, 4MQ7, 4WW2

Gene location (Human)
Chr.	Chromosome 1 (human)
Band	1q23.1	Start	158,178,030 bp
Band	1q23.1	End	158,186,427 bp

Gene location (Mouse)
Chr.	Chromosome 3 (mouse)
Band	3 F1|3 37.91 cM	Start	86,903,141 bp
Band	3 F1|3 37.91 cM	End	86,906,748 bp
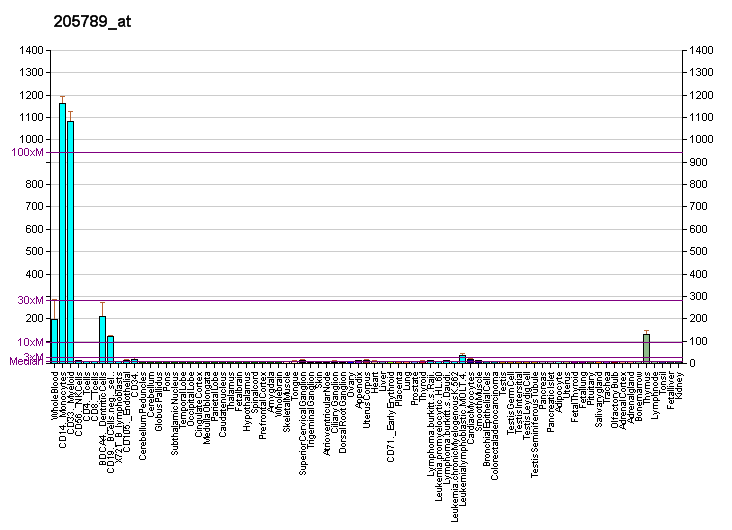
RNA expression pattern
Bgee	Human / Mouse (ortholog); Top expressed in: monocyte; granulocyte; thymus; spleen; blood; gonad; right lobe of liver; appendix; jejunal mucosa; duodenum / Top expressed in: white adipose tissue; left lobe of liver; subcutaneous adipose tissue; brown adipose tissue; tunica adventitia of aorta; intercostal muscle; body of femur; lactiferous gland; fossa; Rostral migratory stream; More reference expression data
BioGPS	More reference expression data
Gene ontology
Molecular function	beta-2-microglobulin binding; lipopeptide binding; histone binding; endogenous lipid antigen binding; lipid antigen binding; exogenous lipid antigen binding; cell adhesion molecule binding; protein binding
Cellular component	cytoplasm; integral component of membrane; endosome; endoplasmic reticulum membrane; membrane; integral component of plasma membrane; cell surface; lysosomal membrane; basolateral plasma membrane; lysosome; endosome membrane; plasma membrane; endoplasmic reticulum; extracellular space; external side of plasma membrane
Biological process	immune system process; T cell selection; heterotypic cell-cell adhesion; positive regulation of T cell proliferation; detection of bacterium; positive regulation of innate immune response; antigen processing and presentation, exogenous lipid antigen via MHC class Ib; innate immune response; viral process; antigen processing and presentation, endogenous lipid antigen via MHC class Ib; regulation of immune response; positive regulation of T cell mediated cytotoxicity; immune response
Sources:Amigo / QuickGO
Orthologs
Databases	NCBI: entry; OMA: entry
Species	Human	Mouse
Entrez	912	12479
Ensembl	ENSG00000158473	ENSMUSG00000028076
UniProt	P15813	P11609
RefSeq (mRNA)	NM_001766; NM_001319145; NM_001371761; NM_001371762; NM_001371763	NM_007639; NM_001379501; NM_001379502; NM_001379503
RefSeq (protein)	NP_001306074; NP_001757; NP_001358690; NP_001358691; NP_001358692	NP_031665; NP_001366430; NP_001366431; NP_001366432
Location (UCSC)	Chr 1: 158.18 – 158.19 Mb	Chr 3: 86.9 – 86.91 Mb
PubMed search
- Wikidata
View/Edit Human	View/Edit Mouse

CD1D is the human gene that encodes the protein CD1d, a member of the CD1 (cluster of differentiation 1) family of glycoproteins expressed on the surface of various human antigen-presenting cells. They are non-classical MHC proteins, related to the class I MHC proteins, and are involved in the presentation of lipid antigens to T cells. CD1d is the only member of the group 2 CD1 molecules.

== Biological significance ==
CD1d-presented lipid antigens activate a special class of T cells, known as natural killer T (NKT) cells, through the interaction with the T-cell receptor present on NKT membranes. When activated, NKT cells rapidly produce Th1 and Th2 cytokines, typically represented by interferon-gamma and interleukin 4 production.

CD1d also regulates lipid transport to macrophages which express CD36 on their surfaces.

== Nomenclature ==
CD1d is also known as R3G1

== Ligands ==
Some of the known ligands for CD1d are:

- α-galactosylceramide (α-GalCer), a compound originally derived from the marine sponge Agelas mauritanius with no physiological role but great research utility.
- α-glucuronyl- and α-galacturonyl- ceramides, a family of compounds of microbial origin which can be found, for example, on the cell wall of Sphingomonas, a ubiquitous Gram-negative bacterium. The related β-D-glucopyranosylceramide is accumulated in antigen-presenting cells after infection, where it serves to activate invariant NKTs (iNKTs), a special kind of NKT.
- iGb3, a self antigen which has been implied in iNKT selection.
- HS44, a synthetic amino cyclitolic ceramide analogue which has less contact with the TCR, activating iNKTs in a more constrained way than α-GalCer (specially in relation to Th2 cytokines production) and thus being more interesting for therapeutic use.

== Tetramers ==
CD1d tetramers are protein constructs composed of four CD1d molecules joined together and usually fluorescently labelled, used to identify NKT cells or other CD1d-reactive cells. In particular, type I NKT cells and some type II NKT cells are stained by them. A differentiation of these two types can be obtained in human by using an antibody against the TCR Vα24 chain, which is specific of type I NKT cells.

Although they are the most widely used of CD1d oligomers, sometimes CD1d dimers (two units) or pentamers (five units) are used instead.

== In obesity and type 2 diabetes ==
In obesity, NKT cells exhibit both an inflammatory and anti-inflammatory function. On the one hand, they release IFN-γ, but on the other hand, they reduce inflammation via the production of IL-4 and -10.

Despite the anti-inflammatory cytokines released by NKT cells, the overall effect of CD1d and NKT cells is that of mediating the inflammation caused by diet-induced obesity. Adipocyte-specific CD1d knock-out mice, when fed a high-fat diet, are protected from obesity and exhibit reduced adipose tissue inflammation.

Obesity itself also decreases the expression of CD1d, and mice fed a high-fat diet showed reduced levels of CD1d expression in adipocytes after 16 weeks. These data suggest that differentiated adipocytes could act as antigen-presenting cells for adipose iNKT cells and that reduced expression of CD1d might be associated with iNKT cells that have been dysregulated following diet-induced obesity.

Research from 2004 showed that iNKT cell counts may be reduced in diabetes type II. Transgenic non-obese mice in which CD1d molecules were overexpressed under the control of the insulin promoter within the pancreatic islets exhibited restored function of NKT cells as immunoregulatory. Diabetes was prevented in these transgenic mice.

CD1d has been shown to play an important role in metabolic biological processes, such as retinol metabolism and steroid hormone biosynthesis process activation. There is research that suggests a connection between the impaired activity of CD1d and MASLD. One study showed that feeding CD1d knock-out mice a high-fat diet impaired lipid metabolism in the liver.
