= Cytokine-induced killer cell =

Cytokine-induced killer cells (CIK) cells are a group of immune effector cells featuring a mixed T- and natural killer (NK) cell-like phenotype. They are generated by ex vivo incubation of human peripheral blood mononuclear cells (PBMC) or cord blood mononuclear cells with interferon-gamma (IFN-γ), anti-CD3 antibody, recombinant human interleukin (IL)-1 and recombinant human interleukin (IL)-2.

Typically, immune cells detect major histocompatibility complex (MHC) presented on infected cell surfaces, triggering cytokine release, causing lysis or apoptosis. However, CIK cells have the ability to recognize infected or even malignant cells in the absence of antibodies and MHC, allowing for a fast and unbiased immune reaction. This is of particular importance as harmful cells that are missing MHC markers cannot be tracked and attacked by other immune cells, such as T-lymphocytes. As a special feature, terminally differentiated CD3+CD56+ CIK cells possess the capacity for both MHC-restricted and MHC-unrestricted anti-tumor cytotoxicity. These properties, inter alia, rendered CIK cells attractive as a potential therapy for cancer and viral infections.

A new subclass of NK cells have been created both in vitro and in vivo. These NK cells referred to as cytokine induced memory-like natural killer cells are induced using cytokines, most commonly a mix of IL-12, IL-15, and IL-18. These NK cells are activated by these cytokines to stimulate an infection and induce an adaptive immune response. If cocultured with target cells such as tumor targets, these NK cells have memory-like abilities and are more adapt and effective at mounting a defense.

== Nomenclature ==
They were given the name "cytokine-induced killer" because cultivation with certain cytokines is mandatory for the maturation into terminally differentiated CIK cells. Several sources also call them natural killer cell-like T cells due to their close relationship to NK cells. Others propose to classify CIK cells as subset of NKT cells.

== Mechanism ==
It has been shown that lymphocytes, when exposed to interferon-gamma, anti-CD3 antibody, interleukin-1 and interleukin 2, are capable of lysing fresh, non-cultured cancer cells, both primary and metastatic. CIK cells respond to these lymphokines, particularly IL-2, by lysing tumor cells that were already known to be resistant to NK cell or LAK cell activity.

Peripheral blood mononuclear cells or cord blood mononuclear cells are extracted from either peripheral blood or cord blood, e.g. by simple blood draw. Extracted cells are ex-vivo exposed to interferon-gamma, anti-CD3 antibody, interleukin-1 and interleukin-2 in a time-sensitive schedule. These cytokines strongly stimulate the proliferation and maturation into CIK cells. After completed maturation CIK cells are transfused to the donor in autologous settings or to different recipients in allogeneic settings. Furthermore, it has been shown that CIK cells have a relevant expression of FcγRIIIa (CD16a), which can be exploited in combination with clinical-grade mAbs to redirect their activity in an antigen-specific manner. Indeed, the engagement of CD16a on CD3+CD56+ cells led to a potent antibody-dependent cell–mediated cytotoxicity (ADCC) both in vitro and in vivo against ovarian cancer. Recently, it has been demonstrated the efficacy of a combined approach (CIK + Cetuximab) against triple negative breast cancer (TNBC), an aggressive tumor that still requires therapeutic options. Different primitive and metastatic TNBC cancer mouse models were established in mice, and the treatment CIK cells plus cetuximab significantly restrained primitive tumor growth in mice, either in patient-derived tumor xenografts or MDA-MB-231 cell line models. Moreover, this approach almost completely abolished metastasis spreading and dramatically improved survival. The antigen-specific mAb favored tumor and metastasis tissue infiltration by CIK cells, and led to an enrichment of the CD16a+ subset. Data highlight the potentiality of this novel immunotherapy strategy where a nonspecific cytotoxic cell population can be converted into tumor-specific effectors with clinical-grade antibodies, thus providing not only a therapeutic option for TNBC but also a valid alternative to more complex approaches based on chimeric antigen receptor-engineered cells.

== Function ==
The mechanism of CIK cells is distinctive from that of natural killer cells or LAK cells because they can lyse cells that NK cells and LAK cells cannot.

CIK cells have, as a key feature, a double T-cell and NK cell-like phenotype. This unique combination of T-cell and NK-cell capabilities exerts a potent and widely MHC-unrestricted anti-tumor cytotoxicity against a broad range of cancer cells. Up to now the exact mechanisms of tumor recognition and targeted cytotoxicity of CIK cells is not fully understood. Besides recognition via TCR/CD3, NK-cell-like tumor recognition is mediated by cell-cell contact-dependent NKG2D, DNAM-1 and NKp30. These receptors and surface markers confer the capability of acting against cells that do not display the major histocompatibility complex, as has been shown by the ability to cause lysis in non-immunogenic, allogeneic and syngeneic tumors. Particularly solid and hematologic tumor cells tend to overexpress NKG2D ligands, making them a sought target of CIK cell-mediated cytolysis. Recognition is specific to tumor and virus infected cells as CIK cells do not display activity against healthy cells.

Immunomodulatory Tregs were shown to inhibit CIK cell function.

== Cancer Treatment ==
CIK cells, along with the administration of IL-2 have been experimentally used to treat cancer in mice and humans with low toxicity.

=== Clinical trials ===
In a large number of phase I and phase II studies, autologous and allogeneic CIK cells displayed a high cytotoxic potential against a broad range of varying tumor entities, whereas side effects were only minor. In many cases, CIK cell treatment led to complete remissions of tumor burden, prolonged survival durations and improved quality of life, even in advanced disease stages. Currently, the utilization of CIK cell treatment is restricted to clinical studies, but this therapeutic approach might also benefit patients as first-line treatment modality in the future.

=== International Registry on CIK Cells (IRCC) ===
The international registry on CIK cells (IRCC) was founded in 2011 as an independent organization, dedicated to collect data about clinical trials utilizing CIK cells and subsequent analysis to determine the latest state of clinical CIK cell research. A particular focus is thereby the evaluation of CIK cell efficacy in clinical trials and side effects.

=== International Society of CIK Cells (ISCC) ===
The International Society of Cytokine-induced killer cells (ISCC) was founded in 2024 to promote the networking of people who develop and research treatment therapies with CIK cells. In general, the members of the society aim to improve treatment options for cancer patients.

== Future trends ==
In studies, researchers succeeded in the transfection of cells ex-vivo with cytokine-genes, e.g. IL-2. Gene-modified CIK cells showed an increased proliferation rate and enhanced toxicity. Gene-transfected CIK cells were first applied in 1999 for the treatment of ten patients in metastatic state of disease.

Evidence is growing that the interaction with dendritic cells (DC) or rather vaccinated DCs further improves the anti-tumor efficacy of CIK cells and joint cultivation additionally reduces the number of Tregs within the CIK cell culture, resulting in enhanced expansion and frequency of CD3+CD56+ cells in the amplified cell population.

In-vitro studies revealed that CIK cells, redirected by chimeric antigen receptors with an antibody-defined specificity for different tumor antigens, showed an improved selectivity and activation in targeting antigen-presenting tumor cells.

In-vitro and in-vivo activity of CIK cells in conjunction with bispecific antibodies, cross-linking cytotoxic effector cells with malignant targets, was enhanced compared with CIK cells alone.

== History ==
CIK cells were first described by Ingo G.H. Schmidt-Wolf in 1991, who also performed the first clinical trial with CIK cells in the treatment of cancer patients in 1994.

== See also ==
- Natural killer cell
- Natural killer T cell
- Lymphokine-activated killer cell
- Interleukin
- Cancer immunotherapy
