= CD163 =

Protein found in humans

Identifiers
- Aliases: CD163, M130, MM130, SCARI1, CD163 molecule
- External IDs: OMIM: 605545; MGI: 2135946; GeneCards: CD163

Gene location (Human)
Chr.	Chromosome 12 (human)
Band	12p13.31	Start	7,470,811 bp
Band	12p13.31	End	7,503,893 bp

Gene location (Mouse)
Chr.	Chromosome 6 (mouse)
Band	6|6 F2	Start	124,281,615 bp
Band	6|6 F2	End	124,307,486 bp
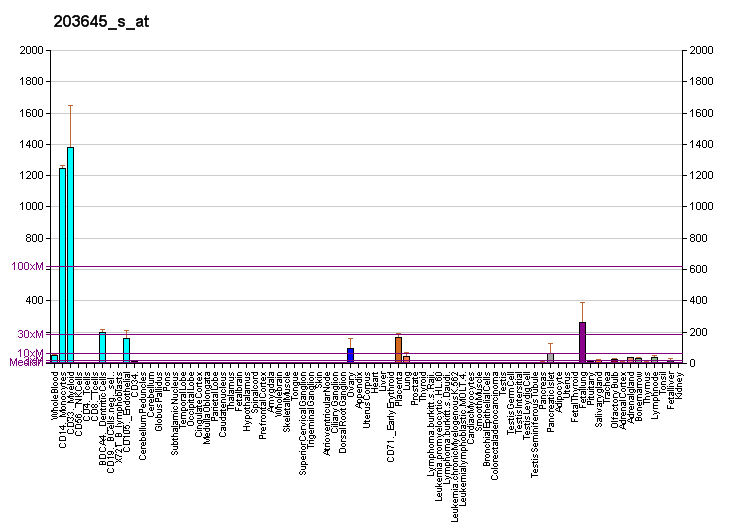

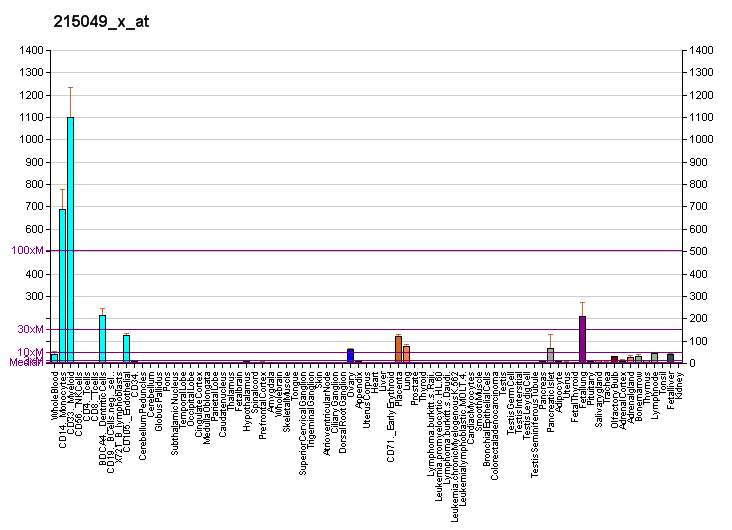
RNA expression pattern
Bgee	Human / Mouse (ortholog); Top expressed in: right lung; gastric mucosa; lower lobe of lung; right adrenal cortex; spleen; left adrenal cortex; monocyte; left uterine tube; right coronary artery; pericardium / Top expressed in: stroma of bone marrow; lumbar spinal ganglion; aortic valve; skin of external ear; ascending aorta; sciatic nerve; white adipose tissue; intercostal muscle; ankle; tunica adventitia of aorta; More reference expression data
BioGPS	More reference expression data
Gene ontology
Molecular function	scavenger receptor activity; protein binding
Cellular component	integral component of membrane; extracellular region; endocytic vesicle membrane; integral component of plasma membrane; membrane; plasma membrane; external side of plasma membrane
Biological process	inflammatory response; acute-phase response; receptor-mediated endocytosis
Sources:Amigo / QuickGO
Orthologs
Databases	NCBI: entry; OMA: entry
Species	Human	Mouse
Entrez	9332	93671
Ensembl	ENSG00000177575	ENSMUSG00000008845
UniProt	Q86VB7	Q2VLH6
RefSeq (mRNA)	NM_004244; NM_203416; NM_001370145; NM_001370146	NM_001170395; NM_053094
RefSeq (protein)	NP_004235; NP_981961; NP_001357074; NP_001357075	NP_001163866; NP_444324
Location (UCSC)	Chr 12: 7.47 – 7.5 Mb	Chr 6: 124.28 – 124.31 Mb
PubMed search
- Wikidata
View/Edit Human	View/Edit Mouse

CD163 (Cluster of Differentiation 163) is a protein that in humans is encoded by the CD163 gene. CD163 is the high affinity scavenger receptor for the hemoglobin-haptoglobin complex and in the absence of haptoglobin - with lower affinity - for hemoglobin alone. It also is a marker of cells from the monocyte/macrophage lineage. CD163 functions as innate immune sensor for gram-positive and gram-negative bacteria. The receptor was discovered in 1987.

== Structure ==
The molecular size is 130 kDa. The receptor belongs to the scavenger receptor cysteine rich family type B and consists of a 1048 amino acid residues extracellular domain, a single transmembrane segment and a cytoplasmic tail with several splice variants.

== Clinical significance ==
A soluble form of the receptor exists in plasma, and cerebrospinal fluid., commonly denoted sCD163. It is generated by ectodomain shedding of the membrane bound receptor, which may represent a form of modulation of CD163 function. sCD163 shedding occurs as a result of enzymatic cleavage by ADAM17. sCD163 is upregulated in a large range of inflammatory diseases including liver cirrhosis, type 2 diabetes, macrophage activation syndrome, Gaucher's disease, sepsis, HIV infection, rheumatoid arthritis and Hodgkin lymphoma. sCD163 is also upregulated in cerebrospinal fluid after subarachnoid haemorrhage. CD163 has recently been identified as expressed on neurons in the CNS following hemorrhage, although the significance of this is unclear. The excretion of soluble CD163 into the urine is tightly associated with the presence of active glomerulonephritis in systemic lupus erythematosus and ANCA vasculitis and can be used to track response to therapy.

== Differences between mouse and human ==
Differences between mice and humans in CD163 biology are important to note since preclinical studies are frequently conducted in mice. sCD163 shedding occurs in humans but not mice, due to the emergence of an Arg-Ser-Ser-Arg sequence in humans, essential for enzymatic cleavage by ADAM17. Human CD163, but not mouse CD163, exhibits a strikingly higher affinity to hemoglobin-haptoglobin complex compared to hemoglobin alone.

== Animal studies ==
Pigs with a section of the CD163 gene removed showed complete resistance to the virus that causes Porcine Reproductive and Respiratory Syndrome.

== Interactions ==
CD163 has been shown to interact with CSNK2B.

== See also ==
- Cluster of differentiation
