= Natural killer T cell =

T cells with some properties of natural killer cells

Natural killer T (NKT) cells are a heterogeneous group of T cells that recognise self and foreign lipids and glycolipids presented by CD1d, a non-polymorphic antigen-presenting molecule. They were originally described as expressing characteristics of both T and natural killer cells. Natural killer T cells are a distinct type of cells and should not be confused with natural killer cells or killer T cells (cytotoxic T cells). They constitute only approximately 1% of all peripheral blood T cells. Their function is to produce and release cytokines, kill other cells, and communicate with other cells in the immune system. They have been found to play a role in various autoimmune diseases.

== Nomenclature ==
The term "NK T cells" was first used in mice to define a subset of T cells that expressed the natural killer (NK) cell-associated marker NK1.1 (CD161). It is now generally accepted that the term "NKT cells" refers to CD1d-restricted T cells, present in mice and humans, some of which coexpress a heavily biased, semi-invariant T-cell receptor and NK cell markers.

== Molecular characterization ==
NKT cells are a subset of T cells that coexpress an αβ T-cell receptor, but also express a variety of molecular markers that are typically associated with NK cells, such as NK1.1. The best-known NKT cells differ from conventional αβ T cells in that their T-cell receptors are far more limited in diversity ('invariant' or 'type 1' NKT). They and other CD1d-restricted T cells ('type 2' NKT) recognize lipids and glycolipids presented by CD1d molecules, a member of the CD1 family of antigen-presenting molecules, rather than peptide-major histocompatibility complexes (MHCs). As such, NKT cells are important in recognizing glycolipids from organisms such as Mycobacterium, which causes tuberculosis.

NKT cells include both NK1.1^{+} and NK1.1^{−}, as well as CD4^{+}, CD4^{−}, CD8^{+} and CD8^{−} cells. Natural killer T cells can share other features with NK cells, as well, such as CD16 and CD56 expression and granzyme production.

Invariant natural killer T (iNKT) cells express high levels of and are dependent on the transcriptional regulator promyelocytic leukemia zinc finger for their development.

== Classification ==
Classification of natural killer T cells into three groups has been proposed:

| | Type 1 NKT | Type 2 NKT | NKT-like |
| Other names | classical NKT invariant NKT (iNKT) Vα14i NKT (mouse) Vα24i NKT (human) | non-classical NKT diverse NKT | NK1.1^{+} T cells CD3^{+} CD56^{+} T cells |
| Restriction | CD1d | CD1d | MHC, other? |
| α-GalCer reactivity | + | - | - |
| T-cell-receptor repertoire | Vα14-Jα18: Vβ8.2, 7, 2 (mouse) Vα24-Jα18: Vβ11 (human) | diverse | diverse |

== Development ==
NKT cells differentiate into effector cells in the thymus unlike conventional T cells which differentiate into effector subpopulations in secondary lymphoid organs. Following the same developmental process as T cells in the thymus, the precursor to NKT cells undergoes four double negative stages and rearranges its beta-chain at stage three. At this stage, the immature thymocytes lack both CD4 and CD8 markers. After undergoing checks for proper TCR development, they move on to double positive selection.

It is believed the precursor cells to NKT cells undergo CD1d-dependent positive selection where the CD1d molecule with the lipid iGb3 interacts with the TCR of a CD4^{+}CD8^{+} cell. However, due to evidence suggesting that humans lack the enzyme required to synthesize the lipid iGb3, there are doubts about the importance of this molecule for NKT cell development.

NKT cell differentiation also requires a signaling lymphocytic activation molecule (SLAM) interacting with the SLAM of another NKT cell. SLAM-SLAM interactions are important for costimulation for NKT cells to differentiate.

When the TCR gets bound the NKT thymus precursor receives elevated TCR signaling leading to the upregulation of the transcription factor Egr2. Upregulation of Egr2 thus leads to the activation of PLZF, a transcription factor that binds to genes responsible for transcription factors regulating cytokine production. PLZF is important for transcription factors related to cytokine production, including IFN-gamma, IL-4, and IL-3. It binds genes: Gata3, Maf, Runx3, Rorc. PLZF induces cells to differentiate into iNKT cells through changing their function by the cytokines it can express.

The linear differentiation model of NKT cells starts with the NKT cell precursor at stage zero where it undergoes positive selection. This model requires all NKT cells to undergo the four stages before it can terminally differentiate. Stages one through three are where the cells undergo division and acquire different surface markers.

However, the lineage differentiation model presents an alternative pathway through which NKT cells end up as the subsets NKT1, NKT2, and NK17. This pathway doesn’t require cells to undergo through the four stages of development. A population of thymic T cells before stage zero can develop into any of the three differentiated iNKT subpopulations.

== Invariant NKT (iNKT) cells ==
The best-known subset of CD1d-dependent NKT cells are invariant NKT cells, also known as Type I or iNKT. This subset expresses an invariant T-cell receptor (TCR) α chain. They are notable for their ability to respond rapidly to danger signals and pro-inflammatory cytokines. Once activated, they engage in effector functions, like NK transactivation, T cell activation and differentiation, B cell activation, dendritic cell activation and cross-presentation activity, and macrophage activation.

iNKT cells recognize lipid antigens presented by CD1d, a non-polymorphic major histocompatibility complex class I-like antigen presenting molecule. These cells are conserved between humans and mice. The highly conserved TCR is made of Va24-Ja18 paired with Vb11 in humans, which is specific for glycolipid antigens. The best known antigen of iNKT cells is alpha-galactosylceramide (αGalCer), which is a synthetic form of a chemical purified from the deep sea sponge Agelas mauritianus. iNKT cells develop in the thymus, and distribute to the periphery. They are most commonly found in the liver, but are also found in the thymus, spleen, peripheral blood, bone marrow and fat tissue. In comparison to mice, humans have fewer iNKT cells and have a wide variation in the amount of circulating iNKT cells.

Currently, there are five major distinct iNKT cell subsets. They have been categorized based on their transcription factors and the cytokines they produce once activated. The subtypes iNKT1, iNKT2 and iNKT17 mirror Th Cell subsets in cytokine production. In addition there are subtypes specialized in T follicular helper-like function and IL-10 dependent regulatory functions. Once activated iNKT cells can impact the type and strength of an immune response. They engage in cross talk with other immune cells, like dendritic cells, neutrophils and lymphocytes. Activation occurs by engagement with their invariant TCR. iNKT cells can also be indirectly activated through cytokine signaling.

While iNKT cells are not very numerous, their unique properties makes them an important regulatory cell that can influence how the immune system develops. They are known to play a role in chronic inflammatory diseases like autoimmune disease, asthma and metabolic syndrome. In human autoimmune diseases, their numbers are decreased in peripheral blood. It is not clear whether this is a cause or effect of the disease. Absence of microbe exposure in early development led to increased iNKT cells and immune morbidity in a mouse model.

== Function ==
Upon activation, NKT cells are able to produce large quantities of interferon gamma, IL-4, and granulocyte-macrophage colony-stimulating factor, as well as multiple other cytokines and chemokines (such as IL-2, IL-13, IL-17, IL-21, and TNF-alpha).

NKT cells recognize protected microbial lipid agents which are presented by CD1d-expressing antigen presenting cells. This serves as a pathway for NKT cells to fight against infections and enhance the humoral immunity. The NKT cells provide support and help to B cells which act as a microbial defense and aid in targeting for B-cell vaccines.

== Significance ==
NKT cells seem to be essential for several aspects of immunity because their dysfunction or deficiency has been shown to lead to the development of autoimmune diseases such as diabetes, autoinflammatory diseases such as atherosclerosis, and cancers. NKT cells have recently been implicated in the disease progression of human asthma.

The clinical potential of NKT cells lies in the rapid release of cytokines (such as IL-2, IFN-gamma, TNF-alpha, and IL-4) that promote or suppress different immune responses.

Most clinical trials with NKT cells have been performed with cytokine-induced killer cells (CIK).

== See also ==
- Cytotoxic T cell (killer T cell)
- List of distinct cell types in the adult human body
