= MSR1 =

Protein-coding gene in the species Homo sapiens

Identifiers
- Aliases: MSR1, CD204, SCARA1, SR-A, SRA, phSR1, phSR2, macrophage scavenger receptor 1, SR-AI, SR-AII, SR-AIII
- External IDs: OMIM: 153622; MGI: 98257; GeneCards: MSR1

Gene location (Human)
Chr.	Chromosome 8 (human)
Band	8p22	Start	16,107,878 bp
Band	8p22	End	16,567,490 bp

Gene location (Mouse)
Chr.	Chromosome 8 (mouse)
Band	8 A4|8 23.89 cM	Start	40,034,726 bp
Band	8 A4|8 23.89 cM	End	40,095,714 bp
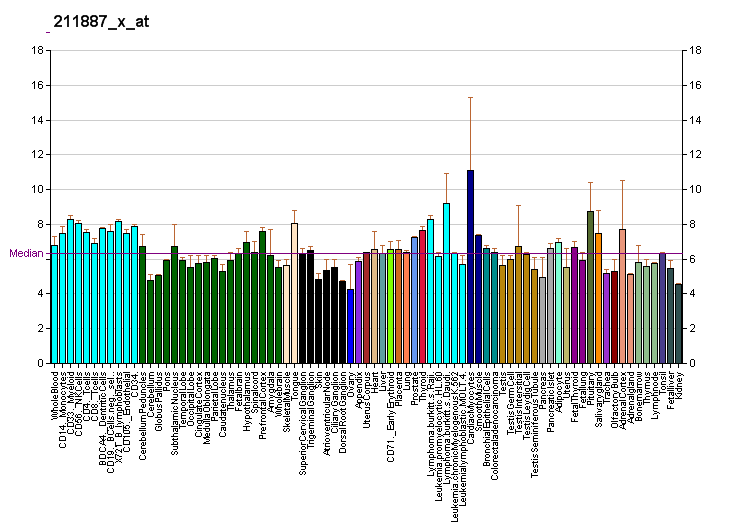

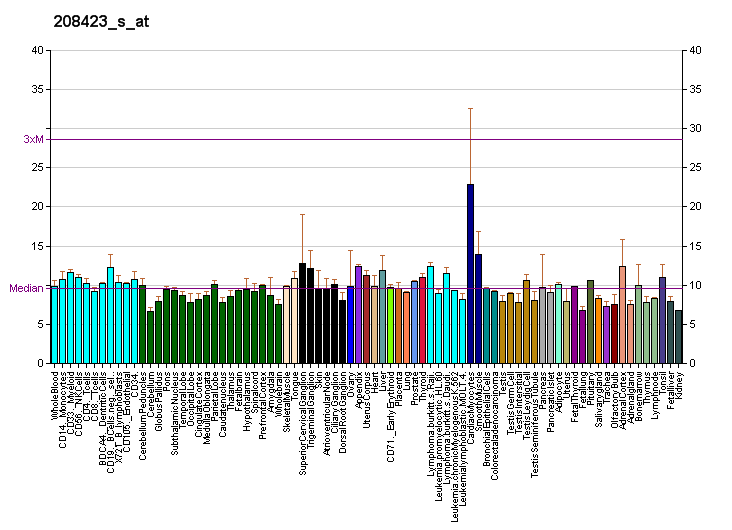

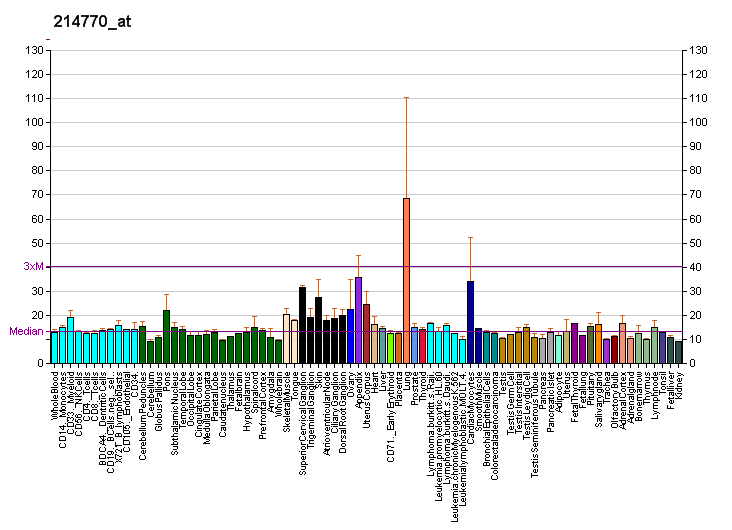
RNA expression pattern
Bgee	Human / Mouse (ortholog); Top expressed in: right lung; upper lobe of left lung; gallbladder; Achilles tendon; right coronary artery; visceral pleura; Descending thoracic aorta; monocyte; testicle; ascending aorta / Top expressed in: stroma of bone marrow; spermatid; molar; mesenteric lymph nodes; gastrula; liver; seminiferous tubule; left lobe of liver; submandibular gland; sciatic nerve; More reference expression data
BioGPS	More reference expression data
Gene ontology
Molecular function	scavenger receptor activity; protein binding; low-density lipoprotein particle binding; amyloid-beta binding; cargo receptor activity
Cellular component	integral component of membrane; endocytic vesicle membrane; cytosol; plasma membrane; collagen; integral component of plasma membrane; membrane; low-density lipoprotein particle; cytoplasmic vesicle
Biological process	cholesterol transport; plasma lipoprotein particle clearance; cellular response to organic cyclic compound; positive regulation of macrophage derived foam cell differentiation; endocytosis; receptor-mediated endocytosis; lipoprotein transport; positive regulation of cholesterol storage; phagocytosis, engulfment; negative regulation of gene expression; amyloid-beta clearance
Sources:Amigo / QuickGO
Orthologs
Databases	NCBI: entry; OMA: entry
Species	Human	Mouse
Entrez	4481	20288
Ensembl	ENSG00000038945	ENSMUSG00000025044
UniProt	P21757	P30204
RefSeq (mRNA)	NM_138716; NM_002445; NM_138715; NM_001363744	NM_001113326; NM_031195
RefSeq (protein)	NP_002436; NP_619729; NP_619730; NP_001350673	NP_001106797; NP_112472
Location (UCSC)	Chr 8: 16.11 – 16.57 Mb	Chr 8: 40.03 – 40.1 Mb
PubMed search
- Wikidata
View/Edit Human	View/Edit Mouse

Macrophage scavenger receptor 1, also known as MSR1, is a protein which in humans is encoded by the MSR1 gene. MSR1 has also been designated CD204 (cluster of differentiation 204).

== Function ==
This gene encodes the class A macrophage scavenger receptors, which include three different types (1, 2, 3) generated by alternative splicing of this gene. These receptors or isoforms are trimeric integral membrane glycoproteins and have been implicated in many macrophage-associated physiological and pathological processes including atherosclerosis, Alzheimer's disease, and host defense. They were thought to be expressed macrophage-specific, but recently shown to be present on different dendritic cells classes, too.

The isoforms type 1 and type 2 are functional receptors and are able to mediate the endocytosis of modified low density lipoproteins (LDLs). The isoform type 3 does not internalize modified LDL (acetyl-LDL) despite having the domain shown to mediate this function in the types 1 and 2 isoforms. It has an altered intracellular processing and is trapped within the endoplasmic reticulum, making it unable to perform endocytosis. The isoform type 3 can inhibit the function of isoforms type 1 and type 2 when co-expressed, indicating a dominant negative effect and suggesting a mechanism for regulation of scavenger receptor activity in macrophages.

== Biotechnology application ==
Macrophage scavenger receptor has been shown to mediate adhesion of macrophages and other cell lines to tissue culture plastic.

== Interactions ==
MSR1 has been shown to interact with HSPA1A.
