= CD36 =

Mammalian protein found in humans

Identifiers
- Aliases: CD36, BDPLT10, CHDS7, FAT, GP3B, GP4, GPIV, PASIV, SCARB3, CD36 molecule
- External IDs: OMIM: 173510; MGI: 107899; GeneCards: CD36

Gene location (Human)
| Chr. | Chromosome 7 (human) |
| Band | 7q21.11 | Start | 80,369,575 bp |
| Band | 7q21.11 | End | 80,679,277 bp |

Gene location (Mouse)
| Chr. | Chromosome 5 (mouse) |
| Band | 5 A3|5 8.11 cM | Start | 17,986,688 bp |
| Band | 5 A3|5 8.11 cM | End | 18,093,799 bp |
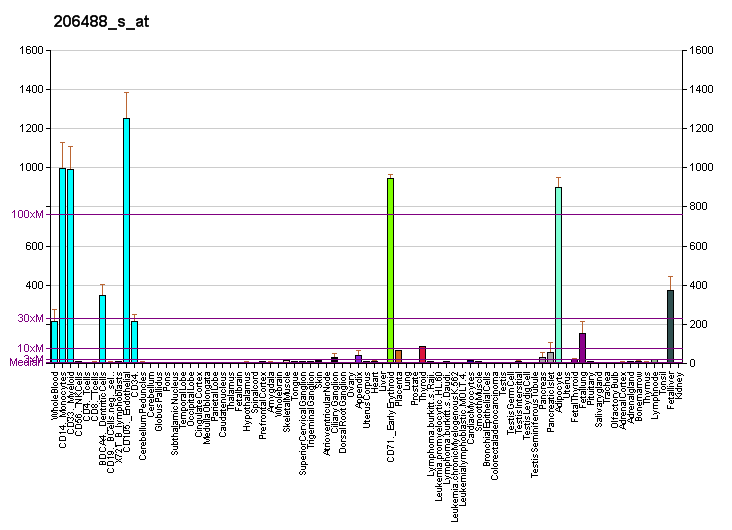
RNA expression pattern
| Bgee | Human / Mouse (ortholog); Top expressed in: abdominal fat; monocyte; jejunal mucosa; right ventricle; subcutaneous adipose tissue; myocardium of left ventricle; apex of heart; skin of hip; right auricle of heart; vena cava / Top expressed in: right lung; right lung lobe; left lung; left lung lobe; tunica adventitia of aorta; stroma of bone marrow; intercostal muscle; right ventricle; right kidney; digastric muscle; More reference expression data |
| BioGPS | More reference expression data |
Gene ontology
| Molecular function | protein binding; low-density lipoprotein particle receptor activity; transforming growth factor beta binding; high-density lipoprotein particle binding; lipoprotein particle binding; thrombospondin receptor activity; lipid binding; low-density lipoprotein particle binding; lipoteichoic acid immune receptor activity; amyloid-beta binding; scavenger receptor activity; Toll-like receptor binding; oxidised low-density lipoprotein particle receptor activity; protein-containing complex binding |
| Cellular component | Golgi apparatus; apical plasma membrane; phagocytic vesicle; apical part of cell; brush border membrane; endocytic vesicle membrane; integral component of plasma membrane; membrane; external side of plasma membrane; integral component of membrane; platelet alpha granule membrane; membrane raft; cell surface; plasma membrane; extracellular space; specific granule membrane; intracellular anatomical structure; receptor complex |
| Biological process | low-density lipoprotein particle mediated signaling; apoptotic cell clearance; positive regulation of MAPK cascade; response to lipid; nitric oxide mediated signal transduction; intestinal absorption; positive regulation of blood microparticle formation; positive regulation of blood coagulation; plasma lipoprotein particle clearance; sensory perception of taste; blood coagulation; cellular response to hydroperoxide; positive regulation of ERK1 and ERK2 cascade; receptor internalization; cellular response to bacterial lipopeptide; amyloid fibril formation; cellular response to lipopolysaccharide; cell surface receptor signaling pathway; antigen processing and presentation of exogenous peptide antigen via MHC class I, TAP-dependent; cholesterol transport; platelet degranulation; cholesterol import; cellular response to diacyl bacterial lipopeptide; negative regulation of transcription by RNA polymerase II; transport; toll-like receptor TLR6:TLR2 signaling pathway; phagocytosis, recognition; cellular response to low-density lipoprotein particle stimulus; positive regulation of macrophage cytokine production; immune response; response to linoleic acid; negative regulation of gene expression; positive regulation of reactive oxygen species metabolic process; lipoprotein transport; positive regulation of cell-matrix adhesion; positive regulation of interleukin-12 production; triglyceride transport; long-chain fatty acid import into cell; MyD88-dependent toll-like receptor signaling pathway; response to fatty acid; regulation of removal of superoxide radicals; cellular response to lipoteichoic acid; positive regulation of cholesterol storage; intestinal cholesterol absorption; positive regulation of tumor necrosis factor production; receptor-mediated endocytosis; lipid metabolism; cGMP-mediated signaling; positive regulation of phagocytosis, engulfment; defense response to Gram-positive bacterium; positive regulation of cytosolic calcium ion concentration; positive regulation of interleukin-6 production; positive regulation of peptidyl-tyrosine phosphorylation; positive regulation of I-kappaB kinase/NF-kappaB signaling; response to stilbenoid; positive regulation of NLRP3 inflammasome complex assembly; low-density lipoprotein particle clearance; lipid storage; positive regulation of macrophage derived foam cell differentiation; cell adhesion; toll-like receptor signaling pathway; neutrophil degranulation; regulation of lipid metabolic process; production of molecular mediator involved in inflammatory response; fatty acid metabolic process; phagocytosis, engulfment; response to bacterium; positive regulation of gene expression; positive regulation of cell death; cytokine-mediated signaling pathway; regulation of lipopolysaccharide-mediated signaling pathway; regulation of toll-like receptor signaling pathway; negative regulation of protein import into nucleus; regulation of protein heterodimerization activity; positive regulation of nitric oxide biosynthetic process; positive regulation of NF-kappaB transcription factor activity; energy homeostasis; regulation of action potential; positive regulation of cold-induced thermogenesis; cellular response to oxidised low-density lipoprotein particle stimulus; oxidised low-density lipoprotein particle clearance; amyloid-beta clearance by cellular catabolic process; positive regulation of reactive oxygen species biosynthetic process; cellular response to amyloid-beta |
Sources:Amigo / QuickGO
Orthologs
| Databases | NCBI: entry; OMA: entry |
| Species | Human | Mouse |
| Entrez | 948 | 12491 |
| Ensembl | ENSG00000135218 | ENSMUSG00000002944 |
| UniProt | P16671 | Q08857 |
| RefSeq (mRNA) | NM_000072; NM_001001547; NM_001001548; NM_001127443; NM_001127444 NM_001289908; NM_001289909; NM_001289911; NM_001371074; NM_001371075; NM_001371077; NM_001371078; NM_001371079; NM_001371080; NM_001371081 | NM_001159555; NM_001159556; NM_001159557; NM_001159558; NM_007643 |
| RefSeq (protein) | NP_000063; NP_001001547; NP_001001548; NP_001120915; NP_001120916 NP_001276837; NP_001276838; NP_001276840; NP_001358003; NP_001358004; NP_001358006; NP_001358007; NP_001358008; NP_001358009; NP_001358010 | NP_001153027; NP_001153028; NP_001153029; NP_001153030; NP_031669 |
| Location (UCSC) | Chr 7: 80.37 – 80.68 Mb | Chr 5: 17.99 – 18.09 Mb |
| PubMed search |
- Wikidata
| View/Edit Human | View/Edit Mouse |

CD36 (cluster of differentiation 36), also known as platelet glycoprotein 4, fatty acid translocase (FAT), scavenger receptor class B member 3 (SCARB3), and glycoproteins 88 (GP88), IIIb (GPIIIB), or IV (GPIV) is a protein that in humans is encoded by the CD36 gene. The CD36 antigen is an integral membrane protein found on the surface of many cell types in vertebrate animals. It imports fatty acids inside cells and is a member of the class B scavenger receptor family of cell surface proteins. CD36 binds many ligands including collagen, thrombospondin, erythrocytes parasitized with Plasmodium falciparum, oxidized low density lipoprotein, native lipoproteins, oxidized phospholipids, and long-chain fatty acids.

Work in genetically modified rodents suggest a role for CD36 in fatty acid metabolism, heart disease, taste, and dietary fat processing in the intestine. It may be involved in glucose intolerance, atherosclerosis, arterial hypertension, diabetes, cardiomyopathy, Alzheimer's disease and various cancers, mostly of epithelial origin (breast, prostate, ovary, and colon) and also for hepatic carcinoma and gliomas.

== Structure ==
=== Primary ===
In humans, rats and mice, CD36 consists of 472 amino acids with a predicted molecular weight of approximately 53,000 Da. However, CD36 is extensively glycosylated and has an apparent molecular weight of 88,000 Da as determined by SDS polyacrylamide gel electrophoresis.

=== Tertiary ===
Using Kyte–Doolittle analysis, the amino acid sequence of CD36 predicts a hydrophobic region near each end of the protein large enough to span cellular membranes. Based on this notion and the observation that CD36 is found on the surface of cells, CD36 is thought to have a 'hairpin-like' structure with α-helices at the C- and N- termini projecting through the membrane and a larger extracellular loop (Fig. 1). This topology is supported by transfection experiments in cultured cells using deletion mutants of CD36.

Based on the crystal structure of the homologous SCARB2, a model of the extracellular domain of CD36 has been produced. Like SCARB2, CD36 is proposed to contain an antiparallel β-barrel core with many short α-helices adorning it. The structure is predicted to contain a hydrophobic transport tunnel. Disulfide linkages between 4 of the 6 cysteine residues in the extracellular loop are required for efficient intracellular processing and transport of CD36 to the plasma membrane. It is not clear what role these linkages play on the function of the mature CD36 protein on the cell surface.

=== Posttranslational modification ===
Besides glycosylation, additional post-translational modifications have been reported for CD36. CD36 is modified with 4 palmitoyl chains, 2 on each of the two intracellular domains. The function of these lipid modifications is currently unknown but they likely promote the association of CD36 with the membrane and possibly lipid rafts which appear to be important for some CD36 functions. CD36 could be also phosphorylated at Y62, T92, T323, ubiquitinated at K56, K469, K472 and acetylated at K52, K56, K166, K231, K394, K398, K403.

=== Protein-protein interactions ===
In the absence of ligand, membrane bound CD36 exists primarily in a monomeric state. However exposure to the thrombospondin ligand causes CD36 to dimerize. This dimerization has been proposed to play an important role in CD36 signal transduction.

== Genetics ==
In humans, the gene is located on the long arm of chromosome 7 at band 11.2 (7q11.2) and is encoded by 15 exons that extend over more than 32 kilobases. Both the 5' and the 3' untranslated regions contain introns: the 5' with two and the 3' one. Exons 1, 2 and first 89 nucleotides of exon 3 and as well as exon 15 are non-coding. Exon 3 contains encodes the N-terminal cytoplasmic and transmembrane domains. The C-terminal cytoplasmic and transmembrane regions is encoded by exon 14. The extracellular domain is encoded by the central 11 exons. Alternative splicing of the untranslated regions gives rise to at least two mRNA species.

The transcription initiation site of the CD36 gene has been mapped to 289 nucleotides upstream from the translational start codon and a TATA box and several putative cis regulatory regions lie further 5'. A binding site for PEBP2/CBF factors has been identified between -158 and -90 and disruption of this site reduces expression. The gene is the transcriptional control of the nuclear receptor PPAR/RXR heterodimer (Peroxisome proliferator-activated receptor – Retinoid X receptor) and gene expression can be up regulated using synthetic and natural ligands for PPAR and RXR, including the thiazolidinedione class of anti-diabetic drugs and the vitamin A metabolite 9-cis-retinoic acid respectively.

== Tissue distribution ==
CD36 is found on platelets, erythrocytes, monocytes, differentiated adipocytes, skeletal muscle, mammary epithelial cells, spleen cells and some skin microdermal endothelial cells.

== Function ==
The protein itself belongs to the class B scavenger receptor family which includes receptors for selective cholesteryl ester uptake, scavenger receptor class B type I (SR-BI) and lysosomal integral membrane protein II (LIMP-II).

CD36 interacts with a number of ligands, including collagen types I and IV, thrombospondin, erythrocytes parasitized with Plasmodium falciparum, platelet-agglutinating protein p37, oxidized low density lipoprotein and long-chain fatty acids.

On macrophages CD36 forms part of a non-opsonic receptor (the scavenger receptor CD36/alpha-v beta-3 complex) and is involved in phagocytosis.

CD36 has also been implicated in hemostasis, thrombosis, malaria, inflammation, lipid metabolism and atherogenesis.

On binding a ligand the protein and ligand are internalized. This internalization is independent of macropinocytosis and occurs by an actin dependent mechanism requiring the activation Src-family kinases, JNK and Rho-family GTPases. Unlike macropinocytosis this process is not affected by inhibitors of phosphatidylinositol 3-kinase or Na^{+}/H^{+} exchange.

CD36 ligands have also been shown to promote sterile inflammation through assembly of a Toll-like receptor 4 and 6 heterodimer.

Recently, CD36 was linked to store-operated calcium flux, phospholipase A_{2} activation, and production of prostaglandin E_{2}

CD36 function in long-chain fatty acid uptake and signaling can be irreversibly inhibited by sulfo-N-succinimidyl oleate (SSO), which binds lysine 164 within a hydrophobic pocket shared by several CD36 ligands, e.g. fatty acid and oxLDL. Recent research concluded that CD36 is involved in the fat taste transduction (oleogustus).

== Clinical significance ==
=== Malaria ===
Infections with the human malaria parasite Plasmodium falciparum are characterized by sequestration of erythrocytes infected with mature forms of the parasite and CD36 has been shown to be a major sequestration receptor on microvascular endothelial cells. Parasitised erythrocytes adhere to endothelium at the trophozoite/schizonts stage simultaneous with the appearance of the var gene product (erythrocyte membrane protein 1) on the erythrocyte surface. The appearance of Plasmodium falciparum erythrocyte membrane protein 1 (PfEMP1) on the erythrocyte surface is a temperature dependent phenomenon which is due to increased protein trafficking to the erythrocyte surface at the raised temperature. PfEMP1 can bind other endothelial receptors - thrombospondin (TSP) and intercellular adhesion molecule 1 (ICAM-1) – in addition to CD36 - and genes other than PfEMP1 also bind to CD36: cytoadherence linked protein (clag) and sequestrin. The PfEMP1 binding site on CD36 is known to be located on exon 5.

CD36 on the surface of the platelets has been shown to be involved in adherence but direct adherence to the endothelium by the infected erythrocytes also occurs. Autoaggregation of infected erythrocytes by platelets has been shown to correlate with severe malaria and cerebral malaria in particular and antiplatelet antibodies may offer some protection.

Several lines of evidence suggest that mutations in CD36 are protective against malaria: mutations in the promoters and within introns and in exon 5 reduce the risk of severe malaria. Gene diversity studies suggest there has been positive selection on this gene presumably due to malarial selection pressure. Dissenting reports are also known suggesting that CD36 is not the sole determinant of severe malaria. In addition a role for CD36 has been found in the clearance of gametocytes (stages I and II).

CD36 has been shown to have a role in the innate immune response to malaria in mouse models. Compared with wild type mice CD36 (-/-) mice the cytokine induction response and parasite clearance were impaired. Earlier peak parasitemias, higher parasite densities and higher mortality were noted. It is thought that CD36 is involved in the Plasmodium falciparum glycophosphatidylinositol (PfGPI) induced MAPK activation and proinflammatory cytokine secretion. When macrophages were exposed to PfGPI the proteins ERK1/2, JNK, p38, and c-Jun became phosphorylated. All these proteins are involved as secondary messengers in the immune response. These responses were blunted in the CD36 (-/-) mice. Also in the CD36 (-/-) macrophages secreted significantly less TNF-alpha on exposure to PfGPI. Work is ongoing to determine how these exactly how these responses provide protection against malaria.

=== CD36 deficiency and alloimmune thrombocytopenia ===
CD36 is also known as glycoprotein IV (gpIV) or glycoprotein IIIb (gpIIIb) in platelets and gives rise to the Naka antigen. The Naka null phenotype is found in 0.3% of Caucasians and appears to be asymptomatic. The null phenotype is more common in African (2.5%), Japanese, and other Asian populations (5-11%).

Mutations in the human CD36 gene were first identified in a patient who, despite multiple platelet transfusions, continued to exhibit low platelet levels. This condition is known as refractoriness to platelet transfusion. Subsequent studies have shown that CD36 found on the surface of platelets. This antigen is recognized by the monoclonal antibodies (MAbs) OKM5 and OKM8. It is bound by the Plasmodium falciparum protein sequestrin.

Depending on the nature of the mutation in codon 90 CD36 may be absent either on both platelets and monocytes (type 1) or platelets alone (type 2). Type 2 has been divided into two subtypes - a and b. Deficiency restricted to the platelets alone is known as type 2a; if CD36 is also absent from the erythroblasts the phenotype is classified as type 2b. The molecular basis is known for some cases: T1264G in both Kenyans and Gambians; C478T (50%), 539 deletion of AC and 1159 insertion of an A, 1438-1449 deletion and a combined 839-841 deletion GAG and insertion of AAAAC in Japanese.

In a study of 827 apparently healthy Japanese volunteers, type I and II deficiencies were found in 8 (1.0%) and 48 (5.8%) respectively. In 1127 healthy French blood donors (almost all of whom were white Europeans) no CD36 deficiency was found. In a second group only 1 of 301 white test subjects was found to be CD36 deficient. 16 of the 206 sub-Saharan black Africans and 1 of 148 black Caribbeans were found to be CD36 -ve. Three of 13 CD36 -ve persons examined had anti CD36 antibodies. In a group of 250 black American blood donors 6 (2.4%) were found to be Naka antigen negative.

CD36 deficiency may be a cause of post transfusion purpura.

=== Blood pressure ===
Below normal levels of CD36 expression in the kidneys has been implicated as a genetic risk factor for hypertension (high blood pressure).

=== Fatty acid uptake ===
An association with myocardial fatty acid uptake in humans has been noted. The data suggest a link between hypertrophic cardiomyopathy and CD36 but this needs to be confirmed.

=== Tuberculosis ===
RNAi screening in a Drosophila model has revealed that a member of the CD36 family is required for phagocytosis of Mycobacterium tuberculosis into macrophage phagosomes.

=== Toxoplasmosis ===
Avirulent strains of Toxoplasma gondii bind to CD36 but virulent parasites fail to engage CD36. In mice, CD36 is required for disease tolerance but not for the development of immunity or resistance.

=== Obesity ===
CD36's association with the ability to taste fats has made it a target for various studies regarding obesity and alteration of lipid tasting. CD36 mRNA expression was found to be reduced in taste bud cells (TBC) of obese sand rats (P. obesus) compared to lean controls, implicating an association between CD36 and obesity. Although actual levels of CD36 protein were not different between the obese and control rat cells, Abdoul-Azize et al. hypothesize that the physical distribution of CD36 could differ in obese rat cells. Changes in calcium mediation have been associated with CD36 and obesity as well. Taste bud cells (more specifically, cells from the circumvallate papillae) containing CD36 that were isolated from obese mice exhibited a significantly smaller increase in calcium after fatty acid stimulation when compared to control mice: CD36 associated calcium regulation is impaired when mice are made to be obese (but not in normal weight mice), and this could be a mechanism contributing to behavior changes in the obese mice, such as decreased lipid taste sensitivity and decreased attraction to fats.

There has been some investigation into human CD36 as well. A study examined oral detection of fat in obese subjects with genetic bases for high, medium, and low expression of the CD36 receptor. Those subjects with high CD36 expression were eight times more sensitive to certain fats (oleic acid and triolein) than the subjects with low CD36 expression. Those subjects with an intermediate amount of CD36 expression were sensitive to fat at a level between the high and low groups. This study demonstrates that there is a significant relationship between oral fat sensitivity and the amount of CD36 receptor expression, but further investigation into CD36 could be useful for learning more about lipid tasting in the context of obesity, as CD36 may be a target for therapies in the future.

=== Establishment of cellular senescence ===
Reducing the burden of senescent cells, or reducing their inflammatory secretome through CD36 neutralization, accelerates regeneration in young and old mice.

== Cancer ==
CD36 plays a role in the regulation of angiogenesis, which may be a therapeutic strategy for controlling the spread of cancer. Some data from in vitro and animal studies suggested that fatty acid uptake through CD36 may promote cancer cell migration and proliferation in hepatocellular carcinoma, glioblastoma, and potentially other cancers; there was limited data from observational studies in people that low CD36 may correlate with a slightly better outcome in glioblastoma.

== Interactions ==
CD36 has been shown to interact with FYN.

== Related proteins ==
CD36 family
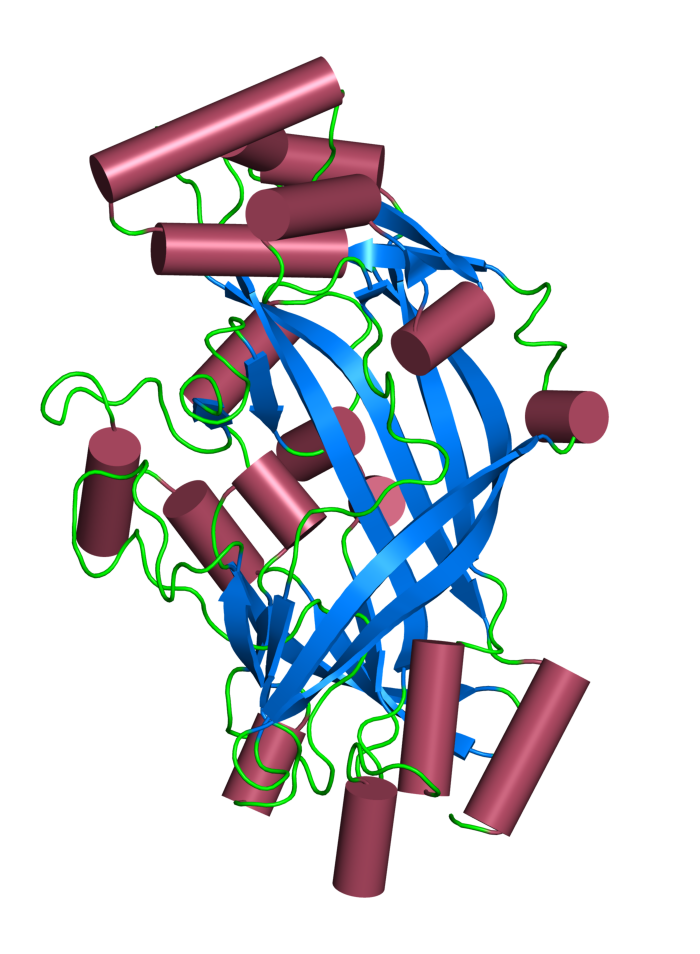
- Structure of Limp-II. PDB entry 4f7b

Identifiers
- Symbol: CD36
- Pfam: PF01130
- InterPro: IPR002159
Available protein structures:
- PDB: IPR002159 PF01130 (ECOD; PDBsum)
- AlphaFold: IPR002159; PF01130

Other human scavenger receptors related to CD36 are SCARB1 and SCARB2 proteins.

== See also ==
- Cluster of differentiation
- CD36 antigen
