= SCARB2 =

Protein-coding gene in the species Homo sapiens

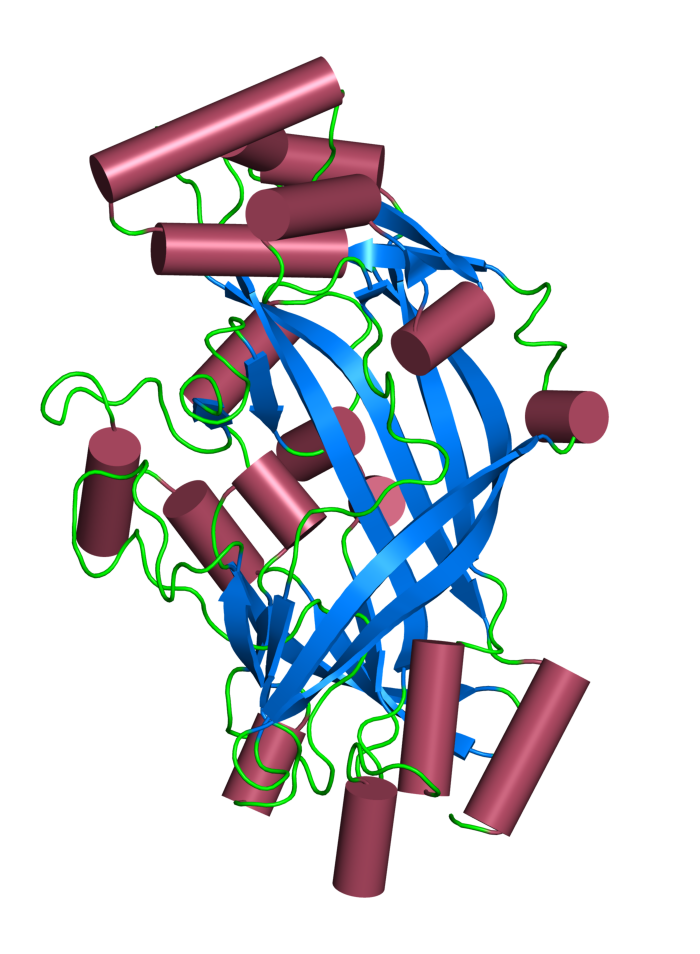
Available structures
PDB	Ortholog search: PDBe RCSB
PDB	List of PDB id codes 4F7B, 4Q4B, 4Q4F, 4TVZ, 4TW0, 4TW2

Identifiers
- Aliases: SCARB2, AMRF, CD36L2, EPM4, HLGP85, LGP85, LIMP-2, LIMPII, SR-BII, scavenger receptor class B member 2
- External IDs: OMIM: 602257; MGI: 1196458; HomoloGene: 48353; GeneCards: SCARB2; OMA:SCARB2 - orthologs

Gene location (Human)
Chr.	Chromosome 4 (human)
Band	4q21.1	Start	76,158,737 bp
Band	4q21.1	End	76,234,536 bp

Gene location (Mouse)
Chr.	Chromosome 5 (mouse)
Band	5|5 E2	Start	92,589,173 bp
Band	5|5 E2	End	92,654,692 bp
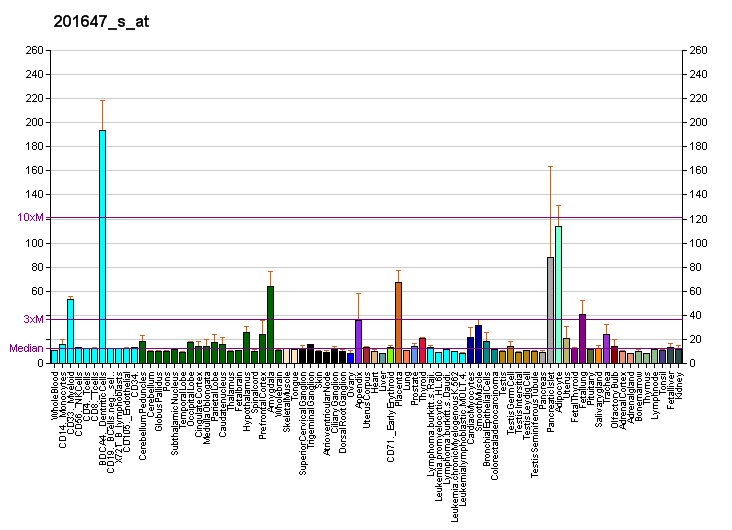

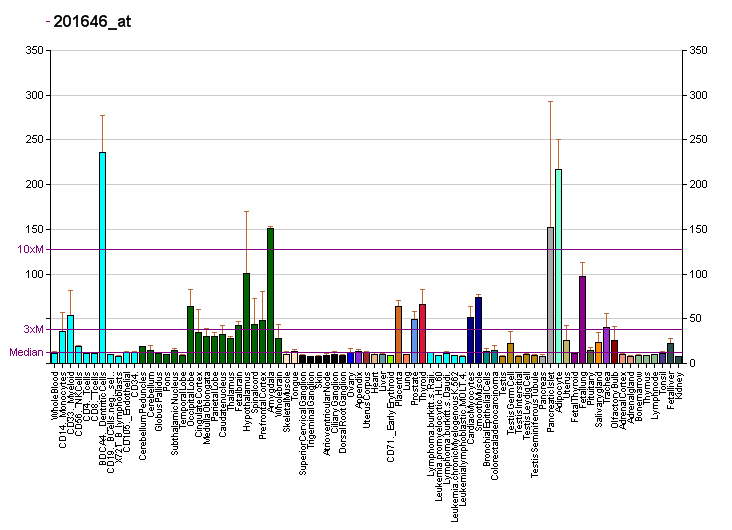
RNA expression pattern
Bgee	Human / Mouse (ortholog); Top expressed in: inferior ganglion of vagus nerve; subthalamic nucleus; germinal epithelium; superior vestibular nucleus; external globus pallidus; pons; pars reticulata; pars compacta; lactiferous duct; trigeminal ganglion / Top expressed in: transitional epithelium of urinary bladder; iris; carotid body; ciliary body; median eminence; right lung; arcuate nucleus; ventral tegmental area; deep cerebellar nuclei; dorsal tegmental nucleus; More reference expression data
BioGPS	More reference expression data
Gene ontology
Molecular function	enzyme binding; protein binding; virus receptor activity; phosphatidylserine binding; transmembrane signaling receptor activity; scavenger receptor activity; phospholipid transporter activity; cholesterol binding; phosphatidylcholine binding; protein homodimerization activity; chaperone binding; cargo receptor activity
Cellular component	integral component of membrane; lysosome; lysosomal lumen; extracellular exosome; membrane; focal adhesion; lysosomal membrane; plasma membrane; clathrin-coated vesicle membrane; late endosome membrane; Golgi membrane; endoplasmic reticulum membrane; endosome membrane; endocytic vesicle membrane
Biological process	viral entry into host cell; protein targeting to lysosome; viral process; positive regulation of neuron projection development; membrane organization; regulation of endosome organization; regulation of glucosylceramidase activity; regulation of lysosome organization; receptor-mediated endocytosis; aminophospholipid transport; regulation of cellular carbohydrate catabolic process
Sources:Amigo / QuickGO
Orthologs
Species	Human	Mouse
Entrez	950	12492
Ensembl	ENSG00000138760	ENSMUSG00000029426
UniProt	Q14108	O35114
RefSeq (mRNA)	NM_005506; NM_001204255	NM_007644
RefSeq (protein)	NP_001191184; NP_005497	NP_031670
Location (UCSC)	Chr 4: 76.16 – 76.23 Mb	Chr 5: 92.59 – 92.65 Mb
PubMed search
- Wikidata
View/Edit Human	View/Edit Mouse

Lysosomal integral membrane protein 2 (LIMP-2) is a protein that in humans is encoded by the SCARB2 gene. LIMP-2 is expressed in brain, heart, liver, lung and kidney, mainly in the membrane of lysosome organelles; however, in cardiac muscle, LIMP-2 is also expressed at intercalated discs. LIMP-2 in a membrane protein in lysosomes that functions to regulate lysosomal/endosomal transport. Mutations in LIMP-2 have been shown to cause Gaucher disease, myoclonic epilepsy, and action myoclonus–renal failure syndrome. Abnormal levels of LIMP-2 have also been found in patients with hypertrophic cardiomyopathy.

== Structure ==
Human LIMP-2 has a theoretical molecular weight of 54.3 kDa and is 478 amino acids in length.

Though LIMP-2 was initially discovered in 1985 by Lewis et al. from rat liver lysosomes, LIMP-2 was cloned in 1992 by two groups, one isolated LIMP-2 from human metastatic pancreatic islet tumor cells, and one from rat liver lysosomal membranes. LIMP-2 was isolated as a protein of approximate molecular weight 85 kDa, synthesized from a precursor oform of approximately 77 kDa. The weight discrepancy between its theoretical (54.3 kDa) and observed (85 kDa) is due to the presence of 10 high mannose-type N-linked oligosaccharide chains in the human form of this protein, compared to 11 in mouse and rat. LIMP-2 has two hydrophobic regions, one near the N-terminus and one near the C-terminus, as well as a short isoleucine/leucine-rich cytoplasmic tail consisting of 20 amino acids that serves as the lysosomal targeting sequence. LIMP-2 has been shown to be expressed in brain, heart, liver, lung and kidney.

== Function ==
The protein encoded by this gene is a type III glycoprotein that is located primarily in limiting membranes of lysosomes and endosomes. Studies of the similar proteins in mice and rat suggested that this protein may participate in membrane transportation and the reorganization of endosomal/lysosomal compartment. In rat hepatic cells, LIMP-2 exhibited a half-life for internalization and lysosomal transport of 32 min and 2.0 h, respectively, which resembled those of well-known lysosomal proteins, lamp-1 and lamp-2, though they have different amino acid sequences in their cytoplasmic tails.

LIMP2 has recently been identified as a novel component of intercalated discs in cardiac muscle. Intercalated discs are composed of gap junctions, adherens junctions and desmosomes, and are critical for the mechanical and electrical coupling of adjacent cardiomyocytes. The discovery of LIMP-2 as a component of this complex came about from a genetic screen of a homozygous, hypertensive transgenic rat model of renin overexpression, in which a population of these rats rapidly develop heart failure and another remains compensated. Out of 143 differentially-regulated genes, LIMP-2 was identified to be significantly upregulated in heart failure-prone rat cardiac muscle biopsies, which also proved true in human heart failure. Further analysis employing a LIMP-2 knockout mouse demonstrated that animals lacking LIMP-2 failed to flight a normal hypertrophic response following angiotensin II treatment, however they developed interstitial fibrosis and dilated cardiomyopathy coordinate with disrupted intercalated disc structure. Biochemical and immunohistochemical analyses discovered that LIMP-2 interacts with N-cadherin at intercalated discs, a function outside of lysosomal membranes. Knockdown of LIMP-2 with RNA interference decreased the binding of N-cadherin to the phosphorylated form of beta-catenin, and LIMP-2 overexpression had the reverse effect.

LIMP-2 plays other roles in other organs. Characteristic tubular proteinuria observed in LIMP-2 knockout mice has been shown to be due to a failure of in lysosomal/endosomal fusion, thus proteins reabsorbed in the proximal tubule of the kidney are not properly proteolyzed, causing the proteinuria. Deficiency of LIMP-2 in mice was also reported to impair cell membrane transport processes and cause pelvic junction obstruction, deafness, and peripheral neuropathy.

== Clinical significance ==
In patients with hypertrophic cardiomyopathy due to aortic stenosis, SCARB2 mRNA is significantly upregulated, suggesting that LIMP-2 may act as a hypertrophic marker.

Mutations in SCARB2 have been shown to cause action myoclonus–renal failure syndrome, a rare syndrome characterized by progressive neurological disease and associated with proteinuria, kidney failure, and focal segmental glomerulosclerosis.

Mutations in SCARB2 have also been shown to cause Gaucher disease and myoclonic epilepsy, as LIMP-2 is critical for the proper sorting and targeting of glucocerebrosidase enzyme (the enzyme deficient in Gaucher disease) to lysosomes.

SCARB2 is a receptor for two viruses that cause hand, foot, and mouth disease in children, Enterovirus 71 and Coxsackievirus A16.

== Interactions ==
LIMP-2 has been shown to interact with:

- N-cadherin.
