= CD1 =

Family of glycoproteins

CD1a molecule

Identifiers
- Symbol: CD1A
- Alt. symbols: CD1
- NCBI gene: 909
- HGNC: 1634
- OMIM: 188370
- RefSeq: NM_001763
- UniProt: P06126

Other data
- Locus: Chr. 1 q22-q23
Search for
- Structures: Swiss-model
- Domains: InterPro

CD1b molecule

Identifiers
- Symbol: CD1B
- Alt. symbols: CD1
- NCBI gene: 910
- HGNC: 1635
- OMIM: 188360
- RefSeq: NM_001764
- UniProt: P29016

Other data
- Locus: Chr. 1 q22-q23
Search for
- Structures: Swiss-model
- Domains: InterPro

CD1c molecule

Identifiers
- Symbol: CD1C
- Alt. symbols: CD1
- NCBI gene: 911
- HGNC: 1636
- OMIM: 188340
- RefSeq: NM_001765
- UniProt: P29017

Other data
- Locus: Chr. 1 q22-q23
Search for
- Structures: Swiss-model
- Domains: InterPro

CD1d molecule

Identifiers
- Symbol: CD1D
- NCBI gene: 912
- HGNC: 1637
- OMIM: 188410
- RefSeq: NM_001766
- UniProt: P15813

Other data
- Locus: Chr. 1 q22-q23
Search for
- Structures: Swiss-model
- Domains: InterPro

CD1e molecule

Identifiers
- Symbol: CD1E
- NCBI gene: 913
- HGNC: 1638
- OMIM: 188411
- RefSeq: NM_030893
- UniProt: P15812

Other data
- Locus: Chr. 1 q22-q23
Search for
- Structures: Swiss-model
- Domains: InterPro

CD1 (cluster of differentiation 1) is a family of glycoproteins expressed on the surface of various human antigen-presenting cells. CD1 glycoproteins are structurally related to the class I MHC molecules, however, in contrast to MHC class 1 proteins, they present lipids, glycolipids and small molecules antigens, from both endogenous and pathogenic proteins, to T cells and activate an immune response.

T cells recognise CD1 using TCR αβ, γδ, or CD36 family members. T cells that are activated by CD1-antigen complexes are called CD1-restricted T cells. 10% of all αβ T lymphocytes in human peripheral blood are Cd1-restricted, out of which, the most abundant are the T cells specific for CD1c.

The human CD1 gene cluster is located on chromosome 1. Genes of the CD1 family were first cloned in 1986, by Franco Calabi and C. Milstein, whereas the first known lipid antigen for CD1 was discovered in 1994, during studies of Mycobacterium tuberculosis. The first antigen that was discovered to be able to bind CD1 and then be recognised by TCR is C80 mycolic acid. Even though their precise function is unknown, The CD1 system of lipid antigen recognition by TCR offers the prospect of discovering new approaches to therapy and developing immunomodulatory agents.

== Types ==
CD1 glycoproteins can be classified primarily into two groups of CD1 isoforms which differ in their lipid anchoring, as well as their expression patterns of the CD1 genes (CD1d is constitutively expressed, whereas the group 1 CD1 genes are inducible and coordinately regulated by myeloid cells).

- CD1a, CD1b and CD1c (group 1 CD1 molecules) are expressed on cells specialized for antigen presentation.
  - CD1e is also considered a group 1 CD1 molecule, even though it does not function in antigen presentation, contrasting the other isoforms.
- CD1d (group 2 CD1) is expressed in a wider variety of cells.

CD1e is an intermediate form, a soluble lipid transfer protein that is expressed intracellularly. It does not present lipid antigens to T cells, rather plays a role in the processing of lipid antigens and loading them onto other CD1 molecules.

== In humans ==
=== Group 1 ===
Group 1 CD1 molecules have been shown to present foreign lipid antigens to CD1-specific T cells. Human CD1 cells can recognise and bind a large number of lipids, from monoacylated lipids or lipopeptides to tetra-acylated lipids. However, not all of the lipid ligands can be considered antigens for T-cells. Free fatty acids sphingolipids, phospholipids, sulfolipids, lysophospholipids, amphipathic small molecules and some oils function as natural antigens for T cells.

=== Group 2 ===
The natural antigens of group 2 CD1 are not well characterized, but a synthetic glycolipid, alpha-galactosylceramide (α-GalCer), originally isolated from a compound found in a marine sponge, has strong biologic activity.

Group 2 CD1 molecules activate a group of T cells, known as natural killer T cells because of their expression of NK surface markers such as CD161. Natural Killer T (NKT) cells are activated by CD1d-presented antigens, and rapidly produce Th1 and Th2 cytokines, typically represented by interferon-gamma and IL-4 production. The group 2 (CD1d) ligand α-GalCer is currently in phase I clinical trials for the treatment of advanced non-hematologic cancers.

NKT cells that respond to α-GalCer are termed "type 1 NKTs". There exists another group of "type 2 NKTs" that do not respond to α-GalCer-CD1D. Instead, they respond to a diverse set of antigens such as sulfatide-CD1d and mycobacterial lipid-CD1d.

=== Diagnostic relevance ===
CD1 antigens are expressed on cortical thymocytes, but not on mature T cells. This often remains true in neoplastic cells from these populations, so that the presence of CD1 antigens can be used in diagnostic immunohistochemistry to identify some thymomas and malignancies arising from T cell precursors. CD1a, in particular, is a specific marker for Langerhans cells, and can therefore also be used in the diagnosis of Langerhans cell histiocytosis. Other conditions that may show CD1 positivity include myeloid leukaemia and some B cell lymphomas.

== Structure ==
CD1 proteins consist of a heavy chain with α1, α2, and α3 domains and a transmembrane domain which anchors it to the cell membrane. Much like the MHC molecules, the CD1 heavy chain associates with β2-microglobulin and its binding groove consists of two antiparallel α-helices, placed atop a β-sheet platform. The antigen-binding cleft architecture of CD1 proteins consists of A', C', F' and T' binding pockets and C' and D'/E' accessory portals, which act to accommodate the aliphatic hydrocarbon chains present in lipid, glycolipid, phospholipid, or lipopeptide antigens. CD1 antigen binding clefts are defined by locations of named portals where antigens protrude.

The main difference in structure between MHC and CD1 proteins is that in MHC proteins, the contact region for TCR show lateral symmetry, whereas human CD1 proteins show left-right asymmetry. Another difference between MHC and CD1 proteins is that the antigen display platform of CD1 molecules is smaller than the antigen display groove of MHC molecules.

=== Cd1-lipid TCR interactions ===
Three models of CD1 recognition by TCR have been described: "head group recognition" model, "absence of interference" model and "altered CD1" model. The "head group recognition" model is considered to be a classical mode of CD1-antigen recognition, whereas the other two models posit that TCR contacts CD1 and not lipid. They are believed to occur in different TCR-antigen-CD1 pairings. The two former models are proven by protein crystallography.

- The "Head group recognition" model, also called "headgroup discrimination" model, is attributed to CD1b and CD1d, and it refers to the fact that TCR do not only react to peptidic antigens, but can also recognise and bind to the structure of carbohydrate and other non-peptidic head groups of antigens that are carried by CD1. It is also called "corecognition" and is most similar to the recognition between TCR and traditional peptide-MHC.
- The "absence of interference" model emerged as a result of the identification of tissue-derived CD1a-presented autoantigens and the first CD1a-lipid-TCR structure, between an autoreactive TCR which bound the CD1a without contacting the lipid that CD1a was carrying. In accordance to the left-right asymmetry of CD1, the small hydrophobic lipid ligand emerges from the F' binding pocket (the right side of the CD1 binding cleft) and TCR binds to the A' binding pocket (the left side of CD1a). Sulfatide and sphingomyelin can be considered antagonists for CD1 autoreactive cells, as they have a large polar head group and can block the CD1a A' binding pocket.
- The "altered CD1" model is attributed to CD1c. CD1c has A' pole, F' roof and G' portal, which serve as points of access to the binding cleft. When it is loaded with fatty acids and lipids, CD1c alters its 3D surface in order to act as a TCR recognition surface.

The TCR3d database includes all examples of a CD1-family protein interacting with an TCR in the Protein Data Bank, updated periodically.

=== CD36 interactions ===
Although it is known that CD1 binds to CD36, there is currently (as of January 2026) no structural characterization of the nature of the interaction.

== In other animals ==
=== Rodents ===
Mice lack the group 1 CD1 molecules, and instead have 2 copies of CD1d. Thus, mice have been used extensively to characterize the role of CD1d and CD1d-dependent NKT cells in a variety of disease models. Rats also lack group 1 CD1 molecules.

Guinea pigs have both groups of CD1 and are commonly used as the alternative model animal for CD1 research. Specifically, they express four orthologs of the group 1 CD1b protein and three orthologs of CD1c, as well as one ortholog of CD1d.

=== Ruminants ===
Cows have one copy each of CD1a and CD1e, several copies of CD1b, and no copies of CD1c. Ruminants including cows were previously thought to have no functional copies of CD1d (only pseudogenes) due to lack of reaction to αGalCer when tested using mouse iNKT cells, but later research has shown CD1d to be expressed and the genes for the NKT machinery to be present. It turns out bovine CD1d has an altered binding pocket causing a different binding "pose". The change also incurs a limit on the length of the glycosphingolipid antigen.

Because cows are a natural host of Mycobacterium bovis, a pathogen in humans as well, it is hoped that studying cows will yield insights into the group 1 CD1 antigen-presenting system. M. bovis is also very similar to M. tuberculosis genetically. Cows are a valuable model organism for studying immune responses to tuberculosis with many similarities to humans. Nevertheless, they have their own special features such as the aforementioned CD1 repertoire and a special division of labor among δγ T cells by expression of WC1, a protein not found in primates.
