= Sulfatide =

Class of compounds

The structural formula of a sulfatide

Sulfatide, also known as 3-O-sulfogalactosylceramide, SM4, or sulfated galactocerebroside, is a class of sulfolipids, specifically a class of sulfoglycolipids, which are glycolipids that contain a sulfate group. Sulfatide is synthesized primarily starting in the endoplasmic reticulum and ending in the Golgi apparatus where ceramide is converted to galactocerebroside and later sulfated to make sulfatide. Of all of the galactolipids that are found in the myelin sheath, one fifth of them are sulfatide. Sulfatide is primarily found on the extracellular leaflet of the myelin plasma membrane produced by the oligodendrocytes in the central nervous system and in the Schwann cells in the peripheral nervous system. However, sulfatide is also present on the extracellular leaflet of the plasma membrane of many cells in eukaryotic organisms.

Since sulfatide is a multifunctional molecule, it can be used in multiple biological areas. Aside from being a membrane component, sulfatide functions in protein trafficking, cell aggregation and adhesion, neural plasticity, memory, and glial-axon interactions. Sulfatide also plays a role in several physiological processes and systems, including the nervous system, the immune system, insulin secretion, blood clotting, viral infection, and bacterial infection. As a result, sulfatide is associated with, able to bind to, and/or is present in kidney tissues, cancer cells/ tissues, the surface of red blood cells and platelets, CD1 a-d cells in the immune system, many bacteria cells, several viruses, myelin, neurons, and astrocytes.

An abnormal metabolism or change in the expression of sulfatide has also been associated with various pathologies, including neuropathologies, such as metachromatic leukodystrophy, Alzheimer's disease, and Parkinson's disease. Sulfatide is also associated with diabetes mellitus, cancer metastasis, and viruses, including HIV-1, Influenza A virus, Hepatitis C and Vaccinia virus. Additionally, overexpression of sulfatide has been linked to epilepsy and audiogenic seizures as well as other pathological states in the nervous system.

Past and ongoing research continues to elucidate the many biological functions of sulfatide and their many implications as well as the pathology that has been associated with sulfatide. Most research utilizes mice models, but heterologous expression systems are utilized as well, including, but not limited to, Madin-Darby canine kidney cells and COS-7 Cells.

== History ==
Sulfatide was the first sulfoglycolipid to be isolated in the human brain. It was named sulfatide in 1884 by Johann Ludwig Wilhelm Thudichum when he published "A Treatist of the Chemical Constitution of the Brain". Originally, in 1933, it was first reported by Blix that sulfatide contained amide bound fatty acid and 4-sphingenine and that the sulfate of sulfatide was thought to be attached to the C6 position of galactose. This was again supported in 1955 by Thannhauser and Schmidt; however, through gas-liquid chromatography, Tamio Yamakawa found that sulfate was actually attached to the C3 position of galactose, not the C6 position. Thus, in 1962, Yamakawa completed the corrected chemical structure of sulfatide.

== Synthesis and degradation ==
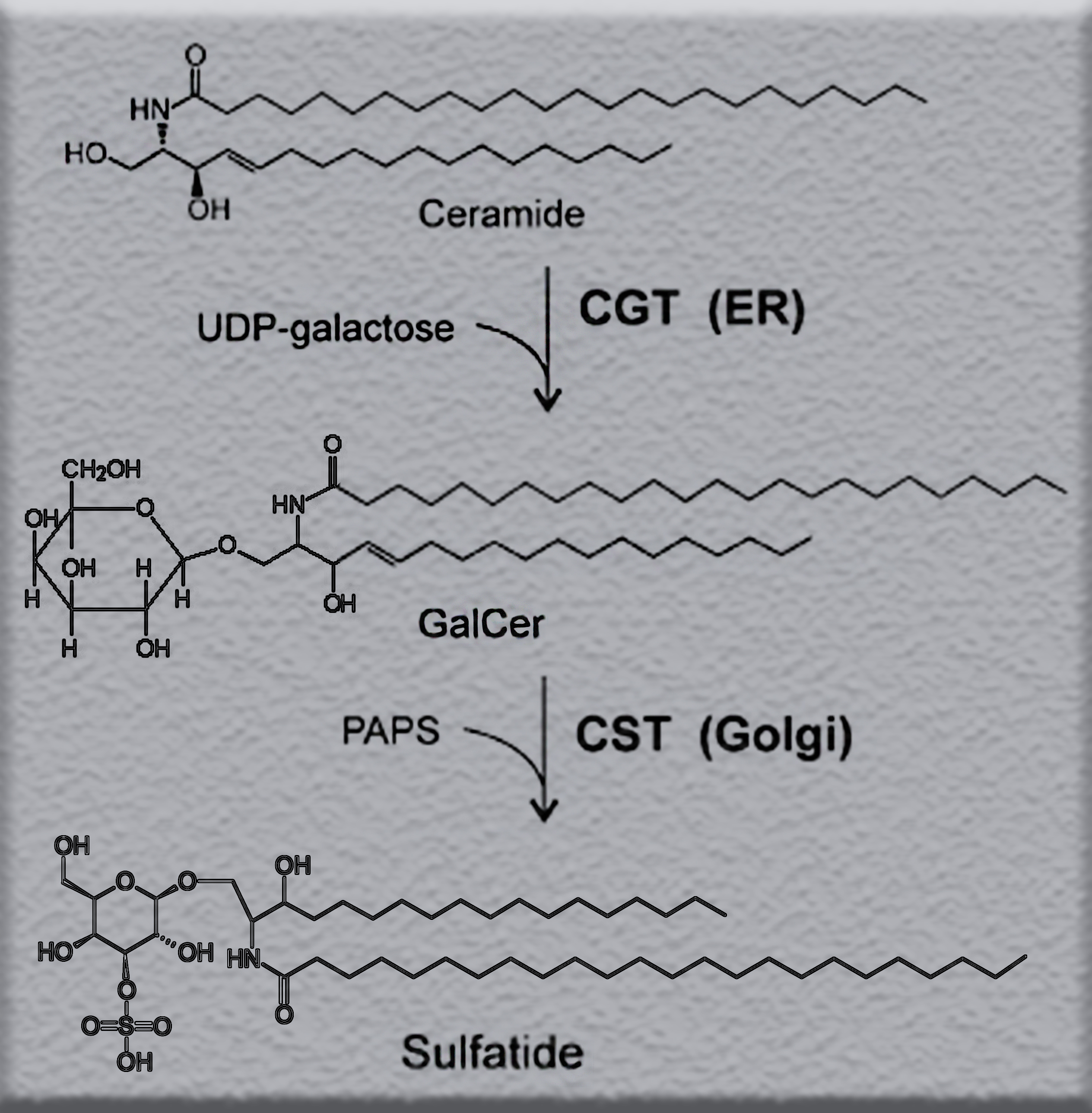
Synthesis of sulfatide

Sulfatide synthesis begins with a reaction between UDP-galactose and 2-hydroxylated or non-hydroxylated ceramide. This reaction is catalyzed by galactosyltransferase (CGT), where galactose is transferred to 2-hydroxylated, or non-hydroxylated ceramide, from UDP-galactose. This reaction occurs in the luminal leaflet of the endoplasmic reticulum, and its final product is GalCer, or galactocerebroside, which is then transported to the Golgi apparatus. Here, GalCer reacts with 3’-phosphoadenosine-5’-phosphosulfate (PAPS) to make sulfatide. This reaction is catalyzed by cerebroside sulfotransferase (CST). CST is a homodimeric protein that is found in the Golgi apparatus. It has been demonstrated that mice models lacking CST, CGT, or both are incapable of producing sulfatide indicating that CST and CGT are necessary components of sulfatide synthesis.

Sulfatide degradation occurs in the lysosomes. Here, arylsulfatase A hydrolyzes the sulfate group. However, in order for this reaction to be carried out, a sphingolipid activator protein such as saposin B must be present. Saposin B extracts sulfatide from the membrane, which makes it accessible to arylsulfatase A. Arylsulfatase A can then hydrolyze the sulfate group. Accumulation of sulfatide can cause metachromatic leukodystrophy, a lysosomal storage disease and may be caused because of a defect in arylsulfatase A, leading to an inability to degrade sulfatide.

== Biological functions of sulfatide ==
Sulfatide participates in many biological systems and functions, including the nervous system, the immune system, and in haemostasis/ thrombosis. Sulfatide has also been shown to play a minor role in the kidneys.

=== Nervous system ===
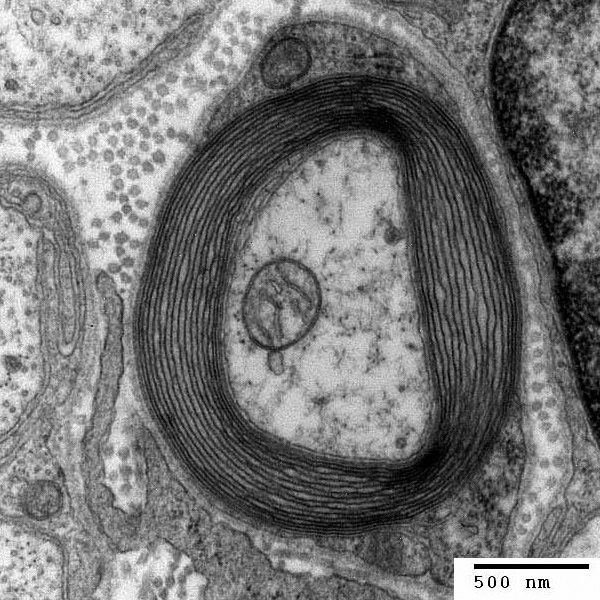
Transmission electron micrograph of a myelinated axon

Sulfatide is a major component in the nervous system and is found in high levels in the myelin sheath in both the peripheral nervous system and the central nervous system. Myelin is typically composed of about 70 -75% lipids, and sulfatide comprises 4-7% of this 70-75%. When lacking sulfatide, myelin sheath is still produced around the axons; however, when lacking sulfatide the lateral loops and part of the nodes of Ranvier are disorganized, so the myelin sheath does not function properly. Thus, lacking sulfatide can lead to muscle weakness, tremors, and ataxia.

Elevated levels of sulfatide are also associated with Metachromatic Leukodystrophy, which leads to the progressive loss of myelin as a result of sulfatide accumulation in the Schwann cells, oligodendrocytes, astrocytes, macrophages and neurons. Elevated levels of sulfatide have also been linked to epilepsy and audiogenic seizures (seizures induced by sound), while elevated levels of anti-sulfatide antibodies in the serum have been associated with multiple sclerosis and Parkinson's.

==== Differentiating myelin sheath ====
As stated above, sulfatide is predominantly found in the oligodendrocytes and the Schwann cells in the nervous system. When oligodendrocytes are differentiating, sulfatide is first evident in immature oligodendrocytes. However, research suggests that sulfatide has a greater role than simply being a structural component of the membrane. This is because sulfatide is upregulated, i.e.there is an increase in sulfatide, prior to the myelin sheath being wrapped around the axon, and experiments in cerebroside sulfotransferase (CST) deficient mice have shown that sulfatide operates as a negative regulator (inhibitor) of oligodendrocyte differentiation. Accordingly, further research has demonstrated that when sulfatide is deficient, there is a two to threefold increase in oligodendrocyte differentiation, evidence providing support that sulfatide operates as a negative regulator or inhibitor of oligodendrocyte differentiation. Myelination also appears to be stimulated by sulfatide in the Schwann Cells. Such stimulation is thought to occur through the following interactions. First, sulfatide binds to tenascin-R or laminin in the extracellular matrix, which goes on to bind signaling molecules such as F3 and integrins in the glial membrane. This causes signaling through c-src/fyn kinase. Specifically, the laminin α6β1-integrin forms a complex with fyn kinase and focal adhesion kinase that enables signaling, which, in turn, causes myelination to begin. Sulfatide binding to laminin also causes c-src/fyn kinase activation and initiation of basement membrane formation.

==== Sulfatide and myelin and lymphocyte protein ====
Sulfatide also associates with myelin and lymphocyte protein (MAL). Research has shown that MAL may be involved in vesicular transport of sulfatide and other myelin proteins and lipids to the myelinating membrane. MAL is also believed to form membrane microdomains (small regions on the membrane with distinct structure and function) in which lipids, such as sulfatide, are stabilized into lipid rafts, allowing stabilization of the glial-axon junctions.

==== Glial-axon junctions and signaling ====
Sulfatide has also been shown to play a role in myelin maintenance and glial-axon signaling, which was indicated by research in older cerebroside sulfotransferase (CST)-deficient mice. These mice had vacuolar degeneration, uncompacted myelin, and moderate demyelination of the spinal cord. This occurs because improper glial-axon signaling and contact and disruption of paranodal glial-axon junctions causes improper placement and maintenance of sodium and potassium channel clusters in the axons at the nodes of Ranvier. As a result, the maintenance of Nav1.6 sodium clusters is impaired as there is a decrease in the number of clusters of sodium channels at the nodes of Ranvier. Additionally, Kv1.2 channels are moved from the paranodal position to the juxtaparanodal position causing impairment of these channels; this is also associated with the loss of neurofascin 155 and Caspr clusters, which are important components of the glial-axon junction.

Sulfatide is also important for glial-axon junctions in the peripheral nervous system. In peripheral nerves that are cerebroside sulfotransferase (CST) deficient, the nodes of Ranvier form enlarged axonal protrusions filled with enlarged vesicles, and neurofascin 155 and Caspr clusters are diminished or absent. In order to form a paranodal junction, Caspr and contactin form a complex with neurofascin 155. It has been shown that sulfatide may be involved in the recruitment and formation of neurofascin 155 in lipid rafts; neurofascin 155 protein clusters then bring Caspr and contactin into the membrane to form the complex, which allows the formation of stable glial-axon junctions. Consequently, sulfatide plays an important role in maintaining the paranodal glial-axon junctions, which allows for proper glial-axon interaction and signaling. Sulfatide has also been shown to be an inhibitor of myelin-associated axon outgrowth, and small amounts of sulfatide have been found in astrocytes and neurons, which is also indicative of its importance in glial-axon junctions.

==== Abnormal sulfatide expression ====
Abnormal expression of sulfatide is linked to several neurological disorders. As stated before, one of the major neurological disorders is Metachromatic Leukodystrophy, which is caused by elevated levels of sulfatide, leading to the progressive loss of myelin as a result of sulfatide accumulation. High levels of sulfatide in the gray matter in the cerebellum and in the superior frontal lobe have been associated with Parkinson's disease. Additionally, accumulation of sulfatide in neurons causes audiogenic seizures, which have been shown to be lethal in mouse models. On the other hand, reduced levels of sulfatide in the cerebral gray and white matter have been associated with Alzheimer's disease.

=== Immune system ===
Different types of cells that present antigens on their surfaces include:

- Macrophages
- Dendritic cells
- Hepatocytes
- B cells
- Tumour cells
- Thymocytes

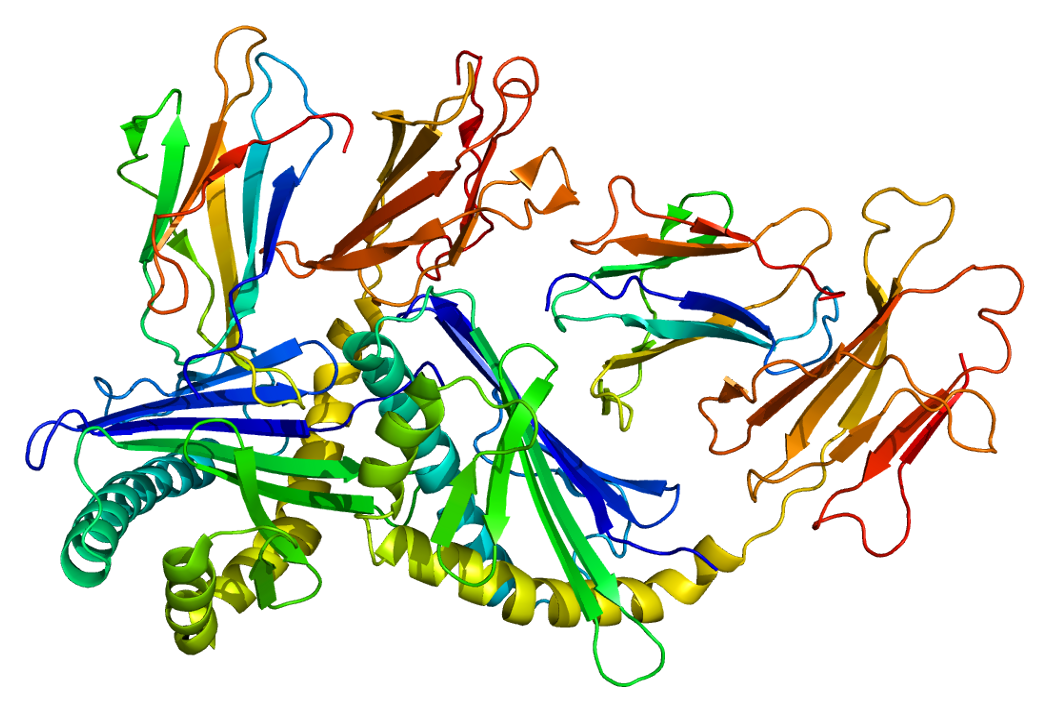
CD1D Protein

Each of these different cell types are expressed in cluster of differentiation 1 molecules (CD1). There are 5 subtypes of CD1 molecules that range from a through e. The a through d subtypes are capable of binding to sulfatide. CD1a, CD1b, and CD1c subtypes present lipid antigens to T cells, while CD1d cells present lipids, glycolipids, and lipoproteins to Natural killer T cells. CD1 a through c cell subtypes initiate T helper type 1 and type 2 responses, and they facilitate sulfatide loading onto the surface of the cells. There are two types of cell subtypes that interact with CD1d cells: Type 1 Natural killer T cells and Type 2 Natural killer T cells. Type 2 Natural killer T cells are able to recognize sulfatide/ CD1d tetramers, and as a result, they are activated by different tissues specific forms of sulfatide. Type 2 Natural killer T cells that react with sulfatide help aid in protection from autoimmune disease and ischemic reperfusion. They are capable of such protection because the Type 1 Natural killer T cells can be regulated by Type 2 Natural killer T cells that react with sulfatide by altering how the dendritic cells function.

Sulfatide also acts as an L-selectin and P-selectin ligand, but it does not act as an E- selectin ligand. Selectins are adhesion molecules that facilitate the capture of circulating leukocytes. Sulfatide is also expressed on the surface of many types of cancer cells and tissues. Accordingly, sulfatide may function as a ligand for P-selectin, which facilitates cancer metastasis. Additionally, when L-selectin and sulfatide bind, upregulation of the chemokine co-receptor's (CXCR4) expression is observed, specifically on the surfaced of leukocytes.

Sulfatide may also function as a receptor for chemokines, which are small chemostatic cytokines, and they provide directional signals for leukocyte movement. Chemokines are implicated in:

- Angiogenesis
- HIV-1 infection
- Tumour metastasis
- Haematopoiesis
- Graft rejection
- Embryonic development

Sulfatide is also capable of binding to scavenger proteins found on macrophages. Such binding facilitates a macrophage's ability to take up apoptotic cells.

Autoimmunity also affects sulfatide levels. When an enhanced antibody response against myelin lipids occurs, including sulfatide in patients with multiple sclerosis, the demyelination process is increased significantly. When sulfatide and gangliosides are present, the proliferation or production of Natural Killer-T cells that produce cytokines are activated. However, when CD1d deficient-mice are tested for their response to sulfatide, the same response is not seen, which indicates that in myelin, sulfatide is a glycolipid that possesses immunodominance.

Locally, the disruption of myelin due to the infiltration of T cells and macrophages, results in the phagocytosis of myelin by microglia or macrophages, suggesting that the T cells are presented with myelin lipids by CD1 molecules at sites of inflammation.

=== Hemostasis/thrombosis ===
Sulfatide has roles in both blood coagulation and anticoagulation. Sulfatide has anticoagulation activity when it binds to fibrinogen, which prevents fibrinogen from converting to fibrin. Sulfatide also has a direct inhibitory effect on thrombosis. On the other hand, sulfatide also helps to improve blood coagulation and thrombosis: first, sulfatide is believed to aid in thrombosis through its participation with coagulation factor XII; second, sulfatide binding to annexin V accelerates coagulation; third, sulfatide and P-selectin interactions expressed on platelets, help to ensure stable platelet adhesion and aggregation. However, most of these conclusions have been drawn using exogenous forms of sulfatide. Consequently, additional research and experimentation on endogenous sulfatide is necessary to fully understand the role of sulfatide in coagulation and thrombosis. Sulfatide is also present in serum lipoproteins, which are believed to be associated with the cause and development of cardiovascular disease.

=== Kidney ===
Sulfatide can also be found in the kidney. Although sulfatide is not necessary for the kidneys to maintain their function and structure, it does play an active role in different aspects of the kidney. For example, sulfatide is a ligand for L-selectin, which is a receptor that can be found in the kidneys. Specifically, L-selectin is a lymphoid receptor, and the binding between L-selectin and sulfatide in the kidney's interstitium plays a major role in monocyte permeation and infiltration into the kidney. Additionally, sulfatide is also found in the glandular stomach epithelium and in the apical membranes of the distal kidney tubuli where Myelin and lymphocyte protein (MAL) is expressed. MAL forms complexes with sulfatide and other glycosphingolipids, and these complexes have been shown to play a role in apical sorting and stabilization of sphingoglycolipid enriched areas.

== Role in pathological cells and tissue ==
Sulfatide has been shown to play a role or have some association with several diseases and infections. This includes diabetes mellitus, cancer and tumors, metachromatic leukodystrophy, various bacterial infections, and viruses, including HIV-1, Hepatitis C, Influenza A virus, and Vaccinia virus.

=== Metachromatic leukodystrophy ===
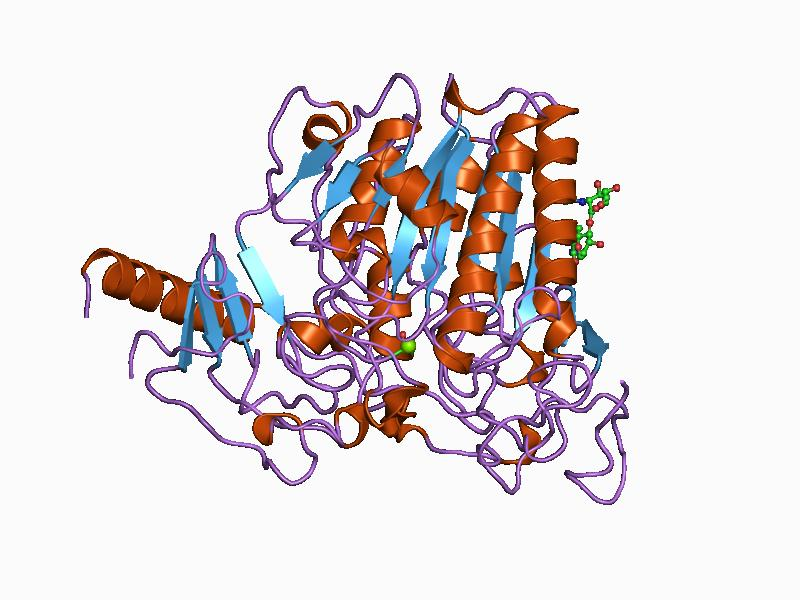
arylsulfatase A

Metachromatic leukodystrophy, also known as MLD, is a recessive lysosomal storage disorder. It is believed to be caused by a deficiency in arylsulfatase A. Arylsulfatase A is a lysosomal sulfatase that is able to hydrolyze the 3-O-sulfogalactosylceramide and 3-O-sulfolactosylceramide. Both 3-O-sulfolactosylceramide and 3-O-sulfogalactosylceramide can be located mainly in the central nervous system as well as in the peripheral nervous system. When lacking the lysosomal enzyme or mutations in the gene coding for saposin B occur, this can lead to the accumulation of lysosomal sulfatide, which then develops into metachromatic leukodystrophy.

Sulfatide plays an important role in the myelin. Myelin acts as an insulating sheath that surrounds many nerve fibers and increases the speed at which impulses are conducted. When sulfatide is not distributed properly, it can affect the normal physiological conduction of electrical impulses between nerve cells. This then results in demyelination because of the buildup of sulfatide and is the main cause of Metachromatic Leukodystrophy.

However, how sulfatide buildup causes demyelination and neural degeneration is still mostly unknown. Metachromatic Leukodystrophy results in neurological manifestations that are centered on the impairment of the central nervous system and the peripheral nervous system, including the following: seizures, progressive coordination and speech problems, and behavioral disturbances. Treatment is still being studied and evaluated, but mice studies indicate that treatments, including gene therapy, cell-based therapies using oligodendrocyte progenitors cells, enzyme replacement therapy, or adeno-associated viral and lentiviral mediated gene therapy may prove to be effective in reducing the effects of Metachromatic Leukodystrophy.

=== Diabetes mellitus ===
Sulfatide has several isoforms, including C16:0, which is found primarily in the secretory granules and toward the surface of the membrane of β cells. Secretory granules and β cells are found in the islet of Langerhans and in rat β TC3 cells. Research has shown that in the pancreases of Type II diabetic mouse models, there is a deficiency of C16:0. Additional research has shown that C16:0 plays an important role in assisting to improve insulin crystal preservation, and as the β cells in the pancreas secrete insulin, sulfatide aids in the monomerization of insulin, which is the breakdown of insulin into its basics components or monomers. Consequently, sulfatide is needed in order to maintain normal insulin secretion, which sulfatide is capable of mediating through stimulation of calcium dependent exocytosis and adenosine triphosphate (ATP)-sensitive potassium ion channels. Sulfatide can also stimulate proinsulin folding as well, as it can serve as a molecular chaperone for insulin.

In the diagnosis of Type I diabetes, elevated anti-sulfatide antibodies in serum arise. Such anti-sulfatide antibodies prevent insulin secretion and exocytosis. However, research has shown that when non-obese diabetic mice are treated with sulfatide, it reduces the possible occurrence of diabetes from 85% in control animals to 35% in experimental animals. Sulfatide is also commonly known to possess anti-inflammatory properties. As a result of these anti-inflammatory properties, which aid in the blockage of L-selectin, sulfatide has been shown to prevent type I diabetes and inhibit insulitis in non-obese diabetic mice. Sulfatide also prevents apoptosis in insulin secreting cells by preventing the effects of interleukin-1 beta (lL-1β), interferon beta 1b (lFN-1β), and tumor necrosis factor alpha (TNF-α) that promote apoptosis.

Sulfatide may also be involved in not just type I diabetes, but also type II diabetes. Specifically, sulfatide is capable of inhibiting TNF-α secretion. When there are low serum levels of sulfatide, as well as elevated production of TNF-α in patients that have type II diabetes, it is commonly associated with insulin resistance. However, sulfatide may mediate suppression of type II diabetes through the activation of potassium protein channels.

=== Cancer and tumor ===
Elevated sulfatide is common in many tissues in the human body, including numerous cancer tissues and cells. These include:

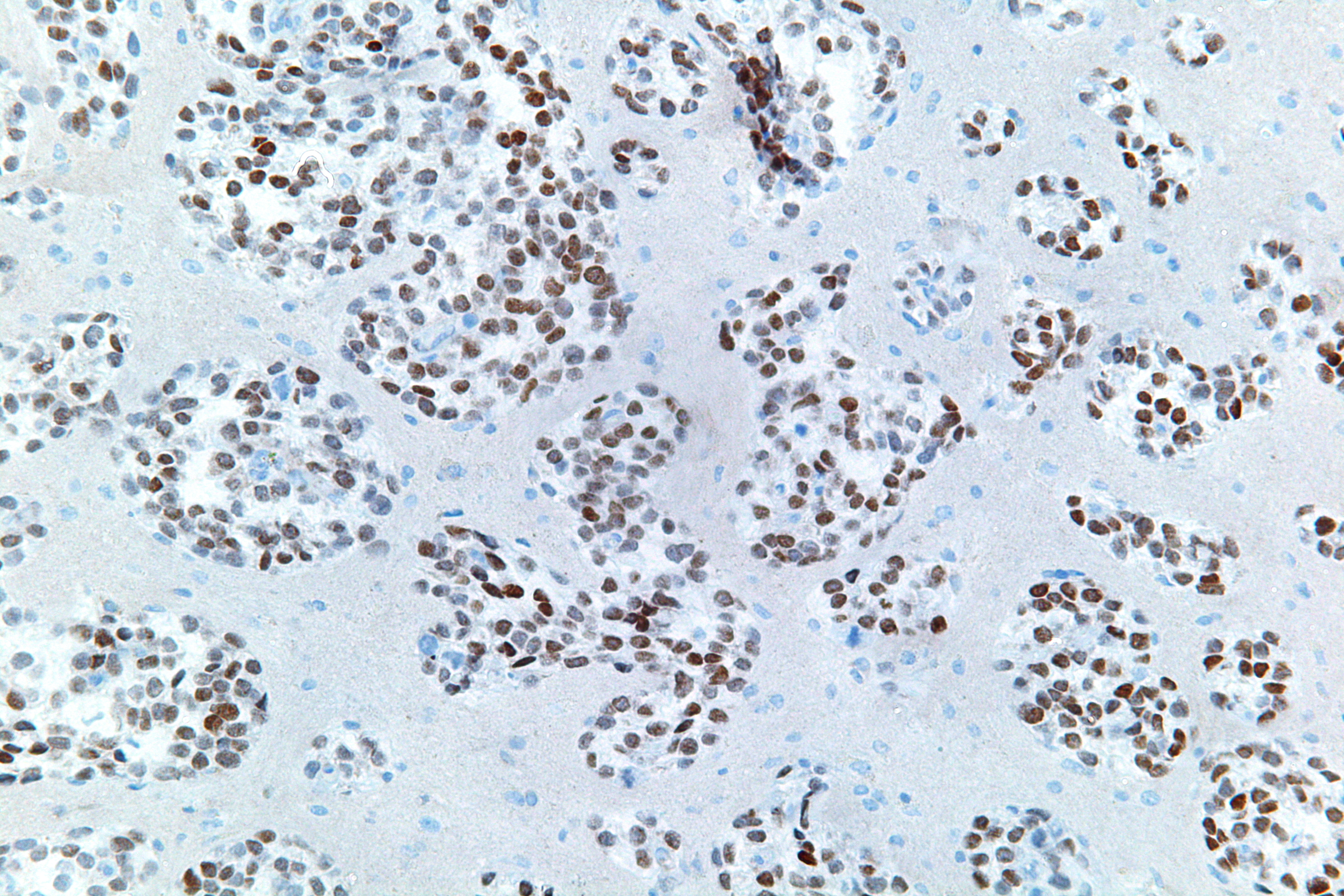
Primary Lung adenocarcinoma

- Primary colorectal cancer tissues
- Primary lung adenocarcinoma tissues
- Malignant and benign ovarian cancer tissues
- Renal carcinoma tissues
- Serous papillary ovarian carcinoma tissues
- Gastric cancer tissues
- Renal carcinoma (SMKT-R3 cell line)

Sulfatide levels in these cancer lines and tissues may vary. For example, the levels of sulfatide are much lower in undifferentiated small cell carcinoma tissues and primary lung squamous cell carcinoma tissues in humans than in primary lung adenocarcinoma tissue in humans. In human ovarian cancers, sulfatide levels are much higher in malignant ovarian cancers than in benign ovarian cancers. Other cancers such as Wilms' tumor show no expression of sulfatide. Therefore, it appears that such increased levels of sulfatide are not universal in every form of cancer, and more experimentation must be done to confirm that elevated levels of sulfatide are not just artifacts of cultured cancer cell lines.

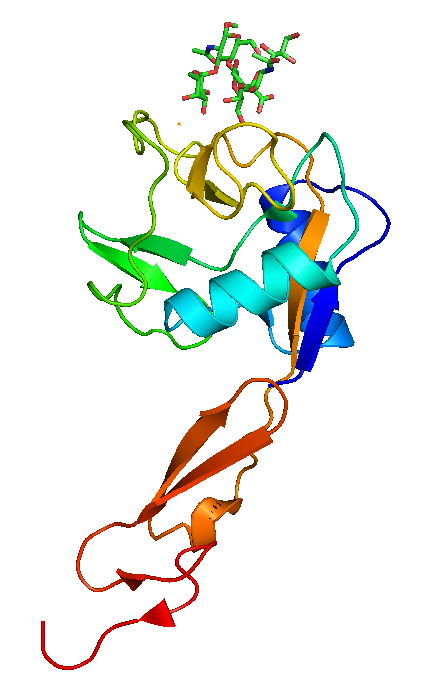
P-selectin

However, experimentation using renal cancer cell lines has given some insight into the mechanism for the elevated levels of sulfatide expression in cancer cells. Specifically, cerebroside sulfotransferase (CST) is elevated as it passes along a signaling pathway which involves:

- Hepatocyte growth factor
- Epidermal growth factor
- Tyrosine kinases
- TNF-α
- Protein kinase C
- Ras

This path results in the accumulation of sulfatide in renal cancer cell lines. Additionally, sulfatide can accumulate on the surface of cancer cells. This indicates that sulfatide may serve as a specific ligand for P-selectin. This would contribute to increased metastasis of the cancer. However, more research is needed to elucidate the relationship between the elevated levels of sulfatide expression and the initiation and metastasis mechanisms of cancer, but sulfatide may be a useful serum biomarker for early tumor detection.

=== Viral infection ===
Experimentation with sulfatide has shown that it has involvement in several viral infections, including HIV-1, Influenza A virus, Hepatitis C, and the Vaccinia virus.

==== HIV-1 ====
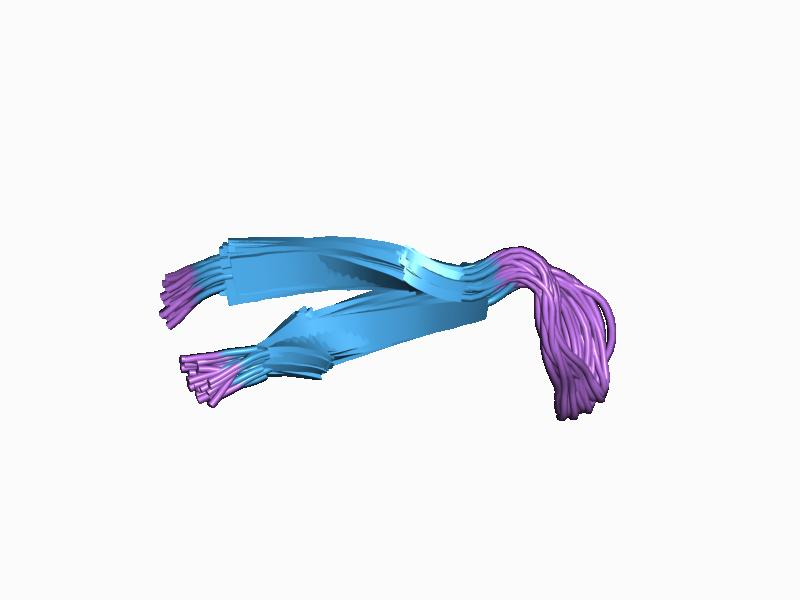
V3 loop fragment of the HIV-1 envelope gp120 complex

Sulfatide shows involvement in HIV-1 infection. gp120-gp41 are specific types of envelope glycoprotein complexes that are found on HIV-1. These glycoprotein complexes can interact with CD4, a viral receptor molecule, which induces a change in the conformation of gp120. This change in conformation allows the gp120 complex to interact with the chemokine co-receptor and the insertion of the fusion peptide, gp41, into the membrane of the host cell. This allows the HIV-1 virus to enter into the cell. Gp120 can also bind to glycolipids like sulfatide and galactocerebroside (GalCer). Sulfatide binds strongly to the V3 loop of gp120, which does not interact with CD4. Consequently, sulfatide acts as an alternate virus receptor in CD4- cells, and it participates in transmembrane signaling. However, sulfatide has little function in HIV-1 infection of CD4+ cells.

The binding of gp120 to GalCer has the ability to start the fusion of HIV-1, but the binding of gp120 to sulfatide does not. Sulfatide is not a functional receptor. However, experiments have shown that sulfatide and GalCer compete for the ability to bind to gp120, and sulfatide has been shown to have the strongest binding affinity for recombinant gp120 of all the glycolipids tested. Therefore, this suggests that when sulfatide is attached to HIV-1, it cannot interact with the chemokine co-receptor because of the instability of the complex between gp120 and sulfatide, which therefore prevents the initiation of the fusion process. This indicates that sulfatide can prevent HIV-1 infection by mediating gp120 binding, which, in turn, prevents the fusion process; consequently, it has been demonstrated that sulfatide treatments may lead to the inhibition of HIV-1 replication.

Additionally, HIV-1-infected patients often suffer from myelin degeneration in the central nervous system. These patients have elevated levels of sulfatide in the cerebrospinal fluid (CSF) and anti-sulfatide antibodies in the serum. Elevated levels of anti-sulfatide antibodies can cause demyelination. This is caused by the binding of the anti-sulfatide antibodies to the surface of the myelin sheath and/or the surface of Schwann Cells, which then activates a complete cascade of demyelination. Also, advanced stage AIDS patients can develop Guillain–Barré syndrome (GBS). Guillain–Barré syndrome is classified as an acute autoimmune polyneuropathy, which specifically affects the peripheral nervous system of the infected patient. Experimentation has shown that anti-sulfatide autoimmune antibodies may contribute to the development of Guillain–Barré syndrome in AIDS patients as well as the development of peripheral nervous system injury in HIV-1 infected patients.

==== Hepatitis C ====
Several patients with Hepatitis C virus (HCV) associated with mixed cryoglobulinemia (MC) have elevated levels of anti-sulfatide antibodies in their blood plasma. Mixed cryoglobulinemia (MC) is an immune disease, which typically presents with immune complex mediated vasculitis of the small vessels. It is believed there is a relationship between HCV and MC; however, the exact role of HCV in relation to the cause of MC has not yet been fully understood or discovered. Nevertheless, sphingolipid synthesis in the host, has been demonstrated to be necessary for HCV replication, which indicates that sulfatide may be involved in the replication of HCV.

==== Influenza A ====
Influenza A virus (IAV) binds strongly to sulfatide. However, sulfatide receptors have no sialic acid, which has been shown to play a necessary role as a virus receptor that facilitates the binding of the influenza A virus. Sulfatide has also been shown to inhibit influenza A virus sialidase activity. However, this is only under acidic conditions not neutral conditions. To fully understand the role of sulfatide in the cycle of IAV infection, research have expressed sulfatide in Madin-Darby canine kidney cells, which can express sulfatide and support IAV replication and in COS-7 cells, which do not have the ability to express sulfatide and do not support IAV replication sufficiently. Consequently, the COS-7 cells were transfected with galactosyltransferase and cerebroside sulfotransferase genes from the Madin-Darby canine kidney cells and used to make two cell clones with the ability to express sulfatide .

These cells were then infected with the IAV virus, and research has shown that the sulfatide enhanced cells infected with IAV show increased IAV replication in the progeny virus, 500–3,000 times the parent virus. However, the sulfatide enriched cells also have a small reduction in initial infection compared to the parent cells. The opposite is shown in sulfatide knockdown Madin-Darby canine kidney cells, exhibiting a reduction in progeny virus concentration vs. parent virus concentration and an increase in initial infection. Overall, such experiments demonstrate that sulfide rich cells enhance IAV replication and that sulfatide on the cell's surface may play a role in the replication of IAV.

Further experimentation has demonstrated that sulfatide enriched cells, in which sulfatide binds to hemagglutinin, enhances IAV replication by increasing the progeny virus particle formation; this is done through the promotion of nuclear export of IAV formed viral ribonucleoproteins from the nucleus to the cytoplasm. Experimentation has also demonstrated that if binding is inhibited between sulfatide and hemagglutinin that viral particle formation and replication would be inhibited, again suggesting that the binding between sulfatide and hemagglutinin facilitates IAV replication.

==== Vaccinia virus ====
Vaccinia virus is closely related to variola virus, which is known to cause the smallpox disease. The vaccinia virus has been shown to be able to bind to sulfatide through the L5 and A27 membrane proteins on the virus. It has been demonstrated in mouse models that sulfatide prevents the attachment of vaccinia virus to the cell's surface, while also preventing death in mouse models that are typically lethal. This suggests that sulfatide may be one decoy receptor for the vaccinia virus.

=== Bacterial infection ===
Sulfatide binds to many bacteria, including:

- Enterotoxigenic Escherichia coli TOP10 strain
- Campylobacter jejuni
- Mycoplasma hyopneumoniae
- Haemophilus influenzae
- Actinobacillus pleuropneumoniae
- Helicobacter pylori
- Moraxella catarrhalis
- Bordetella pertussis
- 987P-fimbriated enterotoxigenic Escherichia coli
- Lactobacillus reuteri (JCM1081 and TM105 strains)
- Mycoplasma hominis
- Mycoplasma pneumoniae
- Pseudomonas aeruginosa
- Haemophilus ducreyi

Sulfatide acts as a glycolipid receptor that functions to aid in the adherence of these bacteria to the mucosal surface. Mycoplasma hyopneumoniae and Actinobacillus pleuropneumoniae are pathogens that cause respiratory disease in swine. Haemophilus influenzae, Bordetella pertussis, Mycoplasma pneumoniae, Moraxella catarrhalis, and Pseudomonas aeruginosa cause respiratory disease in humans. Accordingly, sulfatide is located in the tracheas of both human and swine, and through the use of sulfatide present in the trachea, these several bacteria are capable of adherence to the respiratory tract. Hsp-70 on the outside of Haemophilus influenzae, has also been shown to aid in the ability of this bacteria to bind to sulfatide.

Helicobacter pylori, enterotoxigenic E. coli TOP10 strain, 987P-fimbriated enterotoxigenic E. coli (a strain of E. coli), and Lactobacillus reuteri are different strains of bacteria that are found to adhere to the gastrointestinal tract's mucosal surface. Here, sulfatide is present within the tract and is loaded from outside the tract, aiding the bacteria in adherence to the mucosa.

STb is an enterotoxin type B that is heat stable; additionally, it is secreted by the enterotoxigenic E. coli strain, and it causes diarrhoeal diseases in humans and many other species of animals. STb also binds strongly to sulfatide as demonstrated by its binding to sulfatide present on the mucosal surface of a pig's jejunum. Additional experimentation suggests that sulfatide is a functional STb receptor.

Sulfatide may also play a role in Mycobacterium tuberculosis, which is the agent that causes tuberculosis in humans. Experimentation suggests that sulfatide may be involved in Mycobacterium tuberculosis infection, and it may be an element of the cell wall of the bacterium Mycobacterium tuberculosis.

== Clinical significance ==
=== Role in Alzheimer's disease ===
In Alzheimer's disease, sulfatide in the brain tissue decreases tremendously, starting in the early stages of the disease. In the mild stages of Alzheimer's disease, the loss of sulfatide can be up to 50% in the white matter and up to 90% in the gray matter in the brain. Sulfatide concentration in the cerebral spinal fluid is also lower in subjects with Alzheimer's disease. The characteristic loss of neuronal function associated with Alzheimer's disease occurs via the loss of neurons and synapses, and the deficit is lipid class specific to sulfatides. When comparing sulfatide depletion to other neurodegenerative diseases, Alzheimer's disease is the only case in which sulfatide is so dramatically depleted; in dementia no marked sulfatide depletion is observed, while in Parkinson's disease, sulfatide levels are dramatically elevated, and multiple sclerosis patients only have a moderate sulfatide depletion. Additionally, the loss of sulfatide has been observed to only occur at the very beginning of the disease while at more severe stages, minimal additional sulfatide loss occurs.

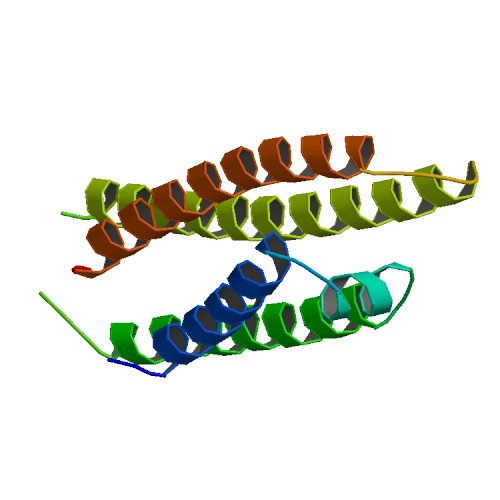
apolipoprotein E

Sulfatides in brain tissue has been studied by looking at apolipoprotein E (apoE), specifically the ε4 allele. The ε4 allele of apolipoprotein E is the only known genetic risk factor to significantly indicate late onset Alzheimer's disease. Possessing the apoE ε4 allele has been associated with a higher risk of developing Alzheimer's disease. ApoE is a protein that is involved in the transport of many lipids, including cholesterol, and thus, regulates how much sulfatide is in the central nervous system and mediates the homeostasis of the system. It has been found that higher levels of apoE are positively correlated with greater sulfatide depletion. ApoE-associated proteins take sulfatide from the myelin sheath and then degrade sulfatide into various compounds, such as sulfate. When apoE is increased, the amount of sulfatide that is taken from the myelin sheath is also increased; hence, there is more sulfatide depletion.

Sulfatide is also involved in the clearance of amyloid-β peptide. Amyloid-β peptides are one of the hallmarks of Alzheimer's disease. When they are not degraded properly, these peptides accumulate and create plaques, which are clumps of amyloid-β peptide pieces, and they are highly associated with Alzheimer's disease. Amyloid-β peptide clearance is important so that this accumulation does not occur. Sulfatide facilitates amyloid-β peptide removal through an endocytotic pathway, so when there are high levels of sulfatide, there are lower amounts of amyloid-β peptides. Since subjects with Alzheimer's disease have lower sulfatide levels, the clearance of amyloid-β peptides is lower, which allows the peptides to accumulate and create plaques in the brain.

=== Relationship to vitamin K ===
Vitamin K has been found to be associated with sulfatide. Not only in animals, but also in bacteria, vitamin K has been observed to influence sulfatide concentrations in the brain. Vitamin K in the nervous system is responsible for the activation of enzymes that are essential for the biosynthesis of brain phospholipids, such as sulfatide. When warfarin, a vitamin K antagonist, is added to an animal model system, sulfatide synthesis is impaired. However, when vitamin K is added back into the system, sulfatide synthesis proceeds normally, suggesting that Vitamin K is necessary for sulfatide synthesis.
