= Sulfoglycolysis =

Catabolic process in wide variety of organisms

Sulfoglycolysis is a catabolic process in primary metabolism in which sulfoquinovose (6-deoxy-6-sulfonato-glucose) is metabolized to produce energy and carbon-building blocks. Sulfoglycolysis pathways occur in a wide variety of organisms, and enable key steps in the degradation of sulfoquinovosyl diacylglycerol (SQDG), a sulfolipid found in plants and cyanobacteria into sulfite and sulfate. Sulfoglycolysis converts sulfoquinovose (C_{6}H_{12}O_{8}S^{−}) into various smaller metabolizable carbon fragments such as pyruvate and dihydroxyacetone phosphate that enter central metabolism. The free energy is used to form the high-energy molecules ATP (adenosine triphosphate) and NADH (reduced nicotinamide adenine dinucleotide). Unlike glycolysis, which allows metabolism of all carbons in glucose, sulfoglycolysis pathways convert only a fraction of the carbon content of sulfoquinovose into smaller metabolizable fragments; the remainder is excreted as C_{3}-sulfonates 2,3-dihydroxypropanesulfonate (DHPS) or sulfolactate (SL); or C_{2}-sulfonates isethionate or sulfoacetate.

Several sulfoglycolytic pathways are known:

- The sulfoglycolytic Embden-Meyerhof-Parnas (sulfo-EMP) pathway, first identified in Escherichia coli, involves the degradation of sulfoquinovose to 2,3-dihydroxypropanesulfonate (DHPS), and shares similarity with the Embden-Meyerhof-Parnas glycolysis pathway. This pathway leads to the production of the C3 intermediate dihydroxyacetone phosphate.
- The sulfoglycolytic Entner-Doudoroff (sulfo-ED) pathway, first identified in Pseudomonas putida SQ1, involves the degradation of sulfoquinovose to sulfolactate, and shares similarity to the Entner-Doudoroff pathway of glycolysis. This pathway leads to the production of the C3 intermediate pyruvate.
- The sulfofructose transaldolase pathway, first identified in Bacillus aryabhattai and Bacillus megaterium, involves isomerization of SQ to sulfofructose, and then a transaldolase cleaves SF to 3-sulfolactaldehyde (SLA), while the non-sulfonated C3-(glycerone)-moiety is transferred to an acceptor molecule, glyceraldehyde phosphate (GAP), yielding fructose-6-phosphate (F6P). The SLA released can either be oxidized (to sulfolactate) or reduced (to dihydroxypropanesulfonate) and then excreted.
- The sulfoglycolytic transketolase (sulfo-TL) pathway was first identified in Clostridium sp. MSTE9. It involves isomerization of SQ to sulfofructose, and then a transketolase cleaves SF to 4-sulfoerythrose (SE), while the C2-moiety is transferred to an acceptor molecule, glyceraldehyde phosphate (GAP), yielding xylulose-5-phosphate (Xu5P). 4-Sulfoerythrose is isomerized to 4-sulfoerythrulose (SEu), whereupon a second round of transketolase catalyzed reaction cleaves SE to sulfoacetaldehyde, while the non-sulfonated C2-moiety is transferred to an acceptor molecule, glyceraldehyde phosphate (GAP), yielding a second molecule of xylulose-5-phosphate (Xu5P). Finally, the sulfoacetaldehyde is reduced to isethionate and excreted.

Additionally, there are sulfoquinovose 'sulfolytic' pathways that allow degradation of sulfoquinovose through cleavage of the C-S bond. These include:

- The sulfoglycolytic sulfoquinovose monooxygenase (sulfo-SMO) pathway, first identified in Agrobacterium tumerfaciens and Novosphingobium aromaticivorans, involves the degradation of sulfoquinovose to glucose and sulfite. Glucose formed in this pathway enters glycolysis.
- The sulfoglycolytic sulfoquinovose dioxygenase (sulfo-SMO) pathway.

In all pathways, energy is formed by breakdown of the carbon-rich fragments in later stages through the 'pay-off' phase of glycolysis through substrate-level phosphorylation to produce ATP and NADH.

== Growth of bacteria on sulfoquinovose and its glycosides ==
A range of bacteria can grow on sulfoquinovose or its glycosides as sole carbon source. E. coli can grow on sulfoquinovose, methyl α-sulfoquinovoside and α-sulfoquinovosyl glycerol. Growth on sulfoquinovosyl glycerol is both faster and leads to higher cell density than for growth on sulfoquinovose. Pseudomonas aeruginosa strain SQ1, Klebsiella sp. strain ABR11, Klebsiella oxytoca TauN1, Agrobacterium sp. strain ABR2, and Bacillus aryabhattai can grow on sulfoquinovose as sole carbon source. A strain of Flavobacterium was identified that could grow on methyl α-sulfoquinovoside.

== Production of sulfoquinovose and its mutarotation ==
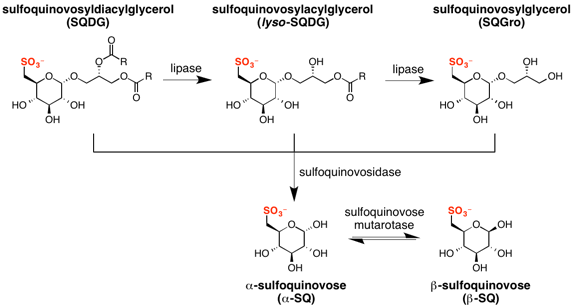
Formation of sulfoquinovose from sulfoquinovosyl diacylglycerol (SQDG).

Sulfoquinovose is rarely found in its free form in nature; rather it occurs predominantly as a glycoside, SQDG. SQDG can be deacylated to form lyso-SQDG and sulfoquinovosylglycerol (SQGro). Sulfoquinovose is obtained from SQ glycosides by the action of sulfoquinovosidases, which are glycoside hydrolases that can hydrolyse the glycosidic linkage in SQDG, or its deacylated form, sulfoquinovosyl glycerol (SQGro).

There are two main classes of sulfoquinovosidases. The first are classical glycoside hydrolases (which belong to CAZy family GH31), and is exemplified by the sulfoquinovosidase YihQ from Escherichia coli. Family GH31 sulfoquinovosidases cleave SQ glycosides with retention of configuration, initially forming α-sulfoquinovose. YihQ sulfoquinovosidase exhibits a preference for the naturally occurring 2'R-SQGro. The second class of sulfoquinovosidases are NAD^{+}-dependent enzymes (which belong to CAZy family GH188) that use an oxidoreductive mechanism to cleave both α- and β-glycosides of sulfoquinovose.

Sulfoglycolysis encoding operons often contain gene sequences encoding aldose-1-epimerases that act as sulfoquinovose mutarotases, catalyzing the interconversion of the α and β anomers of sulfoquinovose.

== Sulfo-EMP pathway ==
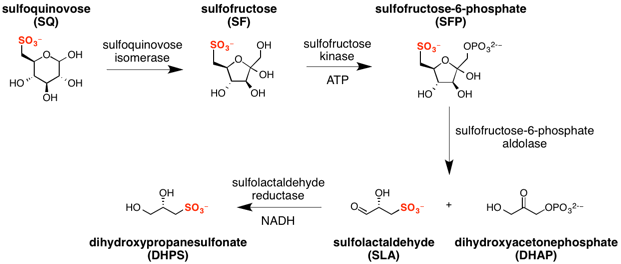
The sulfoglycolytic Embden-Meyerhof-Parnas pathway.

The major steps in the sulfo-EMP pathway are:

- isomerization of sulfoquinovose to sulfofructose (catalyzed by sulfoquinovose isomerase), with transient formation of sulforhamnose;
- phosphorylation of sulfofructose to sulfofructose-1-phosphate (catalyzed by sulfofructose kinase and using ATP as a co-factor);
- retro-aldol cleavage of sulfofructose-1-phosphate to afford dihydroxyacetone phosphate and (S)-sulfolactaldehyde (catalyzed by sulfofructose-1-phosphate aldolase);
- reduction of sulfolactaldehyde to (S)-2,3-dihydroxypropane-1-sulfonate (catalyzed by sulfolactaldehyde reductase and using NADH as a co-factor).

Expression of proteins within the sulfo-EMP operon of E. coli is regulated by a transcription factor termed CsqR (formerly YihW). CsqR binds to DNA sites within the operon encoding the sulfo-EMP pathway, functioning as a repressor. SQ, SQGro and the transiently formed intermediate sulforhamnose (but not lactose, glucose or galactose) function as derepressors of CsqR.

== Sulfo-ED pathway ==
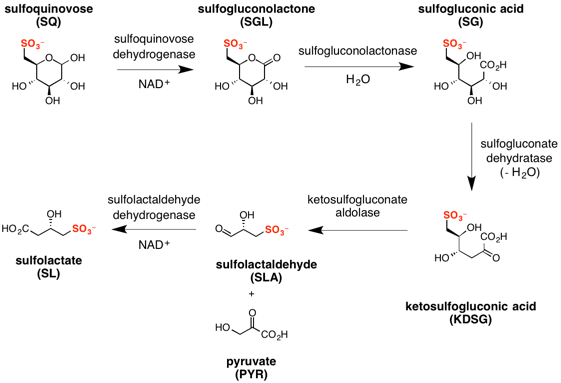
The sulfoglycolytic Entner-Douderoff pathway.

The major steps in the sulfo-ED pathway are:

- oxidation of sulfoquinovose to sulfogluconolactone (catalyzed by sulfoquinovose dehydrogenase with NAD^{+} co-factor);
- hydrolysis of sulfogluconolactone to sulfogluconate acid (catalyzed by sulfogluconolactonase with water);
- dehydration of sulfogluconic acid to 2-keto-3,6-dideoxy-6-sulfogluconate (catalyzed by sulfogluconate dehydratase);
- retro-aldol cleavage of 2-keto-3,6-dideoxy-6-sulfogluconate to give pyruvate and (S)-sulfolactaldehyde (catalyzed by sulfoketogluconate dehydrogenase with NAD^{+} co-factor);
- oxidation of sulfolactaldehyde to (S)-sulfolactate (catalyzed by sulfolactaldehyde dehydrogenase with NAD^{+} co-factor).

== Sulfo-SFT pathway ==
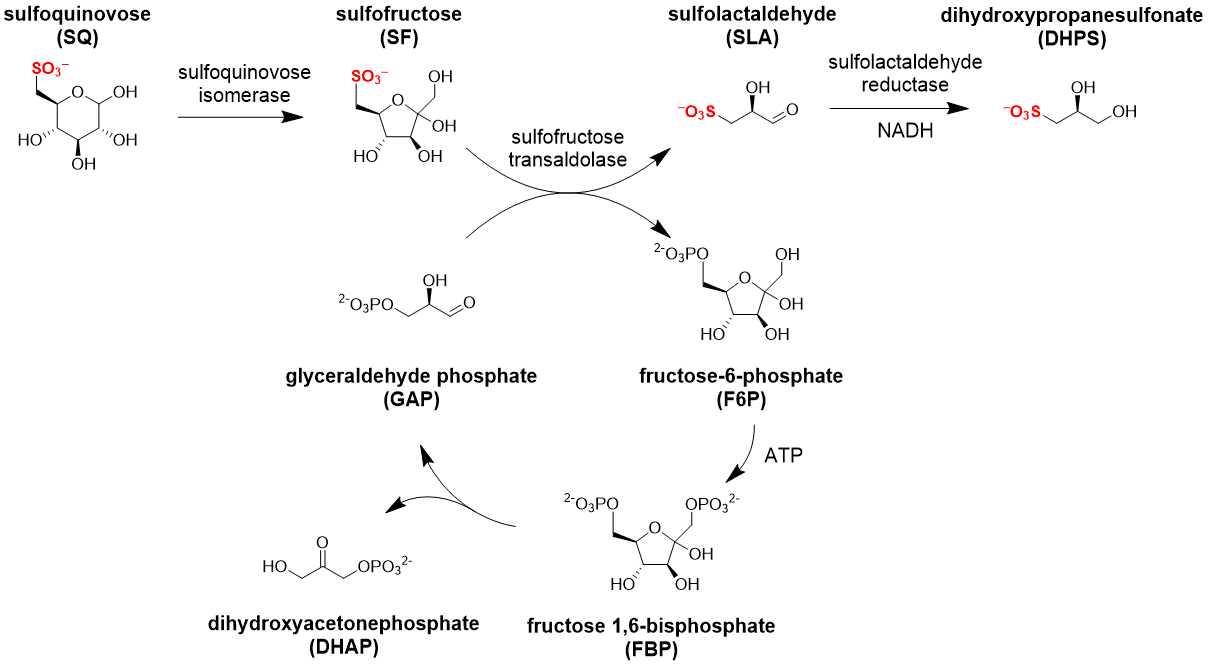
The sulfoglycolytic sulfofructose transaldolase pathway.

The major steps in the sulfo-SFT pathway are:

- isomerization of sulfoquinovose to sulfofructose (catalyzed by sulfoquinovose isomerase);
- transaldol reaction of sulfofructose to release sulfolactaldehyde (catalyzed by sulfofructose transaldolase), and transfer of the C3-(glycerone)-moiety to glyceraldehyde phosphate, yielding fructose-6-phosphate;
- sulfolactaldehyde may be reduced to (S)-2,3-dihydroxypropane-1-sulfonate (catalyzed by sulfolactaldehyde reductase and using NADH as a co-factor), or oxidized to sulfolactate (catalyzed by sulfolactaldehyde dehydrogenase using NAD+ as a co-factor).

The transaldolase can also catalyze transfer of the C3-(glycerone)-moiety to erythrose-4-phosphate, giving sedoheptulose-7-phosphate.

== Sulfo-TK pathway ==
The major steps in the Sulfo-TK pathway are:

- isomerization of sulfoquinovose to sulfofructose (catalyzed by sulfoquinovose isomerase);
- transketol reaction of sulfofructose to release erythrose (catalyzed by sulfofructose transketolase, a thiamine diphosphate dependent enzyme), and transfer of the C2-moiety to glyceraldehyde phosphate, yielding xylulose-5-phosphate (Xu5P).
- 4-Sulfoerythrose is isomerized to 4-sulfoerythrulose (SEu), whereupon a second round of transketolase catalyzed reaction cleaves SE to sulfoacetaldehyde, while the C2-moiety is again transferred to an acceptor molecule, glyceraldehyde phosphate (GAP), yielding a second molecule of xylulose-5-phosphate (Xu5P).
- Finally, the sulfoacetaldehyde is reduced to isethionate and excreted.

The sulfoacetaldehyde may be oxidized to sulfoacetate.

== Degradation of DHPS and SL ==
The C_{3} sulfonates DHPS and SL are metabolized for their carbon content, as well as to mineralize their sulfur content. Metabolism of DHPS typically involves conversion to SL. Metabolism of SL can occur in several ways including:

- elimination of sulfite to afford pyruvate;
- oxidation to sulfopyruvate, transamination to cysteate, and elimination of sulfite to afford pyruvate and ammonia;
- oxidation to sulfopyruvate, decarboxylation to sulfoacetaldehyde, and phosphorylation to afford acetylphosphate and sulfite.

== See also ==
- Glycolysis
