= UDP-sulfoquinovose synthase =

Class of enzymes

UDPsulfoquinovose synthase

Identifiers
- EC no.: 3.13.1.1

Databases
- BRENDA: enzyme data
- ExPASy: NiceZyme view
- KEGG: enzyme entry
- MetaCyc: metabolic pathway
- Rhea: reactions
- PDB structures: RCSB PDB PDBe PDBsum
- Gene Ontology: AmiGO / QuickGO
Search
- PMC: articles
- PubMed: articles
- NCBI: proteins

UDP-sulfoquinovose synthase (EC 3.13.1.1) is an enzyme characterised from Arabidopsis thaliana that catalyzes the conversion of uridine diphosphate glucose (UDP-glucose) to UDP-6-sulfoquinovose:

uridine diphosphate glucose
H_{2}SO_{3}
H_{2}O
UDP-6-sulfoquinovose

The structure of the enzyme has been determined by X-ray crystallography.

In a subsequent reaction, the sulfoquinovose portion of UDP-sulfoquinovose is combined with diacyglycerol to produce the sulfolipid, sulfoquinovosyl diacylglycerol.

This enzyme is a hydrolase, specifically those acting on carbon-sulfur bonds. The systematic name of this enzyme class is UDP-6-sulfo-6-deoxyglucose sulfohydrolase. Other names in common use include sulfite:UDP-glucose sulfotransferase, and UDP-sulfoquinovose synthase.
