= Stf0 sulfotransferase =

Identifiers
- Symbol: Sulphotransf
- Pfam: PF09037
- InterPro: IPR015124
Available protein structures:
- PDB: PDB: 1tex IPR015124 PF09037 (ECOD; PDBsum)
- AlphaFold: IPR015124; PF09037

Stf0 sulfotransferases are essential for the biosynthesis of sulfolipid-1 in prokaryotes. They adopt a structure that belongs to the sulfotransferase superfamily, consisting of a single domain with a core four-stranded parallel beta-sheet flanked by alpha-helices.
