= CD1b =

Mammalian protein found in humans

CD1B

Identifiers
- Aliases: CD1B, CD1, CD1A, R1, CD1b molecule
- External IDs: OMIM: 188360; GeneCards: CD1B
Available structures
PDB	Human UniProt search: PDBe RCSB
PDB	List of PDB id codes 1GZP, 1GZQ, 1UQS, 2H26, 3OV6, 3T8X, 4ONO

Gene location (Human)
Chr.	Chromosome 1 (human)
Band	1q23.1	Start	158,327,951 bp
Band	1q23.1	End	158,331,531 bp
RNA expression pattern
Bgee	Human / Mouse (ortholog); Top expressed in: thymus; testicle; skin of thigh; white blood cell; monocyte; lymph node; granulocyte; cecum; appendix; vulva / n/a; More reference expression data
BioGPS	n/a
Gene ontology
Molecular function	beta-2-microglobulin binding; endogenous lipid antigen binding; lipopeptide binding; protein binding; exogenous lipid antigen binding
Cellular component	integral component of membrane; cell surface; lysosomal membrane; endosome; lysosome; endosome membrane; membrane; plasma membrane; extracellular space; external side of plasma membrane
Biological process	antigen processing and presentation, exogenous lipid antigen via MHC class Ib; adaptive immune response; immune system process; regulation of immune response; positive regulation of T cell mediated cytotoxicity; immune response; antigen processing and presentation, endogenous lipid antigen via MHC class Ib
Sources:Amigo / QuickGO
Orthologs
Databases	NCBI: entry; OMA: entry
Species	Human	Mouse
Entrez	910	n/a
Ensembl	ENSG00000158485	n/a
UniProt	P29016	n/a
RefSeq (mRNA)	NM_001764	n/a
RefSeq (protein)	NP_001755	n/a
Location (UCSC)	Chr 1: 158.33 – 158.33 Mb	n/a
PubMed search		n/a
- Wikidata
View/Edit Human

T-cell surface glycoprotein CD1b is a protein that in humans is encoded by the CD1B gene.

CD1b belongs to group 1 of CD1 family of transmembrane glycoproteins. CD1 molecules are expressed on the surface of numerous different human antigen presenting cells (DCs, monocytes and some thymocytes). This specialised group of glycoproteins present self and non-self lipid-based antigens to specific αβ T-cells. CD1 molecules are structurally related to the major histocompatibility complex (MHC), belonging to MHC class I-like genes. The human CD1 locus is found on chromosome 1 and contains five nonpolymorphic genes (CD1a, CD1b, CD1c, CD1d and CD1e).

== Structure and function ==
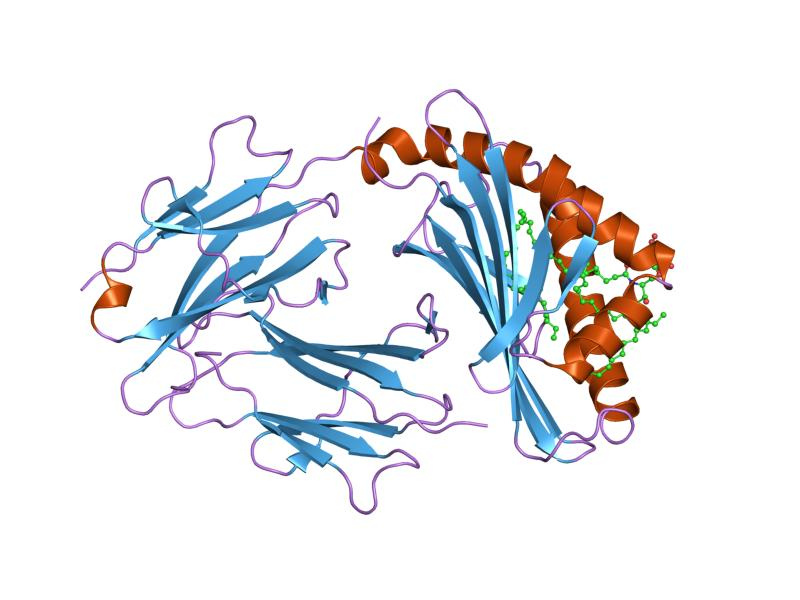
T cell surface glycoprotein CD1b: Gene lokus / 1q23.1; Molecular mass (Da) / 36939; Ag-binding cleft size (Å) / 2,3; Length of antigens (carbons) / 25-80

CD1b molecules (as well as other CD1 and classical MHC I molecules) are formed by membrane-bound glycoprotein composed of three extracellular domains (α1,α2,α3). These extracellular domains are non-covalently associated with β2 microglobulin (which has the function of stabilising protein). This organization forms a narrow hydrophobic binding groove that accommodates lipid-based antigens. The binding groove is made up of four broadly interconnected pockets that are occupied by the alkyl chains of glycolipid and two detergent molecules. Compared to other CD1 molecules this unique arrangement of CD1b provides the possibility of binding a wide spectrum of antigens with various lengths of alkyl chain. Alkyl components of antigens are attached in the hydrophobic groove and a hydrophilic part stands out from the CD1b molecule and thus provides to the TCR a place to bind.

CD1b molecule has the largest antigen-binding cleft within the CD1 family. Whereas the microbial lipids tend to have longer alkyl chains than self endogenous lipids it seems that CD1b is specifically adapted to present microbial lipids (rather than endogenous) to T cells. In the absence of longer microbial lipids, CD1b presents both an endogenous lipid and a scaffold/spacer lipid(s).

== Clinical significance ==
When the immune system does not distinguish self and non-self antigens, it leads to an autoreactive T-cell response. Autoreactive CD1b can recognize for example phosphatidylglycerol, which is common for bacteria but also mammalian mitochondria. This autoantigen is released during a bacterial infection or mitochondrial stress. CD1b also presents endogenous gangliosides to specific T cells so they can commence autoimmune diseases such as multiple sclerosis.

In contrast with major histocompatibility complexes, CD1 molecules have restricted diversity, it could be an interesting marker for immunotherapy and target for development of new drugs.
