= Anton blood group antigen =

The Anton blood group antigen is a cell surface receptor found on some human red blood cells. It has been observed to play a role in Haemophilus influenzae infections. Studies showed that bacterium can adhere to this receptor and cause human red blood cells to agglutinate.

In 1985, this antigen was found to be the same as another called Wj, so it is usually referred as AnWj. In 1991, a study of a family with the trait showed that the phenotype indeed had an inherited character independent of other human blood group systems and in 2024, it was found that the inherited AnWj-negative blood group phenotype is caused by homozygosity for a deletion in the MAL gene that encodes the expression of the Myelin and lymphocyte (MAL) protein.
