= Metazym =

Experimental recombinant enzyme

Metazym (also known as SHP611 or HGT-1110) is an experimental recombinant enzyme that was studied in patients with late infantile metachromatic leukodystrophy (MLD), but found to be ineffective under the conditions of that trial. A subsequent clinical trial was held in 2012 which mainly examined the safety and tolerability of Metazym. the clinical trial also measured the changes in both cerebrospinal fluid (CSF) sulfatide and lysosulfatide levels, and motor function in the children with MLD. The drug became a source of controversy when a family attempted to purchase the drug for their child before it was approved. Jonckheere, Kingma, Eyskens, Bordon, & Jansen (2023) highlight the shift towards the need for newborn screening for metachromatic leukodystrophy as it allows for improved early detection and timely treatment as well.
