= Sulfoquinovosyl diacylglycerol =

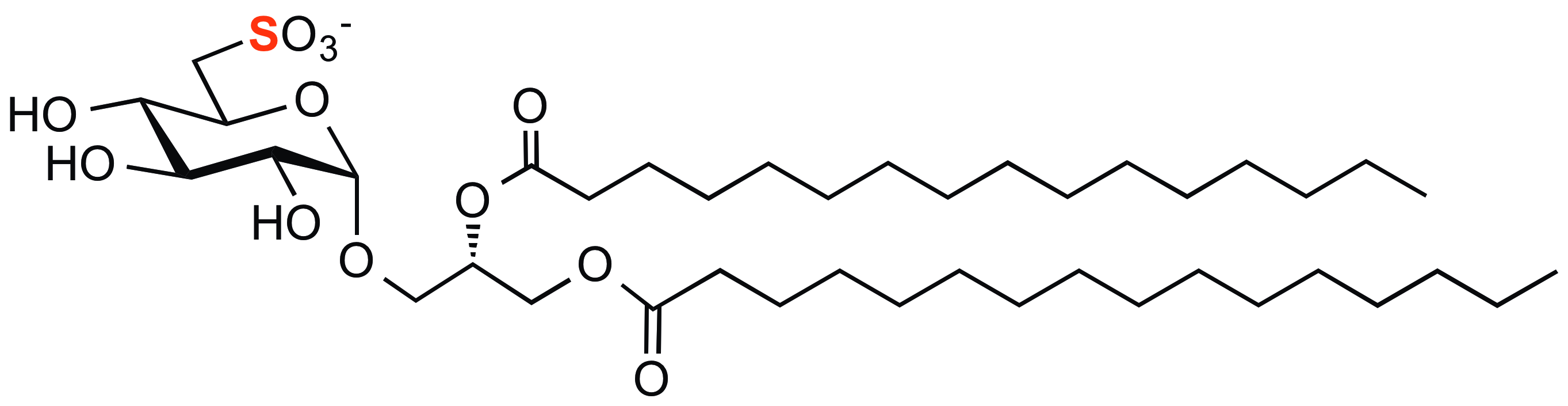
Sulfoquinovosyl diacylglycerol (SQDG), as the dipalmitoyl ester

Sulfoquinovosyl diacylglycerols, abbreviated SQDG, are a class of sulfur-containing phosphorus-free lipids (sulfolipids) found in many photosynthetic organisms.

== Discovery and properties ==
In 1959 A. A. Benson and coworkers discovered a new sulfur-containing lipid in plants and identified it as sulfoquinovosyl diacylglycerol (SQDG). The sulfolipid structure was defined as 1,2-di-O-acyl-3-O-(6-deoxy-6-sulfo-α-D-glucopyranosyl)-sn-glycerol (SQDG). The distinctive feature of this substance is carbon bonded directly to sulfur as C-SO_{3}. Sulfonic acids of this type are chemically stable and strong acids.

== Biological occurrence and functions ==
SQDGs have been found in all photosynthetic plants, algae, cyanobacteria, purple sulfur and non-sulfur bacteria and is localised in the thylakoid membranes, being the most saturated glycolipid.

SQDGs have been found to be closely associated with certain membrane proteins. In some cases the (electrostatic) interactions may be very strong, as suggested by the inability of saturated SQDG molecules associated with purified chloroplast CF0-CF1 ATPase to exchange with other acidic lipids. It was shown also that SQDGs protect CF1 against cold inactivation in the presence of some ATP. CF1 bound to membranes was found to be much more resistant to heat and cold than solubilised protein. Mitochondrial coupling factor F1 is similarly protected by phospholipids and SQDGs although, in that case, both were equally effective.

Information about SQDG and the Rieske protein interaction in the cyt b6f structures is also present. SQDGs seem to be involved in the turnover of cyt f in a similar manner like D1 and raises the question of whether a similar mechanism underlies the role of SQDG in the assembly of both subunits.

Extensive SQDG accumulation was observed in apple shoot bark and wood (Okanenko, 1977) and in pine thylakoid during the autumn hardening, while heat and drought action upon wheat, at NaCl action in the halophyte Aster tripolium.

SQDG also inhibits viral development by interfering with DNA-polymerase and reverse transcriptase activity.

== Biosynthesis ==
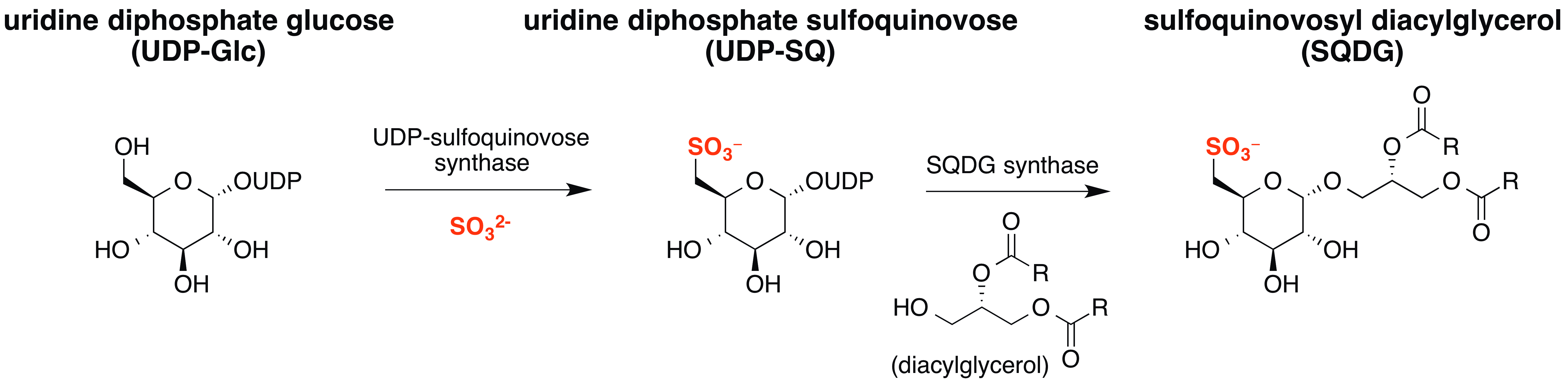
Biosynthesis of sulfoquinovosyl diacylglycerol (SQDG) from UDP-glucose.

In cyanobacteria and plants, SQDG is synthesized in two steps. First, UDP-glucose and sulfite are combined by UDP-sulfoquinovose synthase (SQD1) to produce UDP-sulfoquinovose. Second, the sulfoquinovose portion of UDP-sulfoquinovose is transferred to diacylglycerol by the glycosyltransferase SQDG synthase, to form SQDG.

== Degradation ==
SQDGs degrade during sulfur starvation in some species such as Chlamydomonas reinhardtii. This response is for the redistribution of its sulfur to make new protein. A wide range of bacteria cleave SQDG to form sulfoquinovose, and then metabolize the sulfoquinovose through a process termed sulfoglycolysis. SQDG are cleaved by enzymes termed sulfoquinovosidases.

== See also ==
- Lipid
- Membrane lipids
- Sulfoquinovose
- Sulfoglycolysis
