= LSMEM1 =

Protein-coding gene in humans

Identifiers
- Aliases: LSMEM1, C7orf53, leucine rich single-pass membrane protein 1
- External IDs: MGI: 2685735; GeneCards: LSMEM1

Gene location (Human)
Chr.	Chromosome 7 (human)
Band	7q31.1	Start	112,480,853 bp
Band	7q31.1	End	112,491,062 bp

Gene location (Mouse)
Chr.	Chromosome 12 (mouse)
Band	12|12 B1	Start	40,225,492 bp
Band	12|12 B1	End	40,249,489 bp
RNA expression pattern
Bgee	Human / Mouse (ortholog); Top expressed in: muscle of thigh; testicle; blood; body of pancreas; gastrocnemius muscle; skeletal muscle tissue; right lobe of liver; cerebellar hemisphere; right hemisphere of cerebellum; gastric mucosa / Top expressed in: quadriceps femoris muscle; skeletal muscle tissue; heart; muscle of thigh; zone of skin; embryo; esophagus; thymus; morula; cerebellum; More reference expression data
BioGPS	n/a
Orthologs
Databases	NCBI: entry; OMA: entry
Species	Human	Mouse
Entrez	286006	380755
Ensembl	ENSG00000181016	ENSMUSG00000071342
UniProt	Q8N8F7	Q3UQS2
RefSeq (mRNA)	NM_001134468; NM_182597	NM_001033437
RefSeq (protein)	NP_001127940; NP_872403	NP_001028609
Location (UCSC)	Chr 7: 112.48 – 112.49 Mb	Chr 12: 40.23 – 40.25 Mb
PubMed search
- Wikidata
View/Edit Human	View/Edit Mouse

Leucine-Rich Single-Pass Membrane Protein 1 (LSMEM1) is a protein that, in humans, is encoded by the LSMEM1 gene.

== Gene ==
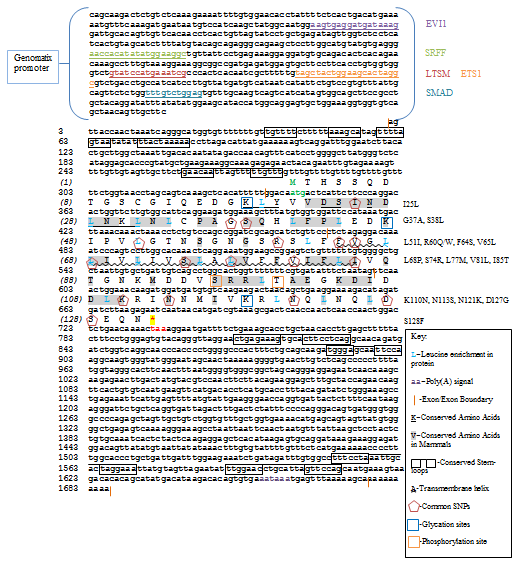
Conceptual translation of LSMEM1 for humans

In humans, LSMEM1 is located on chromosome 7q31.1. LSMEM1 neighbors the gene IFRD1 in humans. Aliases for LSMEM1 include C7orf53, chromosome 7 open reading frame 53, and FLJ39575. The human mRNA is 1686 base pairs long and the gene contains 5 exons. The human mRNA also has a 5' UTR and a 3' UTR. The 5' UTR goes from mRNA position 1 to 341, and the 3' UTR goes from mRNA position 738 to 1686.

== Protein ==
The protein LSMEM1 encodes in humans is 131 amino acids long and has a molecular weight ranging from 14.2 to 14.5 kDal. Its isoelectric point in humans is about 5, making it slightly acidic. LSMEM1 is an integral membrane protein and a transmembrane protein Besides its transmembrane segment, it is mainly made up of coils and relatively few beta strands. As its name implies, LSMEM1 only has one transmembrane segment. The predicted post-translational modifications to the human LSMEM1 protein are glycation and phosphorylation. There is no predicted signal peptide for the human protein.

== Homology/evolution ==
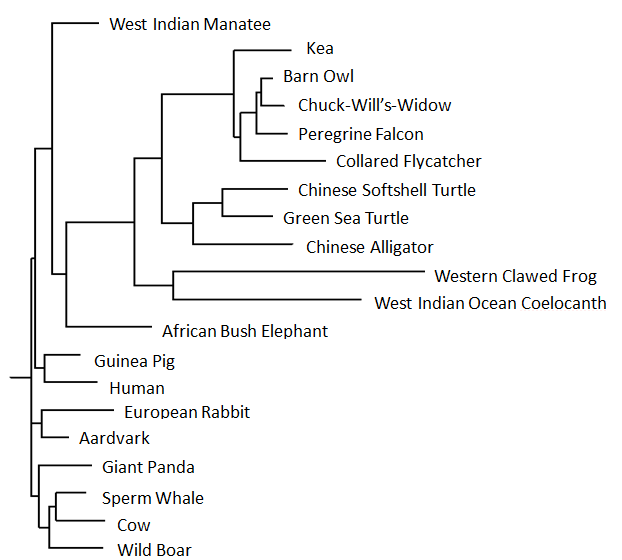
Phylogenetic tree for select orthologs of LSMEM1

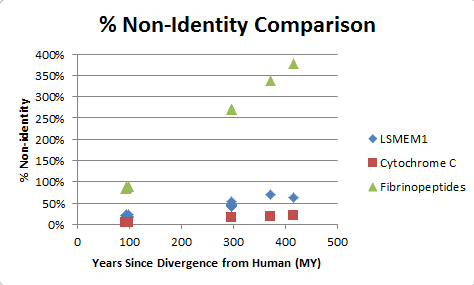
Human LSMEM1 evolutionary rate in comparison to a fast-evolving and a slow-evolving protein.

There are no known paralogs in humans for LSMEM1. Orthologous proteins exist mainly in mammals, birds, and reptiles. There are also more distant orthologs in amphibians and sarcopterygii. LSMEM1 does not show up in invertebrates, fungi, or prokaryotes. LSMEM1 also contains a conserved domain of unknown function DUF4577. When the human protein encoded by LSMEM1 is compared to a known quickly evolving protein (fibrinopeptides) and a known slowly evolving protein (cytochrome c), LSMEM1 appears to be slowly evolving.

== Expression ==
In humans, LSMEM1 is very highly expressed in skeletal muscle. In humans, LSMEM1 also shows high expression in nerve tissue, moderate expression in the uterus, testis, bone marrow, heart, and intestines, and low expression in the brain and pancreas. It also shows expression in both the fetal and adult stages of life in humans.

LSMEM1 is predicted to have a 615 base pair promoter in humans just upstream of its transcriptional start site.

== Interacting proteins ==
Some transcription factors that are predicted to bind to the promoter of LSMEM1 in humans are: SRF, EVI1, SOX, ETS, LTSM, and TALE transcription factors. Many of the transcription factors thought to bind to the LSMEM1 promoter in humans have activity in biological processes like cell differentiation, cell cycle, cell growth, and development.

There are 3 main proteins thought to interact with the human protein encoded by the gene LSMEM1 that were determined via two-hybrid screening (LSMEM2 and MAL) and reconstituted complex (APP) experiments. A reconstituted complex experiment detects interactions between purified proteins in vitro. The 3 proteins thought to interact with LSMEM1 are: MAL, APP, and LSMEM2. All three of these interacting proteins are integral membrane proteins, just as LSMEM1 is.

== Clinical significance ==
LSMEM1 expression levels in humans are greatly decreased in septic skeletal muscle. For humans, the LSMEM1 protein has 17 SNP missense mutations within its coding sequence. The LSMEM1 protein has been shown to be prevalent in the serum of patients with Parkinson's disease and that it binds to diagnostic biomarkers of Parkinson's Disease as a protein antigen.
