= CLEC2D =

Protein-coding gene in humans

Identifiers
- Aliases: CLEC2D, CLAX, LLT1, OCIL, C-type lectin domain family 2 member D
- External IDs: OMIM: 605659; GeneCards: CLEC2D
Available structures
PDB	Human UniProt search: PDBe RCSB
PDB	List of PDB id codes 4QKG, 4QKH, 4QKI, 4QKJ, 4WCO

Gene location (Human)
Chr.	Chromosome 12 (human)
Band	12p13.31	Start	9,664,969 bp
Band	12p13.31	End	9,699,553 bp
RNA expression pattern
Bgee	Human / Mouse (ortholog); Top expressed in: granulocyte; Achilles tendon; spleen; lymph node; blood; appendix; right uterine tube; epithelium of colon; monocyte; bone marrow cell / n/a; More reference expression data
BioGPS	n/a
Gene ontology
Molecular function	transmembrane signaling receptor activity; carbohydrate binding; protein binding
Cellular component	plasma membrane; membrane; integral component of membrane; endoplasmic reticulum; integral component of plasma membrane; cell surface
Biological process	regulation of immune response; cell surface receptor signaling pathway
Sources:Amigo / QuickGO
Orthologs
Databases	NCBI: entry; OMA: entry
Species	Human	Mouse
Entrez	29121	n/a
Ensembl	ENSG00000069493	n/a
UniProt	Q9UHP7	n/a
RefSeq (mRNA)	NM_001004419; NM_001004420; NM_001197317; NM_001197318; NM_001197319 NM_013269	n/a
RefSeq (protein)	NP_001004419; NP_001184246; NP_001184247; NP_001184248; NP_037401	n/a
Location (UCSC)	Chr 12: 9.66 – 9.7 Mb	n/a
PubMed search		n/a
- Wikidata
View/Edit Human

C-type lectin domain family 2 member D is a protein that in humans is encoded by the CLEC2D gene.

This gene encodes a member of the natural killer cell receptor C-type lectin family. The encoded protein inhibits osteoclast formation and contains a transmembrane domain near the N-terminus as well as the C-type lectin-like extracellular domain. Several alternatively spliced transcript variants have been identified, but the full-length nature of every transcript has not been defined. CLEC2D encodes the gene for the Lectin Like Transcript-1 (LLT1) protein which is a functional ligand for the human NKR-P1A receptor, encoded by the KLRB1 gene. In mice, there are many orthologs of the CLEC2D gene, and the presumed homolog is Clr-b/Ocil (Clec2d). Clr-b has been implicated in missing-self recognition by natural killer cells through engagement of the NKR-P1B receptor.
