= Sulfoquinovose =

Names
- IUPAC name 6-Deoxy-6-sulfo-D-glucopyranose

Identifiers
CAS Number	3458-06-8
3D model (JSmol)	Interactive image
ChEMBL	ChEMBL77198
ChemSpider	9055808
PubChem CID	10880539
UNII	LUB8EVF2QE
CompTox Dashboard (EPA)	DTXSID90956082
- InChI: InChI=1S/C6H12O8S/c7-3-2(1-15(11,12)13)14-6(10)5(9)4(3)8/h2-10H,1H2,(H,11,12,13)/t2-,3-,4+,5-,6?/m1/s1
- SMILES: O=S(=O)(O)C[C@H]1OC(O)[C@H](O)[C@@H](O)[C@@H]1O

Properties
Chemical formula	C_{6}H_{12}O_{8}S
Molar mass	244.21 g·mol^{−1}
Melting point	132–138 °C (270–280 °F; 405–411 K) (dec.)
- Except where otherwise noted, data are given for materials in their standard state (at 25 °C [77 °F], 100 kPa). Infobox references

Sulfoquinovose, also known as 6-sulfoquinovose and 6-deoxy-6-sulfo-D-glucopyranose, is a monosaccharide sugar that is found as a building block in the sulfolipid sulfoquinovosyl diacylglycerol (SQDG). Sulfoquinovose is a sulfonic acid derivative of glucose, the sulfonic acid group is introduced into the sugar by the enzyme UDP-sulfoquinovose synthase (SQD1). Sulfoquinovose is degraded through a metabolic process termed sulfoglycolysis. The half-life for mutarotation of sulfoquinovose at pD 7.5 and 26C is 299 minutes.

== See also ==
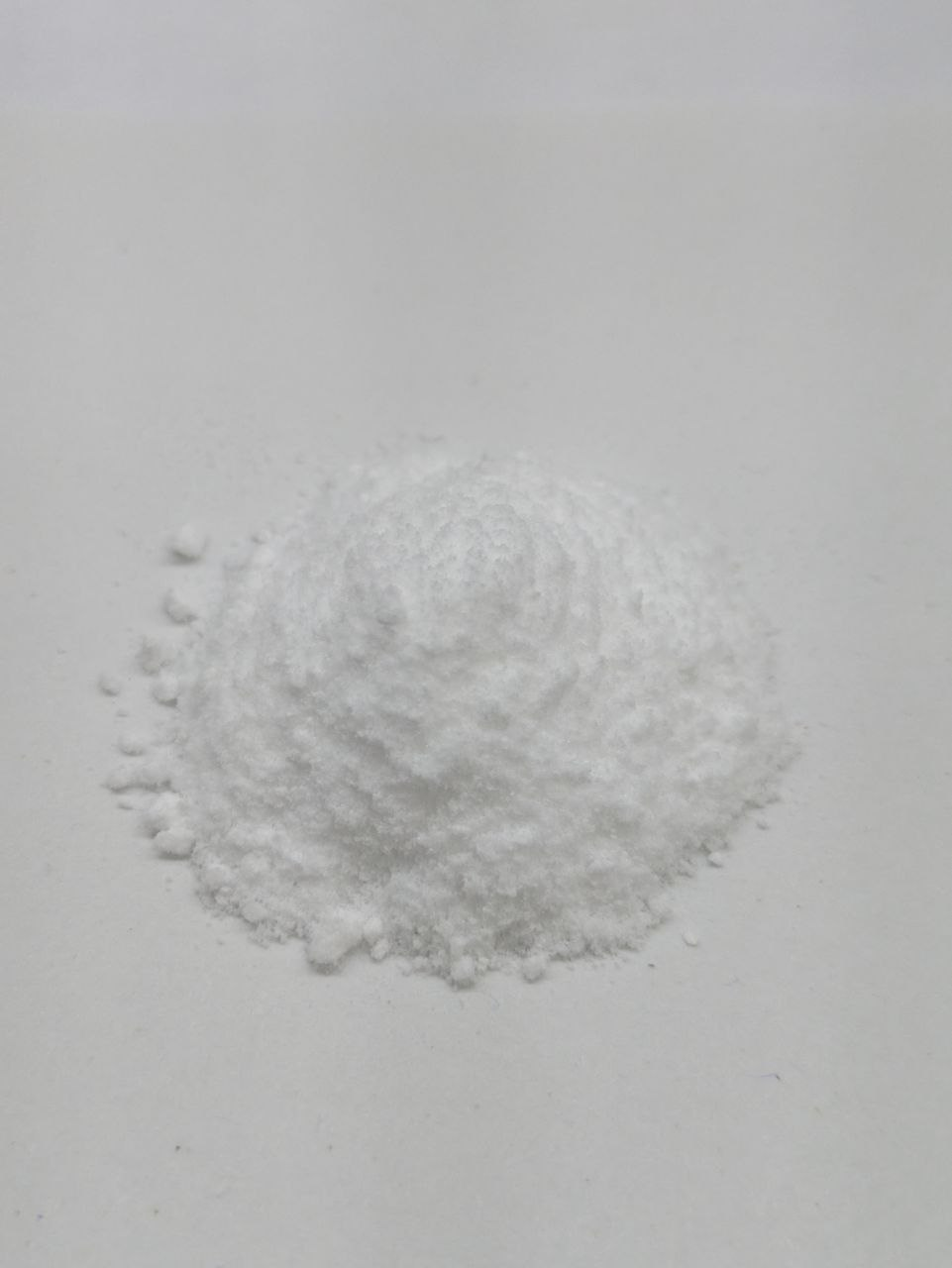
- Sodium salt of sulfoquinovose
  Sulfolipid
- Sulfoglycolysis
