= Metachromatic leukodystrophy =

- Other names: MLD, Arylsulfatase A deficiency, ARSA deficiency
- Sulfatide
- Specialty: Endocrinology, neurology
- Symptoms: Progressive neurologic decline
- Complications: Dementia, seizures, loss of motor skills
- Usual onset: Late infantile (1–2 years), juvenile (3–20 years) or adulthood (around 40s)
- Duration: Late infantile (3–10 years), juvenile and adult (varies)
- Types: Late infantile, juvenile, or adult
- Causes: Lysosomal storage disease
- Diagnostic method: Enzyme based and genetics
- Treatment: HSCT (pre-symptomatic), Gene therapy (late infantile), Palliative
- Prognosis: fatal
- Frequency: 1 in 40,000 births

Metachromatic leukodystrophy (MLD) is a lysosomal storage disease which is commonly listed in the family of leukodystrophies as well as among the sphingolipidoses as it affects the metabolism of sphingolipids. Leukodystrophies affect the growth and/or development of myelin, the fatty covering that acts as an insulator around nerve fibers throughout the central and peripheral nervous systems. MLD involves cerebroside sulfate accumulation. Metachromatic leukodystrophy, like most enzyme deficiencies, has an autosomal recessive inheritance pattern.

== Signs and symptoms ==
Like many other genetic disorders that affect lipid metabolism, there are several forms of MLD, which are late infantile, juvenile, and adult.

- In the late infantile form, which is the most common form of MLD (50–60%), affected children begin having difficulty walking after the first year of life, usually at 15–24 months. Symptoms include muscle wasting and weakness, muscle rigidity, developmental delays, progressive loss of vision leading to blindness, convulsions, impaired swallowing, paralysis, and dementia. Children may become comatose. Untreated, most children with this form of MLD die by age 5, often much sooner.
- Children with the juvenile form of MLD (onset between 3 and 10 years of age) usually begin with impaired school performance, mental deterioration, and dementia, then develop symptoms similar to the late infantile form but with slower progression. Age of death is variable, but normally within 10 to 15 years of symptom onset. Some patients can live for several decades after onset. A recent trend is to try to distinguish early-juvenile (ages 3–7) and late-juvenile forms of the disease. Generally, early-juveniles have motor skill declines as their first symptoms while late-juveniles show cognitive declines first.
- The adult form commonly begins after age 16 often with an onset in the 4th or 5th decade of life and presents as a psychiatric disorder or progressive dementia. Adult-onset MLD usually progresses more slowly than the late infantile and juvenile forms, with a protracted course of a decade or more.

Palliative care can help with many of the symptoms and usually improves the quality of life and longevity.

Carriers have low enzyme levels compared to their family population ("normal" levels vary from family to family) but even low enzyme levels are adequate to process the body's sulfatide.

== Causes ==
Diagram showing the disrupted pathway

MLD is directly caused by a deficiency of the enzyme arylsulfatase A (ARSA) and is characterized by enzyme activity in leukocytes that is less than 10% of normal controls. However, assay of the ARSA enzyme activity alone is not sufficient for diagnosis; ARSA pseudodeficiency, which is characterized by enzyme activity that is 5~20% of normal controls does not cause MLD. Without this enzyme, sulfatides build up in many tissues of the body, eventually destroying the myelin sheath of the nervous system. The excess sulfatides stored in glial cells and neurons may contribute to initial disease progression and symptomatology. However, sulfatides ultimately result in functional impairment of oligodendrocytes and Schwann cells, leading to widespread demyelination, resulting in the neurological impairments hallmark of MLD. The myelin sheath is a fatty covering that protects nerve fibers. Without it, the nerves in the brain (central nervous system – CNS) and the peripheral nerves (peripheral nervous system – PNS) cease to function properly, resulting in mobility impairments and intellectual decline.

Arylsulfatase A is activated by saposin B (Sap B), a non-enzymatic proteinaceous cofactor. When the arylsulfatase A enzyme level is normal but the sulfatides are still high – meaning that they are not being broken down because the enzyme is not activated – the resulting disease is saposin B deficiency, which presents similar to MLD. Saposin B deficiency is very rare, much more rare than traditional MLD. The enzyme that is present is not "enabled" to a normal level of efficiency and can't break down the sulfatides which results in all of the same MLD symptoms and progression.

A 2011 study contended sulfatide is not completely responsible for MLD because it is non-toxic. It has been suggested that lysosulfatide, sulfatide which has had its acyl group removed, plays a role because of its cytotoxic properties in vitro.

== Genetics ==
Metachromatic leukodystrophy has an autosomal recessive pattern of inheritance.

MLD has an autosomal recessive inheritance pattern. The inheritance probabilities per birth are as follows:

- If both parents are carriers:
  - 25% (1 in 4) of children will have the disease
  - 50% (2 in 4) of children will be carriers, but unaffected
  - 25% (1 in 4) children will be free of MLD – unaffected child that is not a carrier
- If one parent is affected and one is free of MLD:
  - 0% (0) children will have the disorder – only one parent is affected, other parent always gives normal gene
  - 100% (4 in 4) children will be carriers (but unaffected)
- If one parent is a carrier and the other is free of MLD:
  - 50% (2 in 4) children will be carriers (but unaffected)
  - 50% (2 in 4) children will be free of MLD – unaffected child that is not a carrier

In addition to these frequencies, there is a 'pseudo'-deficiency that affects 7–15% of the population. People with the pseudo deficiency do not have any MLD problems unless they also have affected status. With the current diagnostic tests, Pseudo-deficiency reports as low enzyme levels but sulfatide is processed normally so MLD symptoms do not exist. This phenomenon wreaks havoc with traditional approaches to Newborn Screening so new screening methods are being developed.

== Diagnosis ==
Clinical examination and MRI are often the first steps in an MLD diagnosis. MRI can be indicative of MLD but is not adequate as a confirming test. An ARSA-A enzyme level blood test with a confirming urinary sulfatide test is the best biochemical test for MLD. Urinary sulfatide is important to distinguish between MLD and pseudo-MLD blood results. Genomic sequencing may also confirm MLD, however, there are likely more mutations than the over 200 already known to cause MLD that are not yet ascribed to MLD that cause MLD so in those cases a biochemical test is still warranted.

=== Newborn screening ===
MLD Foundation formally launched a newborn screening initiative in late 2017. The screen development started in the early 2010s at the University of Washington, by Professor Michael H. Gelb. A deidentified pilot study was launched in April 2016 in Washington state. Positive results led to MLD being included in the ScreenPlus identified baby research project in New York state, which is currently scheduled to launch in Q1'2021.

== Treatment ==
There is currently no approved treatment for MLD in symptomatic late infantile patients or for juvenile and adult-onset with advanced symptoms. There is a treatment for pre-symptomatic patients and certain others with the condition.

Symptomatic patients typically receive clinical treatment focused on pain and symptom management.Pre-symptomatic late infantile MLD patients, as well as those with juvenile or adult MLD that are either presymptomatic or displaying mild symptoms, can consider bone marrow transplantation (including stem cell transplantation), which may slow down the progression of the disease in the central nervous system. However, results in the peripheral nervous system have been less dramatic, and the long-term results of these therapies have been mixed.

In 2020 the European Medical Agency approved the cell therapy drug atidarsagene autotemcel (Libmeldy) for the treatment of infantile and juvenile forms of metachromatic leukodystrophy in Europe. In 2024 the US Food and Drug Administration (FDA) approved atidarsagene autotemcel (Lenmeldy) for use with pre-symptomatic late infantile, pre-symptomatic early juvenile or early symptomatic juvenile metachromatic leukodystrophy.

Presymptomatic patients can be cured with one treatment of atidarsagene autotemcel, which is a type of advanced medicine called a ‘gene therapy’. This type of medicine works by delivering genes into the body. The active substance in atidarsagene autotemcel is CD34+ stem cells. They are retrieved from the patient's own bone marrow or blood. They are then modified to contain a copy of the gene to make functional ARSA. After confirming that the cells contain an active copy of the gene, they are injected into the patient's bone marrow. CD34+ cells can divide to produce other sorts of blood cells.

=== Research directions ===
Several therapy options are currently being investigated using clinical trials primarily in late infantile patients. These therapies include gene therapy, enzyme replacement therapy (ERT), substrate reduction therapy (SRT), and potentially enzyme enhancement therapy (EET). In addition to the clinical trials, there are several other pre-clinical gene therapy research projects underway.

== Epidemiology ==
The incidence of metachromatic leukodystrophy is estimated to occur in 1 in 40,000 to 1 in 160,000 individuals worldwide. There is a much higher incidence in certain genetically isolated populations, such as 1 in 75 in Habbanites (a small group of Jews who immigrated to Israel from southern Arabia), 1 in 2,500 in the western portion of the Navajo Nation, and 1 in 8,000 among Arab groups in Israel.

As an autosomal recessive disease, 1 in 40,000 equates to a 1 in 100 carrier frequency in the general population.

In the US, there are an estimated 3,600 MLD births per year, with 1,900 alive; in Europe 3,100, and worldwide 49,000 alive.

MLD is considered a rare disease in the US and other countries.

== Research ==
=== Bone marrow and stem cell transplant therapies ===
- Several trials are underway to continue to improve the effectiveness and reduce the risks of bone marrow and stem cell transplants.

=== Gene therapy ===
(current as of April 2021)

Two different approaches to gene therapy are currently being researched for MLD.

- Gene therapy with an autologous stem cell transplant – Italian researchers at the San Raffaele Telethon Institute tested a novel approach combining gene therapy with an autologous stem cell transplant.
  - Gene therapy for late infantile and early juvenile patients was approved by the European Commission in December 2020, after receiving a favorable European Medicines Agency Committee for Medicinal Products for Human Use (CHMP) review in October 2020. The product is being marketed in the EU as Libmeldy. It is a gene therapy medicinal product, for which CD34+ haematopoietic stem and progenitor cells are collected either from the patient's own bone marrow or mobilised peripheral blood. These cells are transduced ex vivo using a lentiviral vector encoding the human arylsulfatase A gene to insert a functional gene to produce the ARSA enzyme. When the modified cells are transplanted back into the patient as a one-time infusion, the cells have been shown to produce the missing ARSA enzyme. The children by the age of five were all in good condition and going to kindergarten when normally by this age, children with the disease can not even speak. Additional information can be found on the MLD Foundation's Gene Therapy page and at the Clinical Trials.gov site.
  - In November 2020, Orchard Therapeutics acknowledged IND discussions with the FDA as the part of their effort to seek FDA approval in the USA.
  - A trial for late juveniles was launched in February 2020.
  - Orchard Therapeutics acquired the gene therapy IP from GSK in April 2018.
  - Recruiting for the Phase I/II Clinical Trial formally started on March 24, 2010, after approval from the Italian Authorities. Recruiting the initial cohort of 8 patients was completed in mid-March 2013. The trial was to test the efficacy and safety of autologous (using the patient's cells) hematopoietic stem cell transplantation (HSCT) after genetic modification to deliver a super-therapeutic (over-expressing) ARSA enzyme to the nervous system by the route of the blood cells. Using the patient's stem cells with genetic correction should reduce or eliminate the complications of graft vs. host disease and provide a long-term solution to proper ARSA expression in MLD patients. Bench and animal tests showed positive results. The researchers published 2-year outcomes for the first three patients in July 2013. Results were described as promising.
  - The Phase I/II clinical trial is complete. No additional patients are being recruited while the data is analyzed and work progresses to improve the manufacturability and repeatability of the technology while expansion to other geographies to increase access is being considered.
  - Recruiting was completed for the 20-patient cohort in April 2015, which includes an expansion in December 2014 to add 6 additional patients.
  - Inclusion criteria are pre-symptomatic late infantile and both pre-and early-symptomatic juveniles. See details on inclusion criteria and the trial protocol here.
  - The trial was at a single center at the San Raffaele Institute in Milan, Italy. All costs were to be paid by the researchers. This was a 3-year study. In March 2013, the last of the 8 primary trial patients started therapy. The trial had several compassionate access patients and ultimately was expanded to 20 patients.
  - In late 2013 GSK exercised its option for the San Rafaelle gene therapy technology and is working with the Milan Investigators to prepare for the next phase of study.
- Intracerebral Gene therapy – A Phase I/II Clinical Trial started recruiting in Paris in late March, 2013 for an Intracerebral Gene Therapy clinical trial where special "vectors" carrying genetically modified material are directly injected into a dozen sites in the brain. The hope is that the corrected cells and the enzyme they produce will then diffuse into surrounding areas of the brain. Extensive work in the lab and some encouraging ALD studies provided the basis for this trial. This trial was subsequently terminated before completion.

=== Enzyme replacement therapy (ERT) ===
(current as of February 2021)

- Takeda acquired the MLD ERT from Shire in early 2018 and continues to develop and studying their intrathecal SHP 611 (formerly HGT-1110) ERT [Enzyme Replacement Therapy].
- Clinical Trial
  - A third global trial studying the late infantile form of MLD for 42 patients aged 6 – 72 months launched in April 2019 and was fully recruited in January 2021. This is the first time ERT study sites are open in the US.
  - Clinical trial information & inclusion criteria can be found on the MLD Foundation's ERT page and at the Clinical Trials.gov site.

=== Substrate reduction therapy ===
- Biomarin South (formerly Zacharon before being acquired by Biomarin in January 2013) from San Diego had initiated a drug discovery program for MLD. This program is based on using assays that measure sulfatide accumulation in cultured fibroblasts as a means to discover and develop small-molecule drugs for MLD. (This approach differs from other approaches that have measured enzyme activity to discover effective drugs.) As of July 2011, Zacharon has begun adapting the assays it developed for other lysosomal storage diseases so that they can be employed to discover and develop drugs for MLD. (current March 2013)
- The Cooper Health System (New Jersey) sponsored a clinical trial underway to determine the safety and efficacy of a Vitamin K antagonist (Warfarin) in treating Metachromatic Leukodystrophy (MLD) in 2009. No results are known to have been published. (current March 2013)

=== Natural history studies ===
- A natural history study (NHS) launched in Washington, DC in January 2014 to study 30 patients with additional study centers opened in the US, Europe, South America, Southeast Asia, and South America. Due to challenges in recruiting this study has been cancelled.
- A natural history study has been underway in Pittsburgh, PA since November 2012.

=== Metazym drug studies ===
Metazym is an experimental recombinant enzyme that was studied in patients with late infantile metachromatic leukodystrophy, but found to be ineffective under the conditions of that trial. A subsequent clinical trial is ongoing. The drug became a source of controversy when a family attempted to purchase the drug for their child before it was approved. Jonckheere, Kingma, Eyskens, Bordon, & Jansen (2023) highlight the shift towards the need for newborn screening for metachromatic leukodystrophy as it allows for improved early detection and timely treatment as well.
