= CD1A =

Protein-coding gene in humans

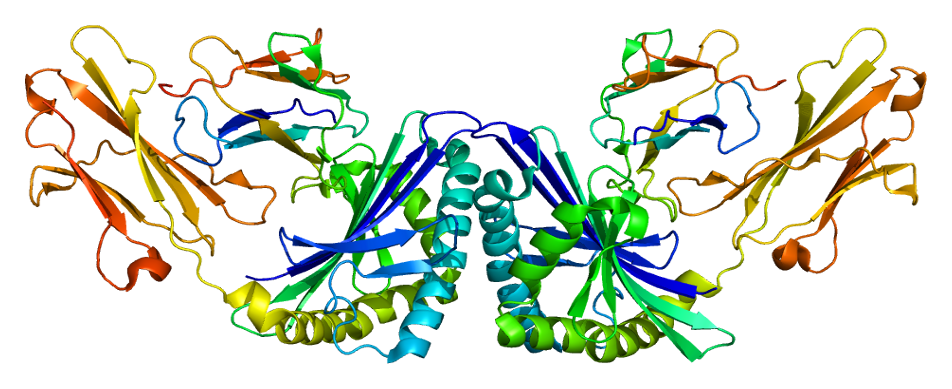

Identifiers
- Aliases: CD1A, CD1, FCB6, HTA1, R4, T6, CD1a molecule
- External IDs: OMIM: 188370; GeneCards: CD1A
Available structures
PDB	Human UniProt search: PDBe RCSB
PDB	List of PDB id codes 1ONQ, 1XZ0, 4X6C, 4X6D, 4X6E, 4X6F

Gene location (Human)
Chr.	Chromosome 1 (human)
Band	1q23.1	Start	158,254,424 bp
Band	1q23.1	End	158,258,269 bp
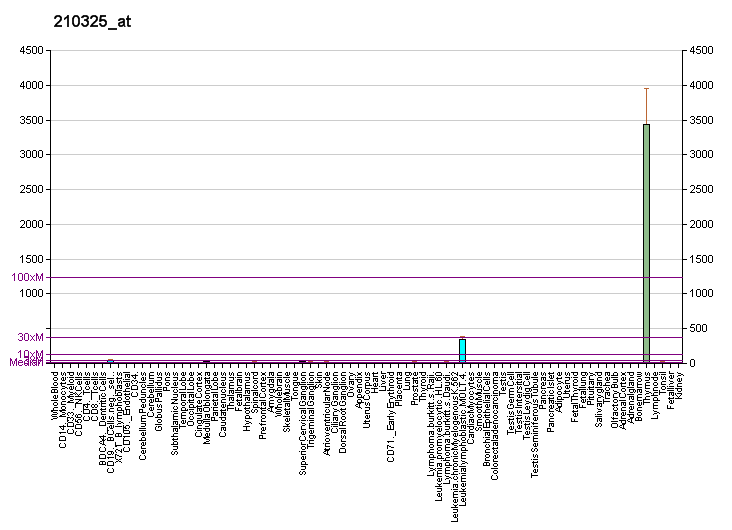
RNA expression pattern
Bgee	Human / Mouse (ortholog); Top expressed in: thymus; skin of thigh; skin of hip; testicle; skin of arm; gums; gingival epithelium; skin of abdomen; monocyte; vulva / n/a; More reference expression data
BioGPS	More reference expression data
Gene ontology
Molecular function	beta-2-microglobulin binding; endogenous lipid antigen binding; protein binding; exogenous lipid antigen binding; lipopeptide binding
Cellular component	integral component of membrane; membrane raft; endosome; integral component of plasma membrane; endosome membrane; membrane; plasma membrane; cell surface; extracellular space; external side of plasma membrane
Biological process	antigen processing and presentation, exogenous lipid antigen via MHC class Ib; adaptive immune response; immune system process; immune response; regulation of immune response; positive regulation of T cell mediated cytotoxicity; antigen processing and presentation, endogenous lipid antigen via MHC class Ib
Sources:Amigo / QuickGO
Orthologs
Databases	NCBI: entry; OMA: entry
Species	Human	Mouse
Entrez	909	n/a
Ensembl	ENSG00000158477	n/a
UniProt	P06126	n/a
RefSeq (mRNA)	NM_001763; NM_001320652	n/a
RefSeq (protein)	NP_001307581; NP_001754	n/a
Location (UCSC)	Chr 1: 158.25 – 158.26 Mb	n/a
PubMed search		n/a
- Wikidata
View/Edit Human

CD1a (Cluster of Differentiation 1a) is a human protein encoded by the CD1A gene.

This gene encodes a member of the CD1 family of transmembrane glycoproteins, which are structurally related to the major histocompatibility complex (MHC) proteins and form heterodimers with beta-2-microglobulin. The CD1 proteins mediate the presentation of primarily lipid and glycolipid antigens of self or microbial origin to T cells. The human genome contains five CD1 family genes organized in a cluster on chromosome 1. The CD1 family members are thought to differ in their cellular localization and specificity for particular lipid ligands. The protein encoded by this gene localizes to the plasma membrane and to recycling vesicles of the early endocytotic system. Alternatively spliced transcript variants have been observed, but their biological validity has not been determined. Transcript levels of the CD1A gene are upregulated in the lung parenchyma of smokers.
