= Myelin and lymphocyte protein =

Protein-coding gene in the species Homo sapiens

MAL

Identifiers
- Aliases: MAL, mal, T-cell differentiation protein, mal, T cell differentiation protein, MVP17, VIP17
- External IDs: OMIM: 188860; MGI: 892970; GeneCards: MAL

Gene location (Human)
Chr.	Chromosome 2 (human)
Band	2q11.1	Start	95,025,677 bp
Band	2q11.1	End	95,053,992 bp

Gene location (Mouse)
Chr.	Chromosome 2 (mouse)
Band	2|2 F1	Start	127,475,146 bp
Band	2|2 F1	End	127,498,615 bp
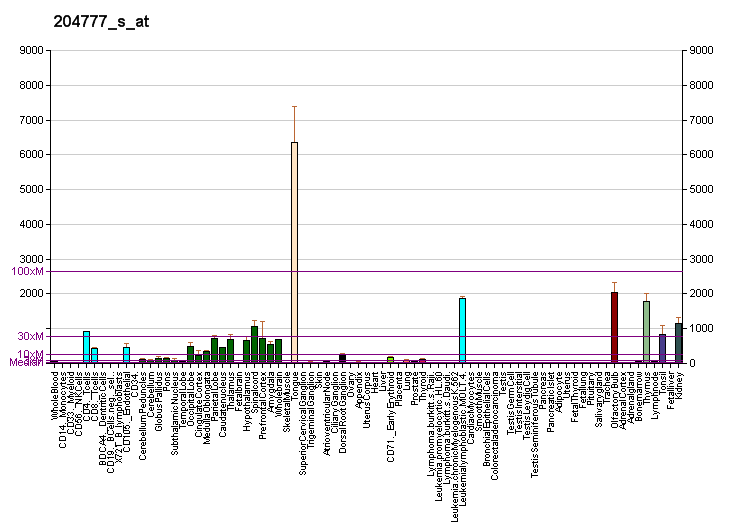
RNA expression pattern
Bgee	Human / Mouse (ortholog); Top expressed in: mucosa of pharynx; buccal mucosa cell; renal medulla; body of tongue; oral cavity; inferior ganglion of vagus nerve; olfactory bulb; amniotic fluid; inferior olivary nucleus; C1 segment / Top expressed in: transitional epithelium of urinary bladder; epithelium of stomach; globus pallidus; conjunctival fornix; ventral tegmental area; mucous cell of stomach; deep cerebellar nuclei; sciatic nerve; lateral geniculate nucleus; pyloric antrum; More reference expression data
BioGPS	More reference expression data
Gene ontology
Molecular function	peptidase activator activity involved in apoptotic process; protein binding; lipid binding; structural constituent of myelin sheath
Cellular component	apical plasma membrane; endoplasmic reticulum; membrane; integral component of membrane; membrane raft; plasma membrane raft; hinge region between urothelial plaques of apical plasma membrane; extrinsic component of membrane
Biological process	positive regulation of extrinsic apoptotic signaling pathway via death domain receptors; central nervous system development; cell differentiation; membrane raft polarization; apical protein localization; apoptotic process; myelination; protein localization to paranode region of axon; protein insertion into plasma membrane
Sources:Amigo / QuickGO
Orthologs
Databases	NCBI: entry; OMA: entry
Species	Human	Mouse
Entrez	4118	17153
Ensembl	ENSG00000172005	ENSMUSG00000027375
UniProt	P21145	O09198
RefSeq (mRNA)	NM_022440; NM_002371; NM_022438; NM_022439	NM_001171187; NM_010762
RefSeq (protein)	NP_002362; NP_071883; NP_071884; NP_071885	NP_001164658; NP_034892
Location (UCSC)	Chr 2: 95.03 – 95.05 Mb	Chr 2: 127.48 – 127.5 Mb
PubMed search
- Wikidata
View/Edit Human	View/Edit Mouse

Myelin and lymphocyte protein is a protein that in humans is encoded by the MAL gene.

== Function ==
The protein encoded by this gene is a highly hydrophobic integral membrane protein belonging to the MAL family of proteolipids. The protein has been localized to the endoplasmic reticulum of T-cells and is a candidate linker protein in T-cell signal transduction. In addition, this proteolipid is localized in compact myelin of cells in the nervous system and has been implicated in myelin biogenesis and/or function. The protein plays a role in the formation, stabilization and maintenance of glycosphingolipid-enriched membrane microdomains. Alternative splicing produces four transcript variants which vary from each other by the presence or absence of alternatively spliced exons 2 and 3. The MAL protein is also thought to interact with the protein encoded by LSMEM1 based on two-hybrid screening.

== See also ==
- Anton blood group antigen
