= CD1E =

Protein-coding gene in humans

Identifiers
- Aliases: CD1E, CD1A, R2, CD1e molecule
- External IDs: OMIM: 188411; GeneCards: CD1E
Available structures
PDB	Human UniProt search: PDBe RCSB
PDB	List of PDB id codes 3S6C

Gene location (Human)
Chr.	Chromosome 1 (human)
Band	1q23.1	Start	158,353,696 bp
Band	1q23.1	End	158,357,553 bp
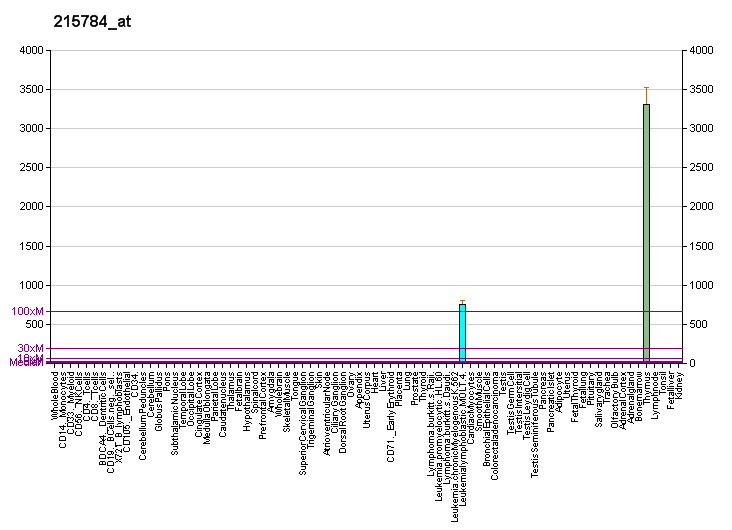

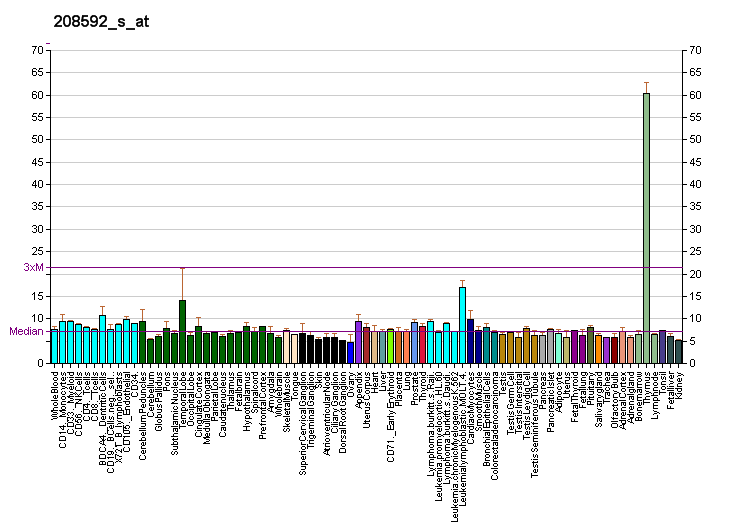
RNA expression pattern
Bgee	Human / Mouse (ortholog); Top expressed in: thymus; testicle; buccal mucosa cell; skin of thigh; gallbladder; granulocyte; skin of hip; monocyte; lymph node; rectum / n/a; More reference expression data
BioGPS	More reference expression data
Gene ontology
Molecular function	beta-2-microglobulin binding; endogenous lipid antigen binding; exogenous lipid antigen binding; lipopeptide binding; lipid binding
Cellular component	integral component of membrane; Golgi membrane; endosome; late endosome; plasma membrane; lysosome; integral component of plasma membrane; early endosome; lysosomal lumen; Golgi apparatus; membrane; cell surface; extracellular space; external side of plasma membrane
Biological process	antigen processing and presentation, exogenous lipid antigen via MHC class Ib; adaptive immune response; immune system process; immune response; positive regulation of T cell mediated cytotoxicity; antigen processing and presentation, endogenous lipid antigen via MHC class Ib
Sources:Amigo / QuickGO
Orthologs
Databases	NCBI: entry; OMA: entry
Species	Human	Mouse
Entrez	913	n/a
Ensembl	ENSG00000158488	n/a
UniProt	P15812	n/a
RefSeq (mRNA)	NM_001042583; NM_001042584; NM_001042585; NM_001042586; NM_001042587 NM_001185107; NM_001185108; NM_001185110; NM_001185112; NM_001185113; NM_001185114; NM_001185115; NM_030893	n/a
RefSeq (protein)	NP_001036048; NP_001036049; NP_001036050; NP_001036051; NP_001036052 NP_001172036; NP_001172037; NP_001172039; NP_001172041; NP_001172042; NP_001172043; NP_001172044; NP_112155	n/a
Location (UCSC)	Chr 1: 158.35 – 158.36 Mb	n/a
PubMed search		n/a
- Wikidata
View/Edit Human

T-cell surface glycoprotein CD1e, membrane-associated is a protein that in humans is encoded by the CD1E gene.

This gene encodes a member of the CD1 family of transmembrane glycoproteins, which are structurally related to the major histocompatibility complex (MHC) proteins and form heterodimers with beta-2-microglobulin. The CD1 proteins mediate the presentation of primarily lipid and glycolipid antigens of self or microbial origin to T cells. The human genome contains five CD1 family genes organized in a cluster on chromosome 1. The CD1 family members are thought to differ in their cellular localization and specificity for particular lipid ligands. The protein encoded by this gene localizes within Golgi compartments, endosomes, and lysosomes, and is cleaved into a stable soluble form. The soluble form is required for the intracellular processing of some glycolipids into a form that can be presented by other CD1 family members. Several alternatively spliced transcript variants encoding different isoforms have been described. Additional transcript variants have been found; however, their biological validity has not been determined.

== See also ==
- Cluster of differentiation
