= Glycolipid =

Class of chemical compounds

Glycolipid

Glycolipids (/ˈɡlaɪkoʊˌlɪpɪdz/) are lipids with a carbohydrate attached by a glycosidic (covalent) bond. Their role is to maintain the stability of the cell membrane and to facilitate cellular recognition, which is crucial to the immune response and in the connections that allow cells to connect to one another to form tissues. Glycolipids are found on the surface of all eukaryotic cell membranes, where they extend from the phospholipid bilayer into the extracellular environment.

== Structure ==
The essential feature of a glycolipid is the presence of a monosaccharide or oligosaccharide bound to a lipid moiety. The most common lipids in cellular membranes are glycerolipids and sphingolipids, which have glycerol or a sphingosine backbones, respectively. Fatty acids are connected to this backbone, so that the lipid as a whole has a polar head and a non-polar tail. The lipid bilayer of the cell membrane consists of two layers of lipids, with the inner and outer surfaces of the membrane made up of the polar head groups, and the inner part of the membrane made up of the non-polar fatty acid tails.

The saccharides that are attached to the polar head groups on the outside of the cell are the ligand components of glycolipids, and are likewise polar, allowing them to be soluble in the aqueous environment surrounding the cell. The lipid and the saccharide form a glycoconjugate through a glycosidic bond, which is a covalent bond. The anomeric carbon of the sugar binds to a free hydroxyl group on the lipid backbone. The structure of these saccharides varies depending on the structure of the molecules to which they bind.

== Metabolism ==
=== Glycosyltransferases ===
Enzymes called glycosyltransferases link the saccharide to the lipid molecule, and also play a role in assembling the correct oligosaccharide so that the right receptor can be activated on the cell which responds to the presence of the glycolipid on the surface of the cell. The glycolipid is assembled in the Golgi apparatus and embedded in the surface of a vesicle which is then transported to the cell membrane. The vesicle merges with the cell membrane so that the glycolipid can be presented on the cell's outside surface.

=== Glycoside hydrolases ===
Glycoside hydrolases catalyze the breakage of glycosidic bonds. They are used to modify the oligosaccharide structure of the glycan after it has been added onto the lipid. They can also remove glycans from glycolipids to turn them back into unmodified lipids.

=== Defects in metabolism ===
Sphingolipidoses are a group of diseases that are associated with the accumulation of sphingolipids which have not been degraded correctly, normally due to a defect in a glycoside hydrolase enzyme. Sphingolipidoses are typically inherited, and their effects depend on which enzyme is affected, and the degree of impairment. One notable example is Niemann–Pick disease which can cause pain and damage to neural networks.

== Function ==
=== Cell–cell interactions ===
The main function of glycolipids in the body is to serve as recognition sites for cell–cell interactions. The saccharide of the glycolipid will bind to a specific complementary carbohydrate or to a lectin (carbohydrate-binding protein), of a neighboring cell. The interaction of these cell surface markers is the basis of cell recognitions, and initiates cellular responses that contribute to activities such as regulation, growth, and apoptosis.

=== Immune responses ===
An example of how glycolipids function within the body is the interaction between leukocytes and endothelial cells during inflammation. Selectins, a class of lectins found on the surface of leukocytes and endothelial cells bind to the carbohydrates attached to glycolipids to initiate the immune response. This binding causes leukocytes to leave circulation and congregate near the site of inflammation. This is the initial binding mechanism, which is followed by the expression of integrins which form stronger bonds and allow leukocytes to migrate toward the site of inflammation. Glycolipids are also responsible for other responses, notably the recognition of host cells by viruses.

=== Blood types ===
Blood types are an example of how glycolipids on cell membranes mediate cell interactions with the surrounding environment. The four main human blood types (A, B, AB, O) are determined by the oligosaccharide attached to a specific glycolipid on the surface of red blood cells, which acts as an antigen. The unmodified antigen, called the H antigen, is the characteristic of type O, and is present on red blood cells of all blood types. Blood type A has an N-acetylgalactosamine added as the main determining structure, type B has a galactose, and type AB has all three of these antigens. Antigens which are not present in an individual's blood will cause antibodies to be produced, which will bind to the foreign glycolipids. For this reason, people with blood type AB can receive transfusions from all blood types (the universal acceptor), and people with blood type O can act as donors to all blood types (the universal donor).

Chemical structure of glycolipids

== Types of glycolipids ==
Some biologically important types of glycolipids include:

- Glycoglycerolipids: a sub-group of glycolipids characterized by an acetylated or non-acetylated glycerol with at least one fatty acid as the lipid complex. Glyceroglycolipids are often associated with photosynthetic membranes and their functions. The subcategories of glyceroglycolipids depend on the carbohydrate attached.
  - Galactolipids: defined by a galactose sugar attached to a glycerol lipid molecule. They are found in chloroplast membranes and are associated with photosynthetic properties.
  - Sulfolipids: have a sulfur-containing functional group in the sugar moiety attached to a lipid. An important group is the sulfoquinovosyl diacylglycerols which are associated with the sulfur cycle in plants.
- Glycosphingolipids: a sub-group of glycolipids based on sphingolipids. Glycosphingolipids are mostly located in nervous tissue and are responsible for cell signaling.
  - Cerebrosides: a group glycosphingolipids involved in nerve cell membranes.
    - Galactocerebrosides: a type of cerebroseide with galactose as the saccharide moiety
    - Glucocerebrosides: a type of cerebroside with glucose as the saccharide moiety; often found in non-neural tissue.
    - Sulfatides: a class of glycolipids containing a sulfate group in the carbohydrate with a ceramide lipid backbone. They are involved in numerous biological functions ranging from immune response to nervous system signaling.
  - Gangliosides: the most complex animal glycolipids. They contain negatively charged oligosacchrides with one or more sialic acid residues; more than 200 different gangliosides have been identified. They are most abundant in nerve cells.
  - Globosides: glycosphingolipids with more than one sugar as part of the carbohydrate complex. They have a variety of functions; failure to degrade these molecules leads to Fabry disease.
  - Glycophosphosphingolipids: complex glycophospholipids from fungi, yeasts, and plants, where they were originally called "phytoglycolipids". They may be as complicated a set of compounds as the negatively charged gangliosides in animals.
- Glycophosphatidylinositols: a sub-group of glycolipids defined by a phosphatidylinositol lipid moiety bound to a carbohydrate complex. They can be bound to the C-terminus of a protein and have various functions associated with the different proteins they can be bound to.

== See also ==
- Sophorolipid
- Rhamnolipid
- Glycocalyx
- Glycome
- Glycoprotein
- Niemann–Pick disease
