= KLRB1 =

Protein-coding gene in humans

Identifiers
- Aliases: KLRB1, CD161, CLEC5B, NKR, NKR-P1, NKR-P1A, NKRP1A, hNKR-P1A, killer cell lectin like receptor B1
- External IDs: OMIM: 602890; MGI: 107540; GeneCards: KLRB1

Gene location (Human)
Chr.	Chromosome 12 (human)
Band	12p13.31	Start	9,594,551 bp
Band	12p13.31	End	9,607,916 bp

Gene location (Mouse)
Chr.	Chromosome 6 (mouse)
Band	6 F3|6 63.06 cM	Start	128,586,190 bp
Band	6 F3|6 63.06 cM	End	128,600,496 bp
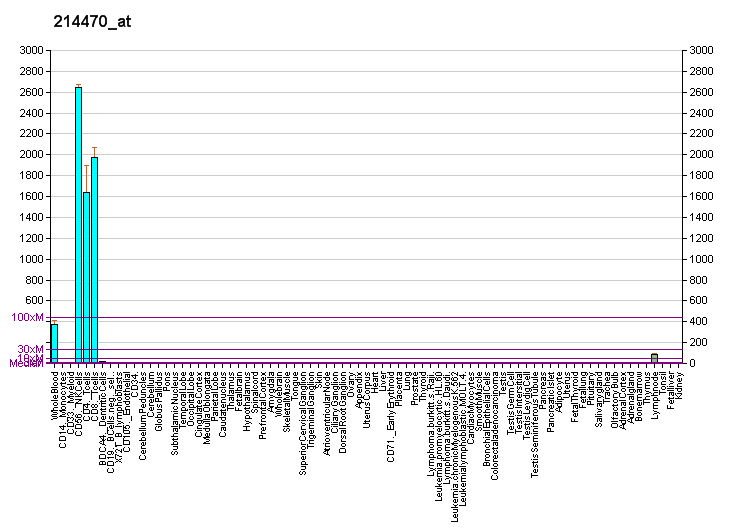
RNA expression pattern
Bgee	Human / Mouse (ortholog); Top expressed in: granulocyte; mucosa of ileum; jejunal mucosa; blood; spleen; appendix; lymph node; amniotic fluid; bone marrow; epithelium of colon / Top expressed in: morula; embryo; sciatic nerve; blood; spleen; jejunum; blastocyst; thymus; utricle; white adipose tissue; More reference expression data
BioGPS	More reference expression data
Gene ontology
Molecular function	transmembrane signaling receptor activity; carbohydrate binding; protein binding
Cellular component	integral component of membrane; plasma membrane; membrane
Biological process	cell surface receptor signaling pathway; regulation of immune response
Sources:Amigo / QuickGO
Orthologs
Databases	NCBI: entry; OMA: entry
Species	Human	Mouse
Entrez	3820	17057
Ensembl	ENSG00000111796	ENSMUSG00000030361
UniProt	Q12918	P27811
RefSeq (mRNA)	NM_002258	NM_001159902; NM_010737
RefSeq (protein)	NP_002249	NP_001153374; NP_034867
Location (UCSC)	Chr 12: 9.59 – 9.61 Mb	Chr 6: 128.59 – 128.6 Mb
PubMed search
- Wikidata
View/Edit Human	View/Edit Mouse

Killer cell lectin-like receptor subfamily B, member 1, also known as KLRB1, NKR-P1A or CD161 (cluster of differentiation 161), is a human gene.

== Function ==
Natural killer (NK) cells are lymphocytes that mediate cytotoxicity and secrete cytokines after immune stimulation. Several genes of the C-type lectin superfamily, including the rodent NKRP1 family of glycoproteins, are expressed by NK cells and may be involved in the regulation of NK cell function. The KLRB1 protein contains an extracellular domain with several motifs characteristic of C-type lectins, a transmembrane domain, and a cytoplasmic domain. The KLRB1 protein, NKR-P1A or CD161, is classified as a type II membrane protein because it has an external C terminus. NKR-P1A, the receptor encoded by the KLRB1 gene, recognizes Lectin Like Transcript-1 (LLT1) as a functional ligand. Its engagement by NKR-P1 leads to clustering of the latter on the NK cell surface mediating an inhibitory signalling.
