= CASPR =

Protein found in humans

CNTNAP1

Identifiers
- Aliases: CNTNAP1, CASPR, CNTNAP, NRXN4, P190, contactin associated protein 1, CHN3
- External IDs: OMIM: 602346; MGI: 1858201; HomoloGene: 2693; GeneCards: CNTNAP1; OMA:CNTNAP1 - orthologs

Gene location (Human)
Chr.	Chromosome 17 (human)
Band	17q21.2	Start	42,682,531 bp
Band	17q21.2	End	42,699,993 bp

Gene location (Mouse)
Chr.	Chromosome 11 (mouse)
Band	11|11 D	Start	101,061,349 bp
Band	11|11 D	End	101,081,550 bp
RNA expression pattern
Bgee	Human / Mouse (ortholog); Top expressed in: right hemisphere of cerebellum; Region I of hippocampus proper; postcentral gyrus; right frontal lobe; Brodmann area 46; superior frontal gyrus; orbitofrontal cortex; lateral nuclear group of thalamus; prefrontal cortex; Brodmann area 9 / Top expressed in: superior frontal gyrus; dentate gyrus of hippocampal formation granule cell; primary visual cortex; cerebellar cortex; neural layer of retina; zygote; lumbar subsegment of spinal cord; perirhinal cortex; secondary oocyte; entorhinal cortex; More reference expression data
BioGPS	n/a
Gene ontology
Molecular function	SH3 domain binding; protein binding; signaling receptor activity
Cellular component	integral component of membrane; membrane; myelin sheath; voltage-gated potassium channel complex; integral component of plasma membrane; axon; paranode region of axon; cell junction; paranodal junction; presynaptic active zone membrane
Biological process	neuromuscular process controlling posture; neuromuscular process controlling balance; protein localization to paranode region of axon; cell adhesion; cytoskeleton organization; neuronal action potential propagation; neuron projection development; signal transduction; positive regulation of signal transduction; central nervous system myelination; myelination in peripheral nervous system; paranodal junction assembly; neuron projection morphogenesis; protein localization to juxtaparanode region of axon
Sources:Amigo / QuickGO
Orthologs
Species	Human	Mouse
Entrez	8506	53321
Ensembl	ENSG00000108797	ENSMUSG00000017167
UniProt	P78357	O54991
RefSeq (mRNA)	NM_003632	NM_016782
RefSeq (protein)	NP_003623	NP_058062
Location (UCSC)	Chr 17: 42.68 – 42.7 Mb	Chr 11: 101.06 – 101.08 Mb
PubMed search
- Wikidata
View/Edit Human	View/Edit Mouse

CASPR also known as Contactin associated protein 1, Paranodin and CASPR1 is a protein that in humans is encoded by the CNTNAP1 gene. CASPR is a part of the neurexin family of proteins, hence its another name "Neurexin IV". CASPR is a membrane protein found in the neuronal membrane in the paranodal section of the axon[[]] in myelinated neurons, between the Nodes of Ranvier containing Na+ channels, and juxtaparanode, which contains K+ channels. During myelination, caspr associates with contactin in a cis complex, though its precise role in myelination is not yet understood.

== Function ==
The gene product was initially identified as a 190-kD protein associated with the contactin-PTPRZ1 complex. The 1,384-amino acid protein, also designated p190 or CASPR for 'contactin-associated protein,' includes an extracellular domain with several putative protein-protein interaction domains, a putative transmembrane domain, and a 74-amino acid cytoplasmic domain. Northern blot analysis showed that the gene is transcribed predominantly in brain as a transcript of 6.2 kb, with weak expression in several other tissues tested. The architecture of its extracellular domain is similar to that of neurexins, and this protein may be the signaling subunit of contactin, enabling recruitment and activation of intracellular signaling pathways in neurons. [provided by RefSeq, Jan 2009].

== Clinical ==
Mutations in CNTNAP1 cause arthrogryposis multiplex congenita.

Other diseases associated with mutations in this gene include lethal congenital contracture syndrome type 7 and congenital hypomyelinating neuropathy type 3.
