= Sulfolipid =

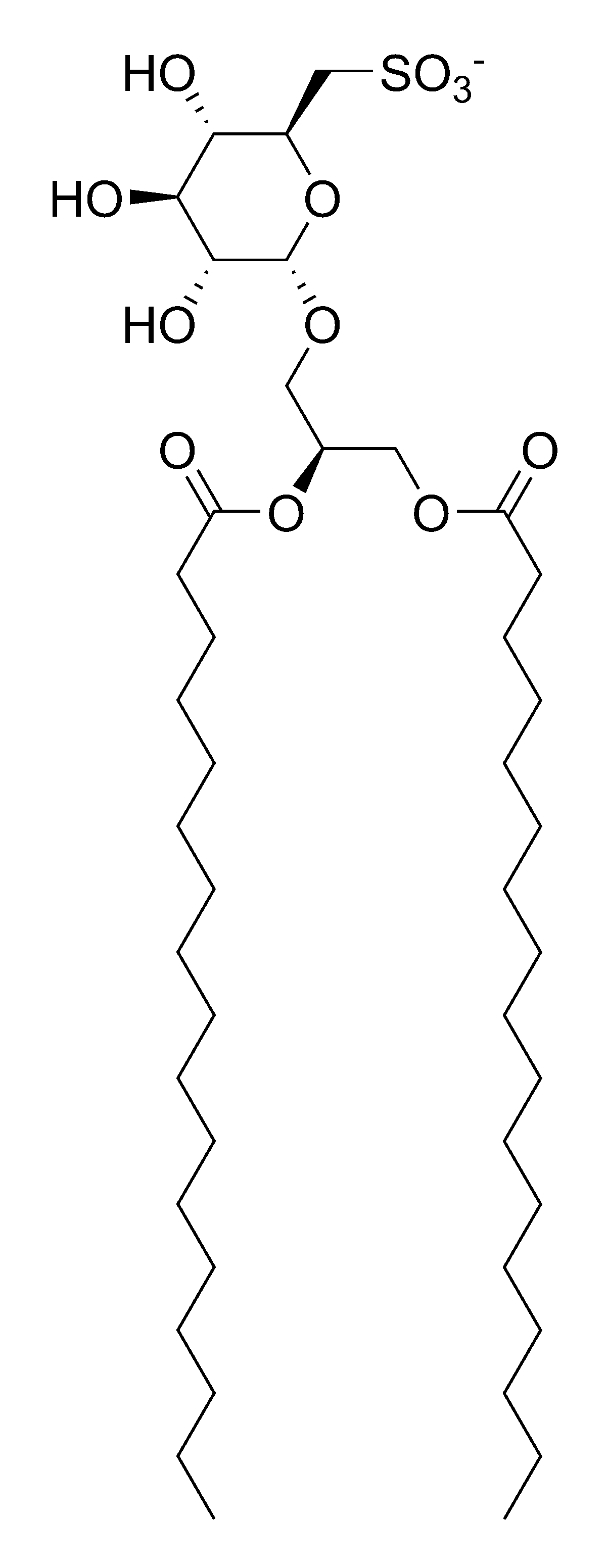
Chemical structure of sulfoquinovosyl distearoylglycerol, a type of sulfoquinovosyl diacylglycerol

Sulfolipids are a class of lipids which possess a sulfur-containing functional group. An abundant sulfolipid is sulfoquinovosyl diacylglycerol, which is composed of a glycoside of sulfoquinovose and diacylglycerol. In plants, sulfoquinovosyl diacylglycerides (SQDG) are important members of the sulfur cycle. Other important sulfolipids include sulfatide and seminolipid, each of which are sulfated glycolipids. Sulfolipids have been implicated in the functions of two of the core components of the photosynthetic electron transport chain and while not necessarily essential, might have a protective function when the photosynthetic apparatus is under stress.

== See also ==
- Sulfatide
- Galactolipid
- Phospholipid
- Glycolipid
