= Ethnic cleansing in Kosovo =

Ethnic cleansing in Kosovo may refer to numerous different events, listed in reverse chronological order:

- War crimes in the Kosovo War, the ethnic cleansing campaigns, namely that of Albanian civilians by Yugoslavia, but also Serb and non-Albanian civilians by Albanian extremists that took place in the Kosovo War in the 1990s
- Kosovo during World War II, the deportation and killings of mostly Serbs and Montenegrins by Albanian fascists in Kosovo during WWII
- Yugoslav colonization of Kosovo, Serbia, Montenegro, and Yugoslavia's program to alter the ethnic composition of Kosovo through killings and forced displacement of Kosovar Albanians at various periods throughout the 20th century
- Massacres of Albanians in World War I, the killings and forced displacements of Albanian and Kosovo Albanian civilians by Serbia and Montenegro, Greek, and Bulgarian forces
- Massacres of Albanians in the Balkan Wars, the massacres and expulsions of Albanians by the Kingdoms of Serbia and Montenegro from 1912 to 1913
- Violence against Serbs during the late Ottoman era, violence and killings against Serbs, often in Kosovo, in the Ottoman Empire
