= Blanche Alethea Crackanthorpe =

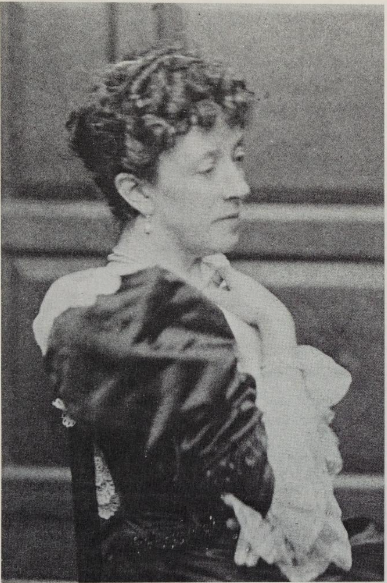
- Born: 1847
- Died: 4 June 1928 (aged 80–81)
- Spouse(s): Montague Hughes Crackanthorpe
- Children: Hubert Crackanthorpe, Dayrell Crackanthorpe, Oliver Montague Crackenthorpe
- Parent(s): Eardley Chauncy Holt

Blanche Alethea Elizabeth Holt Crackanthorpe (1847 – 4 June 1928) was a British feminist author and journalist, best known for her essay "The Revolt of the Daughters."

Blanche Alethea Elizabeth Holt was the daughter of the Rev. Eardley Chauncy Holt of East Sheen, Surrey. In 1869, she married Montague Hughes Cookson, a barrister and eugenicist. In 1888, the family changed their name to Crackanthorpe after Montague Cookson inherited the landed estate of his cousin, William Crackanthorpe. They would have three children: author Hubert Montague Crackanthorpe (1870–1896), diplomat Dayrell Eardley Montague Crackanthorpe (1871–1950), and army officer Oliver Montague Crackanthorpe (1876–1934).

Crackanthorpe wrote about literature and women's issues for periodicals including The Woman's World, The Fortnightly Review, and The Contemporary Review. Her most famous essay, "The Revolt of the Daughters," appeared in The Nineteenth Century in January 1894, sparking a debate about the New Woman and a number of response essays, pro and con. Crackanthorpe advocated for the independence of women, her right to be considered "as an individual", the ability to travel freely and avoid marriage and children, and for their professional education. She published another controversial essay, "Sex in Modern Literature," the following year, where she advocated on behalf of the work of authors George Moore and Thomas Hardy.

Her short play Other People's Shoes was published in the anthology Dialogues for the Day (1895). Her play The Turn of the Wheel (1901) was banned by the Lord Chamberlain's Office, likely because of its then-shocking views of motherhood. The protagonist Isabel Broadwood has a child out of wedlock and has no wish to be a mother to the child. Her novel Milly's Story: The New Moon (1895) is a parody of The New Moon (1895) by Elizabeth Robins.

At their home on Rutland Gate in Knightsbridge, Crackanthorpe hosted frequent literary soirees and befriended authors including Hardy, Henry James, and George Meredith.

Blanche Alethea Crackanthorpe died on 4 June 1928.

== Bibliography ==
- Milly's Story: The New Moon. London, William Heinemann, 1895.
