= Crvivci =

Village in Southwestern Region, North Macedonia

Crvivci Црвивци Cërvicë
- Village
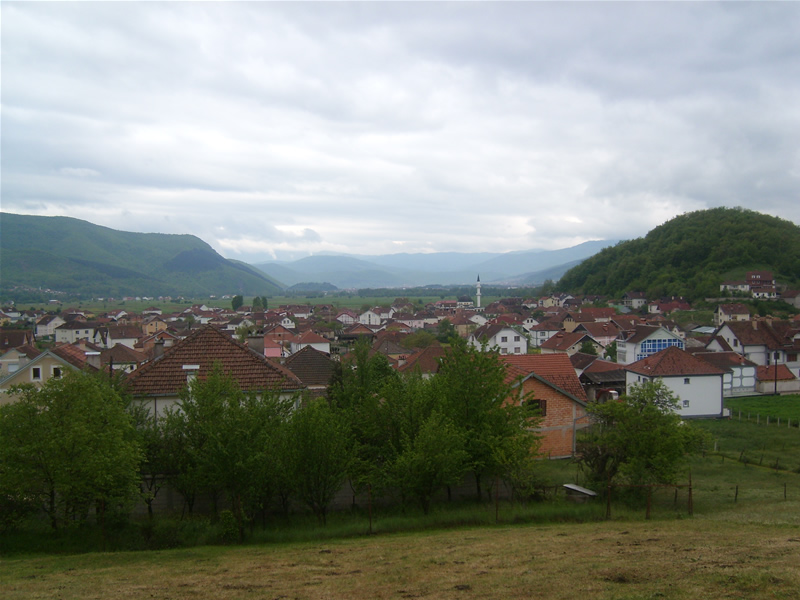

- Location within North Macedonia
- Coordinates: 41°33′32″N 20°59′08″E
- Country: North Macedonia
- Region: Southwestern
- Municipality: Kičevo

Population (2021)
  - Total: 705
- Time zone: UTC+1 (CET)
  - Summer (DST): UTC+2 (CEST)
- Car plates: KI
- Website: .

Crvivci (Macedonian: Црвивци, Albanian: Cërvicë) is a village in the municipality of Kičevo, North Macedonia. It used to be part of the former municipality of Oslomej.

== History ==
During the period of 1912–1913, members of the Serbian army massacred a total of 36 Albanian men from the village. The bodies were buried in mass graves.

== Demographics ==
As of the 2021 census, Crvivci had 705 residents with the following ethnic composition:

- Albanians 671
- Persons for whom data are taken from administrative sources 34

According to the 2002 census, the village had a total of 1,725 inhabitants. Ethnic groups in the village include:

- Albanians 1,702
- Macedonians 3
- Bosniaks 1
- Others 19

According to the 1942 Albanian census, Crvivci was inhabited by a total of 722 Muslim Albanians.

The village is attested in the 1467/68 Ottoman tax registry (defter) for the Nahiyah of Kırçova. The village had a total of 48 houses, excluding bachelors (mucerred).
