= Dayrell Crackanthorpe =

British diplomat (1871 – 1950)

Dayrell Eardley Montague Crackanthorpe, CMG (1871 – 1950) was a British diplomat.

His father was Montague Hughes Cookson (1832-1913), a barrister who took the name Crackanthorpe upon inheriting Newbiggin Hall. His mother was Blanche Alethea Crackanthorpe (1847-1928), writer and women's suffragist.

In October 1898, he married Edna (or Ida) Sickles (1875-1918), the daughter of General Daniel Sickles and his second wife Carmina.They had three children together:

Francis Dayrell Montague Crackanthorpe (1900-1944)

George Christopher Crackanthorpe (1901-1931)

Ida Blanche Crackanthorpe (1903 -?)

In 1914, Crackanthorpe was in charge of the British legation at Belgrade at the time of the assassination of Archduke Franz Ferdinand.

He was British Minister to the Central American Republics from 1919 to 1922, but did not proceed to post.

He was the brother of the writer Hubert Crackanthorpe.
