= Massacres of Albanians in the Balkan Wars =

Killings of Albanians during the Balkan Wars of 1912–1913

- Part of the Balkan Wars and the Yugoslav colonization of Kosovo
- Albanian civilians taken prisoner in Pristina during massacres by the Serbian army in 1912

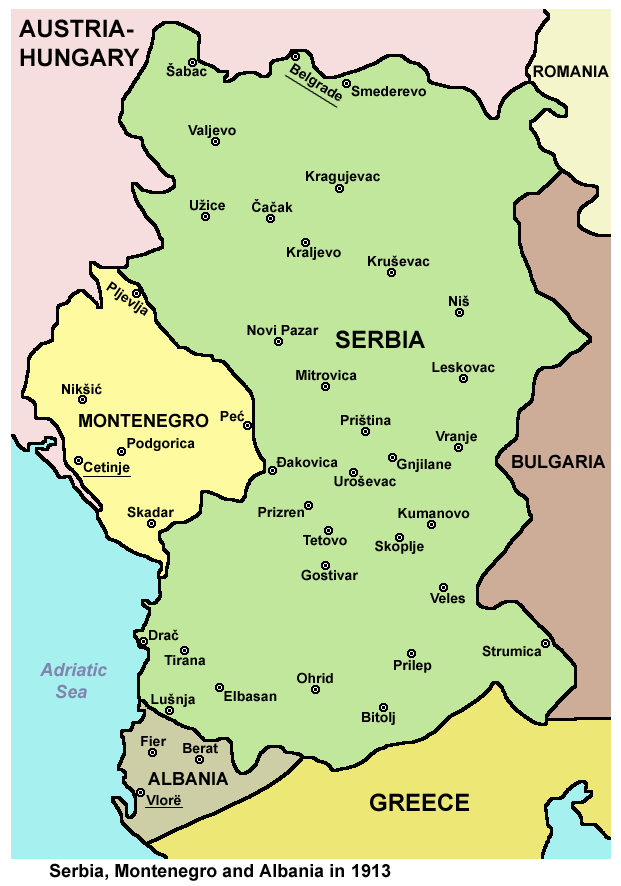
- Situation in the western Balkans after the Ottoman defeat in the First Balkan War
- Location: Scutari Vilayet, Kosovo Vilayet, Manastir Vilayet, Janina Vilayet
- Date: October 1912–1913
- Target: Albanians
- Attack type: Extermination, ethnic cleansing, genocidal massacres, mutilation, forced conversions, death marches, concentration camps, others
- Deaths: c. 120,000+: Kosovo: at least 50,000; Albania: up to 100,000 Muslims; (see details)
- Victims: Ethnic cleansing: 60,000–281,747 Albanians above the age of six expelled from Sandžak, Kosovo and Macedonia by 1914
- Perpetrators: Kingdom of Serbia, Kingdom of Montenegro, Chetniks, Greek paramilitaries
- Motive: Albanophobia, Greater Serbia, Islamophobia, Anti-Catholicism

Massacres of Albanians in the Balkan Wars were perpetrated on several occasions by the Serbian and Montenegrin armies and paramilitaries between 1912 and 1913. During the this period, Serbia and Montenegro committed a number of war crimes against the Albanian population after expelling Ottoman Empire forces from present-day Albania, Kosovo, and North Macedonia, which were reported by the European, American and Serbian opposition press. The goal of the forced expulsions and massacres was statistical manipulation before the London Ambassadors Conference to determine the new Balkan borders.

According to contemporary accounts, around 20,000 to 25,000 Albanians were killed in the Kosovo Vilayet during the first two to four months, before the violence climaxed. The total number of Albanians that were killed in during the Balkan Wars is generally estimated to be at least 120,000. Most of the victims were children, women and the elderly. Villages were burned to ashes and Albanian Muslims forced to flee when Serbo-Montenegrin forces invaded Kosovo in 1912. Some chronicles cited decapitation as well as mutilation. According to documents from the Serbian Ministry of Foreign Affairs, 239,807 Albanians were expelled from Old Serbia between 1912 and early 1914 (not counting children under the age of six); by late 1914, this number increased to 281,747. These figures, however, are controversial and scholarly estimates can be as low as 60,000.

According to Philip J. Cohen, the Serbian Army generated so much fear that some Albanian women killed their children rather than let them fall into the hands of Serbian soldiers. The Carnegie Commission, an international fact-finding mission, concluded that the Serbian and Montenegrin armies perpetrated large-scale violence for "the entire transformation of the ethnic character of regions inhabited exclusively by Albanians". Cohen, examining the Carnegie Endowment for International Peace report, said that Serbian soldiers cut off the ears, noses and tongues of Albanian civilians and gouged out their eyes. Cohen also cited Edith Durham as saying that Serbian soldiers helped bury people alive in Kosovo.

Some scholars and contemporary sources offer the view that either elements of the atrocities, like during the Battle of Lumë, or the entire campaign constituted genocide or an effort to systematically exterminate the Albanian population in various regions. Further massacres against Albanians occurred during the First World War and continued during the interwar period.

== Background ==
The Albanian-Serbian conflict has its roots in the expulsion of the Albanians in 1877-1878 from areas which were incorporated into the Principality of Serbia. As a result, some Albanian refugees who fled to Kosovo attacked the local Serb population. In May 1901, Albanians pillaged and partially burned the cities of Novi Pazar, Sjenica and Pristina, and massacred Serbs in the area of North Kosovo. Before the outbreak of the First Balkan War, the Albanians were fighting for a nation state. A mid-1912 Albanian revolt resulted in Ottoman recognition of the "14 Points", a list of demands which included the establishment of an Albanian Vilayet. The push for Albanian autonomy and Ottoman weakness were seen by contemporary regional Christian Balkan powers as threatening their Christian population with extermination. According to Albanian scholarship, the realisation of Albanian aspirations was received negatively by Bulgaria, Serbia, Montenegro and Greece. The Balkan League (Serbia, Montenegro, Greece and Bulgaria) attacked the Ottoman Empire and, during the next few months, partitioned all Ottoman territory inhabited by Albanians. The kingdoms of Serbia and Greece occupied most of present-day Albania and other Albanian-inhabited lands on the Adriatic coast. Montenegro occupied a portion of present-day northern Albania, around Shkodër. According to Dimitrije Tucović, Serbia doubled its territory. Most Albanian historians say that Montenegro, Greece and Serbia did not recognise Albanian autonomy, and the Balkan Wars were fought to stop it on Ottoman lands they claimed.

When the Serbo-Montenegrin forces invaded the Vilayet of Kosovo in 1912, much of the Albanian population fled due to the feared (and actual) violence they experienced at the hands of the invading armies. The Serb military effort to conquer Kosovo had overtones of extermination due to Serb retaliation against Albanians affecting children and women, including the killing of women and men and the destruction of homes. During this period, 235 villages were burned down: 133 by Serb forces and 102 by the Montenegrins. Steven Schwarts writes that during the capture of Durrës, Shkodër and Shengjin, Serbian soldiers massacred and pillaged poor Albanians. According to the Albanian Armend Bekaj, the Serbian invasion of Kosovo was illegal. Anna Di Lellio writes that the Serbian expansion campaign forced Albanians to accept a Serb nationalist ideology which made them feel like a minority in their homeland.

According to a telegram sent from the Serbian consul in Prishtina, dated 22 September 1912, the Albanians were scared of the potential Serbian invasion. Nikola Pašić then ordered that Milan Rakić and Jovan M. Jovanović write a proclamation declaring that "the Serbian army would not act against Albanians but Turkey, and that the army would free the Serbs. The Albanians would not be harmed, and schools and places of worship would be left alone, and that there would be freedom of language." Belgrade had promised Isa Boletini to act friendly towards the Albanian uprising against the Turks and that the Albanians and Serbs would live in peace. Although the Kingdom of Serbia signed the Hague Conventions of 1899 and 1907, it did not follow the 1907 treaty; Muslim civilians in Kosovo were ill-treated and subject to excessive violence.

== Vilayet of Scutari ==
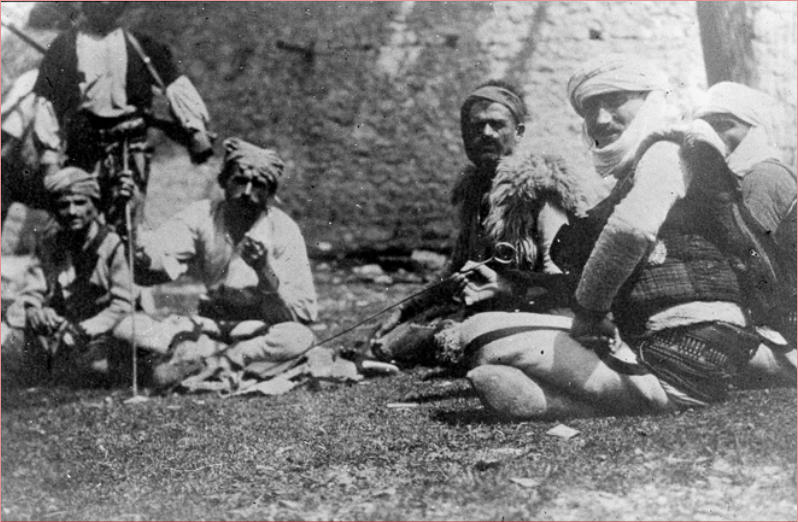
Albanian refugees from Vusanje in 1913

A number of reports surfaced about violent Montenegrin persecutions of Catholic Albanians. In Montenegrin-controlled districts, Catholic and Muslim Albanians were subject to forced mass conversions to Orthodox Christianity. When Serbo-Montenegrin soldiers invaded Shkodër, about 10,000 Montenegrins soldiers died. Equating Albanians with Turks, Serbian army enacted a revenge on the population for the way they had been treated centuries prior by Turks. The city was looted, and civilians (including the sick and wounded and women and children, many of whom were Christian) were massacred. In late 1913, international pressure resulted in the withdrawal of Serbian forces from Shkodër; according to the city's Austro-Hungarian consul, Serb troops killed about 600 Albanians.

In 1912, Serbian troops entered the village of Zalla in Krujë and one soldier broke into a house and assaulted a woman. The husband shot the soldier, and when the Serbian troops arrived they massacred everyone, including women and children and razed the village. After the Battle of Brdica, Serbian soldiers retreated into the village of Barbullush and, despite the residents' pleas for mercy, massacred men, women, children, and elderly.

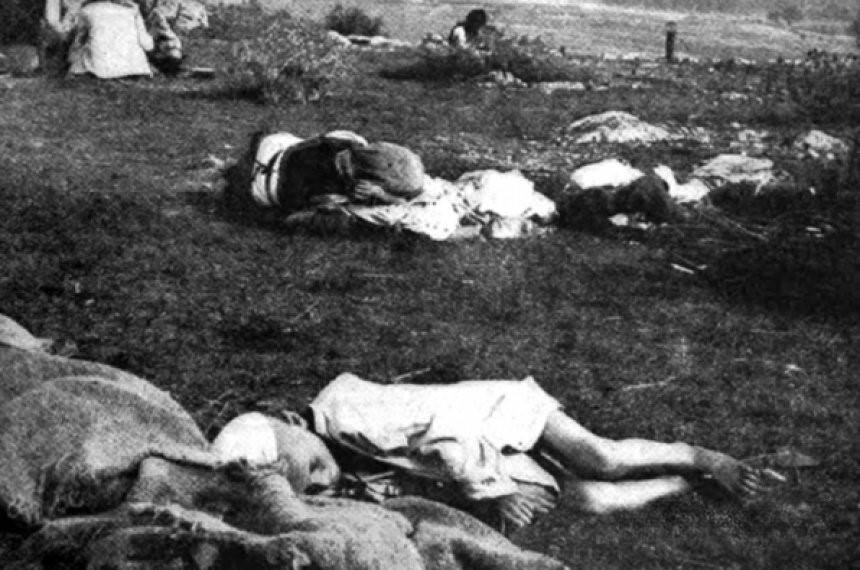
Albanians dying of starvation as a result of constant plundering by the Serbian army

A British captain who was aiding a general spoke with incoming Albanian refugees and reported, "The Serbs are also in the region of Krasniqe, and they massacred all those who stayed behind. Refugees tell of wild and pitiful scenes".

In Tirana, many Albanians were beaten to death by local Serbian troops. After aiding Albanian volunteers, residents of Kaza Tirana had their houses burnt down and 17 people burned to death and an additional 12 were executed. In 1913, Serbian troops entered Albanian inhabited villages and bayonetted 27 unarmed men from the village of Gjuzaj when they resisted the occupation. Serbian troops also committed several atrocities in the village of Kadiaj in Fier.

== Vilayet of Kosovo ==
Albanians being executed during the Gjilan massacre

The Austro-Hungarian consulate in Belgrade reported that during February 1913, Serbian military forces executed all Albanian inhabitants of the villages of Kabash, Tërpezë, Lubisht and Gjylekar. Chetniks razed the Albanian quarter of Skopje and killed a number of the city's Albanian inhabitants. Numerous reports from the Balkan Wars including the series of articles from then journalist Leon Trotsky recorded state-organized massacres in numerous locations including Ferizaj, Gjakova, Gjilan, Pristina and Prizren with the total number of deaths at around 25,000 by early 1913.

In 2001, a report was published with a list of 431 civilians who had been killed by Serbo-Montenegrin troops in Kosovo in 1912–13. Names, dates and locations were documented. The villages included Istog, Deçan, Klina, Dragash and Preševo, among many others mentioned below.

=== Pristina ===
The Serbian army entered Pristina on 22 October. Serbian settlers were brought into the city, and Serbian Prime Minister Nikola Pašić bought 1,214 acres (491 ha) of land. Albanian and Turkish households were looted and destroyed, and women and children were killed. A Danish journalist based in Skopje reported that the Serbian campaign in Pristina "had taken on the character of a horrific massacring of the Albanian population", with the claim of 5,000 people killed after the Serbian takeover. The events have been interpreted as an early attempt to change the region's demographics.

Albanian Catholic archbishop of Skopje, Lazër Mjeda, wrote a report dated 24 January 1913 to the Vatican on the Serbian invasion of Kosovo and Macedonia, which included the claim that in October 1912 the Albanians in Pristina (led by Ottoman and Ottoman Albanian officers) abused the white flag, and attacked and killed all the Serbian soldiers, and that the Serbian army used this as an excuse for the brutal retaliation against civilians.

=== Gjakova ===
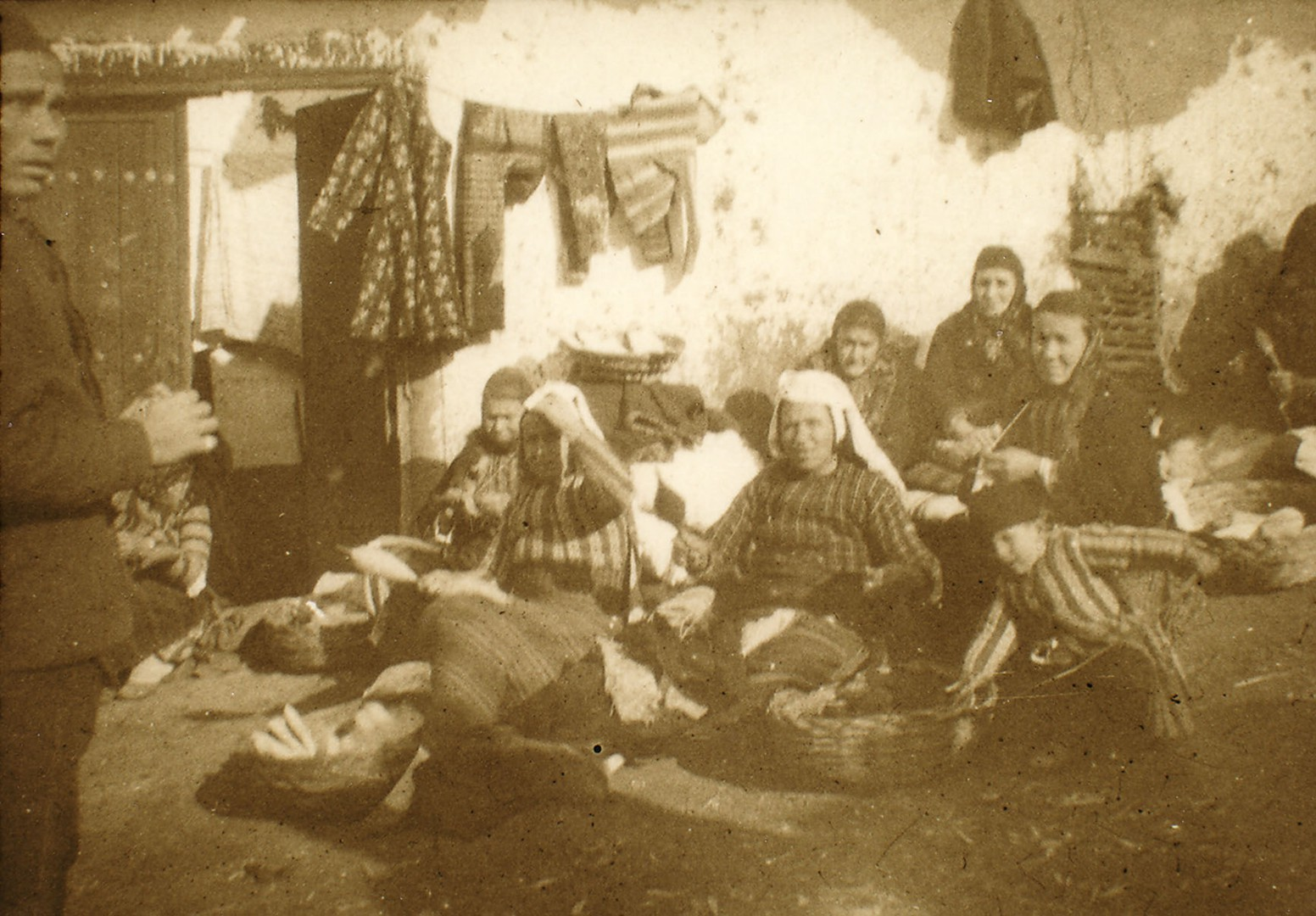
Albanian women from Gjakova fleeing from the Serbian army in 1913

The Vasojevići Brigade under Radomir Vešović conquered Metohija with Gjakova. The regional Montenegrin paramilitary called Krilaši abused the Albanian population. There was a news piece dubbed "Servian Army left a trail of blood" in the New York Times, dated 31 December 1912, quoting "A Budapest dispatch to The Daily Chronicle ... gathered for the Austro-Hungarian authorities", that Gjakova became a "gallows alley", with people hanged on both sides of the road.

Austro-Hungarian diplomat Albert von Mensdorff-Pouilly-Dietrichstein told Edward Grey in a 10 March 1913 interview that Serbian soldiers behaved in a "barbarous way" toward Muslim and Catholic Albanians in Gjakova.

Montenegrin authorities in Metohija in 1913 turned voluntary conversion to Orthodoxy into forcible conversion (by Serbian Orthodox priests), which also the Serbian government complained about, leading the Montenegrin government in May 1913 to abandon this policy.

In September 1913, Gjakova was the site of a sudden attack by Albanians, part of a well-organized attack by 10–12,000 Albanians on the demarcation line Gjakova–Prizren–Debar against Serbian and Montenegrin forces numbering 3,000. Austro-Hungarian media instead blamed the Serbian maltreatment of new subjects that provoked the uprising.

The Albanische Korrespondenz (of Leo Freundlich) published a report on 16 September 1913 of Austro-Hungarian Vice-Consul Kohlruss, that "village (Fshaj) and two others were destroyed and thirty-five Albanians burnt to death", after which Malesori tribesmen took up arms, however, this was in fact part of the well-organized Albanian attack in the demarcation line after Serbian demobilization and the Treaty of Bucharest (August 1913). According to Robert Elsie (2015), Serbian forces burnt down 2,000 houses and killed 51 men in Bytyçi during the October 1913 invasion of the Gjakova Highlands. Leo Freundlich claimed in Albania's Golgotha that the village of Bobaj was torched and all of the locals were killed after four Serbian soldiers were beaten for trying to rape the women, some time in 1913.

=== Prizren ===
When the Serbian army controlled the city of Prizren, it imposed repressive measures against the Albanian civil population; Serbian detachments broke into houses, plundered, committed acts of violence, and killed indiscriminately. About 400 people were "eradicated" during the first days of Serbian occupation. According to a witness, about 1,500 Albanian bodies lay in the streets, and foreign reporters were barred from the city. General Božidar Janković forced the city's surviving Albanian leaders to sign a statement expressing gratitude to Serbian King Peter I Karađorđević for their liberation. An estimated 2,000 Albanians were killed in and around Prizren by 1913, which rose to 5,000 in January. British traveller Edith Durham and a British military attaché were supposed to visit Prizren in October 1912, but the trip was cancelled by the authorities. Durham said, "I asked wounded Montengrins [soldiers] why I was not allowed to go and they laughed and said 'We have not left a nose on an Albanian up there!' Not a pretty sight for a British officer." Durham eventually visited a northern Albanian outpost in Kosovo, where she met captured Ottoman soldiers whose upper lips and noses had been cut off.

Although Prizren offered no resistance to Serb forces, it did not avert a bloodbath; Prizren was the second-hardest-hit Albanian city, after Pristina. Serb forces invaded homes and abused anyone in their way, and up to 400 people died in the first few days of the Serbian occupation. When the Serbian troops set off westwards, they could not find horses to transport their equipment and used 200 Albanians; most collapsed along the way.

=== Plav–Gusinje ===
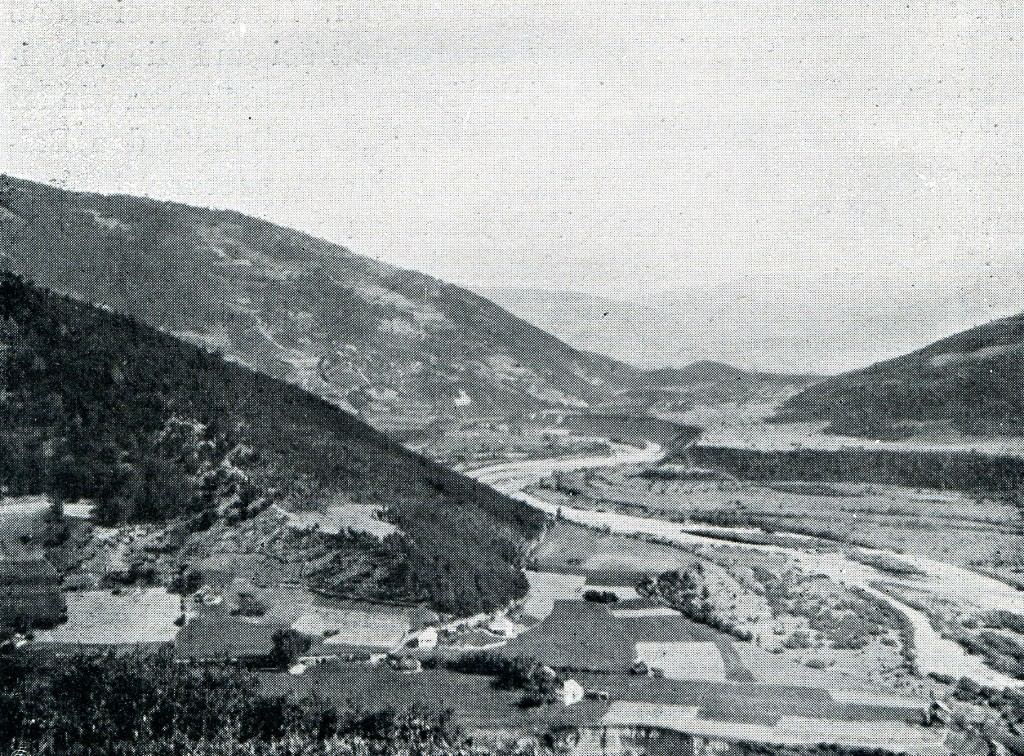
Photograph of Plav in 1912

Bosniak organizations claim that more than 1,800 Muslims were massacred and 12,000 forced to convert to Serbian Orthodoxy in Plav-Gusinje during the Balkan Wars. Mark Krasniqi from the Academy of Sciences of Kosovo claimed that a total of 8,000 Albanians were killed in the Plav–Gusinje massacres. In 1913, Serbian troops massacred 620 unarmed men and boys in the village of Topojan.

=== Rugova ===
In 1913, General Janko Vukotić told Edith Durham that his soldiers had committed atrocities against the civilian population of Rugova. In response to her protests, he reportedly said: "But they are beasts, savage animals. We have done very well". Slovene author Božidar Jezernik interprets this as attesting the Montenegrin goal of removing local Muslims from their newly captured territories and resettling them.

=== Ferizaj ===
The capture of Ferizaj by the Serbian army and the subsequent events were documented in contemporary accounts. The entry of the Serbian army was followed by a massacre of the population. Leo Freundlich recorded contemporary reports in Albania's Golgotha. According to the war correspondent from Rome's Il Messaggero, the town was destroyed and most of its inhabitants were killed. A Catholic priest in the region reported that resistance was strong for three days against the advancing Serbian army. When the town was finally taken, local residents who were fleeing were invited back if they surrendered their weapons. After they did, the army killed 300 to 400 people; only a few Muslim families remained. Freundlich estimated the total number of deaths at 1,200 on October 24, 1912.

Another source of first-hand accounts in the region was Leon Trotsky, who was a war correspondent for the Kiev newspaper Kievskaya Misl. His reports from Ferizaj describe the killings and looting which occurred after its capture by the Serbian army.

=== Luma ===
Luma region

Serb military forces entered Luma in 1912 and attacked local inhabitants, killed tribal chieftains, seized cattle and razed villages. This triggered a local uprising. Serb forces retaliated with a scorched-earth policy and widespread killing; young and old, men and women were barricaded in mosques and houses and shot or burned. Twenty-five thousand people fled to Kosovo and western Macedonia. According to Mark Levene, the events were a "localized genocide".

When General Božidar Janković saw that the region's Albanians would not allow Serbian forces to continue advancing to the Adriatic Sea, he ordered his troops to continue their brutality. The Serbian army killed men, women and children and destroyed 27 villages in the Luma region. Reports cited Serbian army atrocities, including the burning of women and children tied to haystacks in front of their husbands and fathers. about 400 men from Luma surrendered to Serbian authorities, and were brought to Prizren and killed. According to a Daily Telegraph story, "All the horrors of history have been outdone by the atrocious conduct of the troops of General Jankovic".

The second Luma massacre occurred the following year. After the Conference of the Ambassadors decided that Luma should be part of Albania, the Serbian army initially refused to withdraw. The Albanians rebelled in September 1913, and Luma again experienced harsh retaliation from the Serbian army. A report of the International Commission cited a letter from a Serbian soldier who described the punitive expedition against the rebel Albanians:

My dear Friend, I have no time to write to you at length, but I can tell you that appalling things are going on here. I am terrified by them, and constantly ask myself how men can be so barbarous as to commit such cruelties. It is horrible. I dare not tell you more, but I may say that Luma (an Albanian region along the river of the same name), no longer exists. There is nothing but corpses, dust and ashes. There are villages of 100, 150, 200 houses, where there is no longer a single man, literally not one. We collect them in bodies of forty to fifty, and then we pierce them with our bayonets to the last man. Pillage is going on everywhere. The officers told the soldiers to go to Prizren and sell the things they had stolen.

A Franciscan priest who visited Luma reported seeing "poor bayonetted babies" on the streets.

=== Opoja and Restelica ===
After the defeat at Lumë, Serbian troops were ordered to exterminate the population of the villages of Opoja, Gora, Bellobrad, Brrut, Rrenc, Bresanë, Zym and Qafëleshi. Thousands of men, women and children were killed and their houses burned down. Survivors hid in the mountains or in wells where some suffocated; in one case, a mother held her infant above the water. Some were killed at local bridges, and their bodies were eaten by dogs. Local gypsies greeted the Serbian troops with drums and music; they were killed and buried in the Opoja mosque.

=== Kumanovo and Kratovo ===
After the Battle of Kumanovo, Chetnik paramilitary groups supported by the Serbian Army attacked and expelled the Albanian populations of Kratovo. Leo Freundlich, wrote that: "Near Kratovo, General Stepanović, having ordered hundreds of Albanians to form two rows, shot them down with machine guns. Thereupon, the general explained: These scoundrels must be exterminated so that Austria may no longer be able to find her darlings"

=== Gostivar ===
Photograph of Albanian prisoners in front of the Kumanovo Municipality building after the Battle of Kumanovo

After the Battle of Kumanovo on 23–24 October 1912, the Morava division of the Serbian army entered Gostivar. Hundreds of Albanians were killed, resulting in protests from Vienna. Leopold Berchtold, appalled by the massacre, asked Belgrade to withdraw from Albanian territory. On 21 November 1912, he wrote letters to Paris, London, Berlin, Rome and Petrograd: "The behavior of the Serbian army towards the Albanian people does not belong to any international human rights norm, but after the occupation of the countries they choose no means of dealing with it anymore. They acted brutally against the innocent and defenseless population".

=== Skopje ===
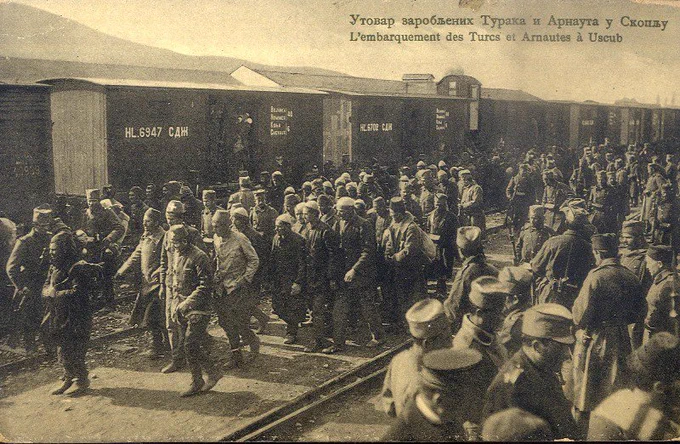
Albanians and Turkish prisoners being loaded onto train cars in Skopje

According to the Daily Chronicle, Serbian soldiers killed about 2,000 Muslim Albanians in the vicinity of Skopje by 12 November 1912. In the First Balkan War, 80% of the Muslim (mainly Albanian) villages in the Monastir (Bitola) and Skopje city regions were destroyed by the Serbian army which engaged in indiscriminate killings of Muslims.

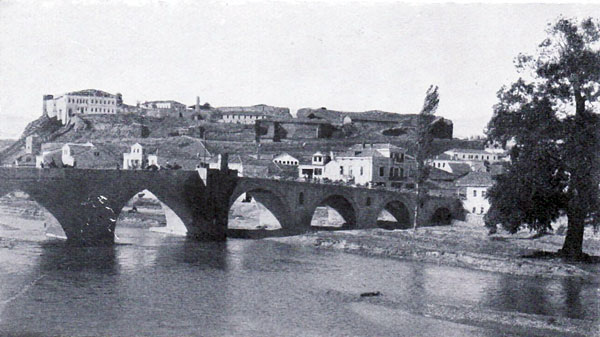
Bridge over the Vardar in Skopje

Leon Trotsky reported that the headless bodies of Albanians were piled up under the bridge over the Vardar in Skopje. According to his reports, Serbian soldiers spoke openly about their killings of Albanian and Turkish civilians.

=== Mitrovica ===
On 18 November 1912, Sir F. Cartwright wrote to Sir Edward Grey that the Serbian army entered Mitrovica, arrested the Austrian consul, and held him prisoner for 15 days; the consul escaped to Budapest after witnessing atrocities against Albanian civilians.

Serbian soldiers killed 17 Albanian civilians when they entered Vushtrri on 13 August 1913. The killings were documented in a letter from British vice-consul W. D. Peckham in Skopje to British ambassador Ralph Paget in Belgrade.

=== Peja ===
The Serbian army bombarded the city of Pejë and razed villages in 1912, aided by Chetniks. Edith Durham wrote about refugees from Peć after the Serbian army entered the city in 1913:

An Ipek man, well educated and of high standing, told of what happened there. "Every day the telal cried in the streets 'To-day the Government will shoot ten (or more) men! No one knew which men they would be, or why they were shot. They were stood in a trench, which was to be their grave. Twelve soldiers fired and as the victims fell the earth was shovelled over them, whether living or dead. Baptisms were forced by torture. Men were plunged into the ice-cold river, and then half roased till they cried for mercy". Many, terrorized into baptism, came to me.

About 10,000 Albanians in Peć were forcibly converted.

=== Novi Pazar ===
When Serb troops entered the Sanjak of Novi Pazar, hundreds of civilians were killed. The Ibar Army under General Mihailo Zivkovic entered the sanjak and pacified the Albanian population with "soletudinem faciunt pacem appelant" ("They make a desert and call it peace").

=== Viti ===
In October 1913, Serbian soldiers investigated a local Albanian ruler named Rrustem Januz Kabashi (1891–1914) who resided in the local mountains. The soldiers demanded that the kachaks surrender which resulted in two Serbian soldiers getting shot. When nightfall came, the Serbian military, paramilitary and armed civilians surrounded the village and arrested all males over the age of 15. The arrested were placed in the local mosque, and then transported to the local tower in Viti. The village was looted and set on fire and the inhabitants killed at a local pit which had been prepared. Among the killed, 40-year-old Zenel Rexhepi, 20-year-old Qazim Shabani, 19-year old Rrustem Sallahu and 17-year old Shaban Sallahu were burned alive. 54 civilians were killed.

== Vilayet of Manastir ==
=== Manastir ===
It is estimated that about 80% of the–mainly Albanian–villages in the Manastir region and the Albanian quarters of the city were destroyed by the Serbian army which engaged in indiscriminate massacres of Muslims.

=== Ohrid ===
In the town of Ohrid, Serbian forces killed 150 Bulgarians and 500 Albanians and Turks.

=== Dibra ===
On 20 September 1913, the Serbian Army carried off all the cattle in Dibër, Malësia. Although the herdsmen fought back, all were killed. The Serbians also killed two Lumë chieftains (Mehmet Edhemi and Xhaferr Elezi) and pillaged and burned the villages of Peshkopi, Blliçë and Dohoshisht in lower Dibër County and seven other villages in upper Dibër County. Women, children and old people were tortured and killed.

When Serbian troops looted the villages of Dibra, armed Albanians killed the soldiers. The Serbs responded by burning down 24 villages.

=== Pelagonia ===
Serb majors M. Vasić and Vasilije Trbić gathered 30 Chetniks in September 1912 and travelled to Desovo, where they shot 111 Albanian men and razed the village. In nearby Brailovo, Trbić executed 60 Albanians.

=== Porcasi and Sulp ===
In the villages, Serbian soldiers took the men out and asked the women to pay for their release. They were put inside a mosque after payment, which was blown up. In Sulp, 73 Albanians were also killed.

== Vilayet of Janina ==
The Greek army sought to take full control of the Vilayet of Janina in the Balkan Wars and as it marched northwards, its campaign was resisted by local Albanians. One of the regions which were captured by the Greek army in the Vilayet of Janina was Chameria (today almost entirely part of Greece). Within a few days after the Greek army secured control of the region, a Cretan Greek paramilitary under commanders Deligiannakis and Spiros Fotis, killed 75 Cham notables of Paramythia who were gathered to pledge allegiance to the Greek state.

As a response to resistance, the Greek forces began executing irregulars and regularly killing prisoners; authorities also encouraged harsher actions against civilians. These measures were common by the time the Greek forces entered Albania. According to an infantry officer, villagers were "mowed down like sparrows" and houses were being burnt down.

The Greek army withdrew from the area after the recognition of the Albanian independence and the delineation of the border. Later, the Greek forces committed multiple atrocities in Southern Albania leading up to and during WWI.

Events which involve the activities of the Greek army in the region were extensively described in works by local Albanian writers who lived in the area. In December 1912, delegates from the regions of Chameria and Delvinë requested that the Albanian Vlora government to ensure the safety of the local Albanian populations from the Greek massacres. In the following month, the Vlora government requested at the London Ambassador's Conferences that all regions inhabited by Albanians should be territories of the Albanian state.

== Internment and death marches ==
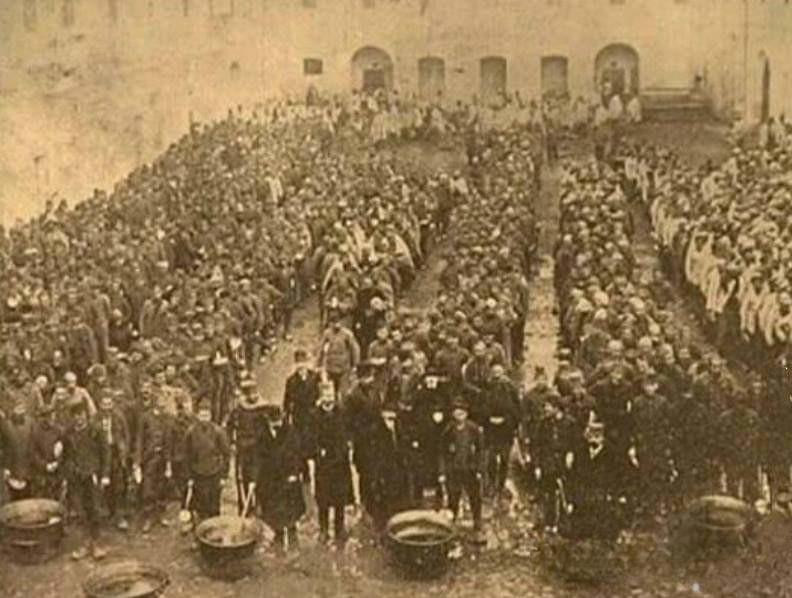

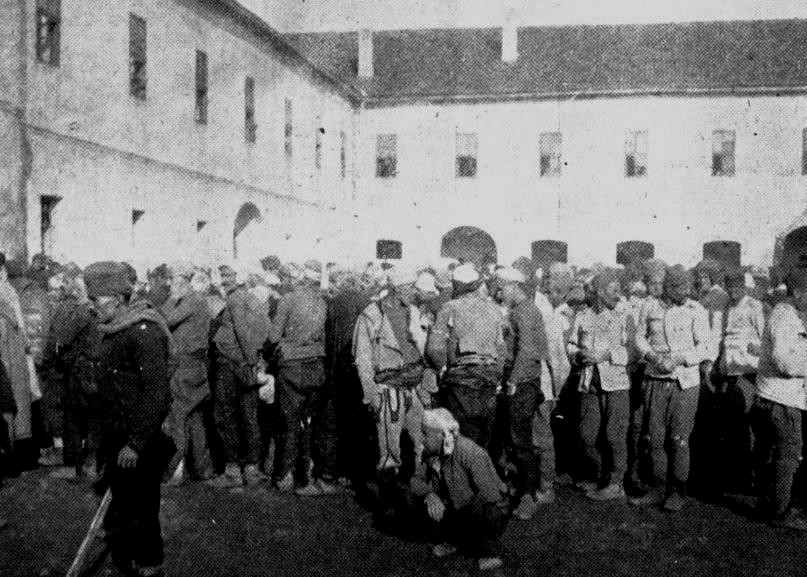
Albanians in a Belgrade prison camp

On 6 January 1913, a Romanian doctor reported that hundreds of Muslims in captivity were forced to march for a hundred kilometers. When a captive would collapse from starvation or exhaustion, they'd be bayoneted by the nearest soldier. Among the victims were men, women, children, and the elderly.

In Prizren, two hundred Albanians were forced to carry fifty to sixty kilograms of equipment to Lumë for seven hours in the night.

During the conflicts, Albanians were sent to concentration camps in Niš and Belgrade. According to the Institute of History in Pristina, on 27 October 1912, 650 Albanians were sent to a concentration camp in Niš and, on 30 October, 700 more arrived.

There were also reports of summary executions. During November 1912, in the fortress of Niš, a fifty-year-old woman had her skull shattered by Serbian soldiers for allegedly throwing bombs at Serbian forces in Ferizaj.

== Eyewitness reports ==
=== Edith Durham ===
For 12 years, British anthropologist Edith Durham travelled to the region and became knowledgeable about Albania and Albanians. Durham was in Montenegro in August 1912, saw Montenegrin preparations for war along the border, and alerted the British press; she thought that Montenegro was attempting to provoke the Ottomans into a conflict, and witnessed the outbreak of hostilities when Montenegrin King Nicholas ordered his army to fire artillery shots into Albania. As the war began, Durham sent news to the British press; for some time, she was the only war correspondent from Montenegro. Durham wrote for the Evening Chronicle and the Manchester Guardian before learning that the papers "were cutting and even doctoring her articles".

Early in the conflict, Durham (a nurse) was involved in relief work with the Red Cross and became aware of the atrocities. Close to the hostilities, she described razed villages and refugees; some had to shelter in outhouses. Writing a strongly-worded indictment of Serb and Montenegrin behavior, she visited over a thousand families whose homes were razed and noted the negative view Montenegrins had of Albanians. Durham encountered front-line soldiers such as a Serb officer who viewed his time in Kosovo as "heroism" and "nearly choked with laughter" as he talked about "bayonet[ing] the women and children of Luma". She heard other officers say that "no one would dare speak the dirty language" (Albanian) in the newly acquired territories, and they told her openly about the violence used to convert Catholic and Muslim Albanians to Orthodox Christianity. At the Montenegrin-Albanian frontier, Durham described "nose cutting" and other mutilation for "their commanders". She ended her friendship with King Nicholas because of the Montenegrin army's actions. The Albanian leadership used Durham's reports to strengthen their nationalist rhetoric, objecting to the violence committed by armies in the region.

=== Leon Trotsky ===
Leon Trotsky, sent by a socialist Kiev newspaper to cover the Balkan Wars, reported on the violence against Albanians. A few days after Skopje came under Serb control, Trotsky described the situation in and around the city. He was not in the theatre of war, compiling his information from discussions with witnesses such as a Serbian friend who referred to "horrors" in Macedonia. The friend had obtained a military pass to travel to Skopje, and told Trotsky:

... The horrors actually began as soon as we crossed the old frontier. By five p.m. we were approaching Kumanovo. The sun had set, it was starting to get dark. But the darker the sky became, the more brightly the fearful illumination of the fires stood out against it. Burning was going on all around us. Entire Albanian villages had been turned into pillars of fire ... In all its fiery monotony this picture was repeated the whole way to Skopje ... For two days before my arrival in Skopje the inhabitants had woken up in the morning to the sight, under the principal bridge over the Vardar - that is, in the very centre of the town - of heaps of Albanian corpses with severed heads. Some said that these were local Albanians, killed by the komitadjis [chetniks], others that the corpses were brought down to the bridge by the waters of the Vardar. What was clear was that these headless men had not been killed in battle.

Trotsky's account from his Serbian friend referred to the actions of Serb troops in Skopje: looting, arson and torture of its Albanian inhabitants, about which they spoke publicly. Many of the Skopje atrocities were committed at night by Serb paramilitaries; in the morning, hundreds of headless Albanian corpses were in the Vardar River at the main bridge. Although it was certain that the bodies were not casualties of war, it was unknown if they were Albanians from the area or had floated down from the upper Vardar. Albanian villages were burned, and irregular troops invaded homes to kill and loot. Trotsky's Serbian friend said that Skopje had become a military camp, and Serb peasant troops looted food, livestock and doors and windows from Albanian houses. He expressed disgust with Serbian officer brutality, but a corporal told him that they differed from the komitajis (paramilitaries). According to the corporal, the army "would not kill anyone younger than twelve years of age" but "the komitajis engage in murder, robbery and violence as a savage sport". Army authorities sent some komitajis home due to the embarrassment they caused the military. The Serb informant wrote to Trotsky that "meat is rotting, human flesh as well as the flesh of oxen"; the conflict "brutalized" people and made them lose "their human aspect". Trotsky's Serbian friend encountered a corporal in Kosovo who described his actions as "roasting chickens and killing Arnauts [Albanians]. But we're tired of it." In his report to Kievskaya Misl, Trotsky wrote about the "atrocities committed against the Albanians of Macedonia and Kosovo in the wake of the Serbian invasion of October 1912". He reported that when Peter I of Serbia was on a tour of the front lines, he said that Albanians should be clubbed to death to save ammunition.

=== Italian consulate and British embassy ===
A British Foreign Office report noted a telegram from the Italian consul in Skopje: "Atrocities being committed by Serbian troops and their evident intention of extirpating as many of the Albanian inhabitants as possible". A Swiss engineer employed as an overseer for the Oriental Railway submitted a report to the British embassy in Belgrade detailing Skopje after the arrival of Serbian troops. The report called the conduct of Serbs toward the Muslim population "cruel in every way", appearing to "have for its object their complete extermination". The engineer wrote that the sound of gunfire began early in the day and continued until late; prisoners were treated badly, and officers were shot without trial: "An order was issued to soldiers in certain places to kill all Albanians from the age of eight years upwards with a view to extermination. The Serbians have ill treated the sick, women and children." His report described the destruction of mosques, the razing of villages, and about 500 bodies floating in the Vardar River; "the Albanians were desperate".

=== Carlo Papa ===
The Italian military attaché Carlo Papa (1869–1955) who followed the Serbian army in the First Balkan War reported that after the Serbian victory at Kumanovo, the Muslims abandoned the Kumanovo area villages, after which both the retreating Ottoman army and Serbian guerrillas destroyed these villages. Papa addressed the rumours of massacres that the Serbian army was accused of in the media, saying that he heard from consuls at Skopje and Bitola (particularly the Austro-Hungarian) about atrocities in Novi Pazar, and because it was claimed by consuls, he believed it to be true, but noted that it could have been exaggerated on purpose. According to international press, there were burnt down villages and fields between Skopje and the Montenegrin border, and he visited this area in March 1913 and noted that only a few houses were destroyed, much less than in Kumanovo and Bitola. He deemed Ferizaj, which according to press was completely destroyed and its Albanians massacred, to instead be substantially intact, and the Albanians were undisturbed working the fields. He did believe that some local Macedonian Serbs who were previously oppressed enacted revenge. In the surroundings of Bitola, Papa witnessed that people burnt down abandoned villages without the interference of Serbian authorities. He concluded that the reported news were exaggerated and acts of violence needed to be considered according to the historical and social setting.

=== Historicity ===
Scholarship treats wartime correspondence from the Balkan Wars as first-hand evidence, and historian Wolfgang Höpken says that those sources need to be handled carefully. Höpken says that although reporters (such as Trotsky) who provided firsthand information were not near the theatre of war, Trotsky's accounts of the Balkan Wars were "some of the most brilliant and most analytical war reports".

Contemporary journalists based in the Balkans, such as Richard von Mach from the Kölnische Zeitung, said that accounts were often from a third party or "even pure fiction". Writers like Carl Pauli obtained their information from unnamed witnesses or gathered evidence from the extensive compilation by Leo Freundlich, who wrote about the Albanian conflict zone with empathy for its Albanian victims. According to Höpken, these sources are significant but their information "can hardly be taken for granted".

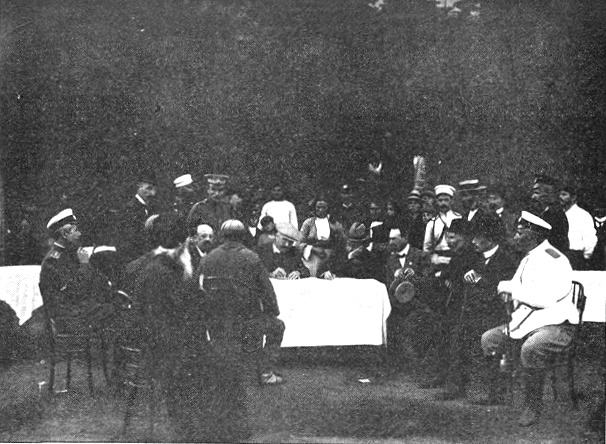
The Carnegie Commission listening to refugees from the Balkan Wars in 1913

The oft-cited International Carnegie Commission report "cannot", says Höpken, "be read without a due deconstructative effort on the part of the historian". However, historian Alan Kramer regards the Carnegie Commission report as a "remarkably well-documented and impartial investigation, coolly sceptical of exaggerated claims, reached conclusions that have not been improved to this day." Diplomatic missions in the Balkans repeatedly sent reports of rumors and news about violent acts committed by all participants in the Balkan Wars, and often complainted about their inability to obtain firsthand data. Reports from British consuls described many violent acts committed by Serb irregular forces in Kosovo and Macedonia after their capture in 1912-1913 by the Royal Serbian Army. The British government was suspicious of the authenticity of the complaints and reports, and hesitated to undertake political action.

As political relations with Russia and Serbia had been worsening since the 1903 overthrow, by Captain Dragutin Dimitrijević and other Yugoslavist military officers, of the former Serbian royal family for being too much in favour of detente with Austria-Hungary in the May coup, the Foreign Office of Austria-Hungary was keenly interested in accurately documenting the precise details of Serbian war crimes and carefully scrutinised the reliability of their sources. Austro-Hungarians said that although there was often "a great deal of exaggeration" of data in their possession, accounts from verified witnesses confirmed the mass killings of women and children, wide-scale looting and the razing of villages. In Skopje, the Austro-Hungarian consul Heimroth sent his assistants into the field numerous times to examine news of atrocities before sending reports (such as "Gausamkeiten der Serben gegen Albaner") to Vienna.

An extensive report by the Catholic bishop Lazër Mjeda on Serbian violence towards the Skopje area's Muslim and Catholic Albanian inhabitants was the subject of detailed discussion and an investigation by the Austro-Hungarian consulate, which ultimately concluded that the bishop's report was well-founded. In his report, Consul Heimroth said that Serbian forces should at least be held to account for not halting the violence against Muslims after their arrival in Skopje. Heimroth said that he had received more complaints of wartime violence then he had in the Russo-Japanese War, and a conflict officially aimed at liberating fellow Christians from Sharia Law was being concluded with an attempt to exterminate all non-Serbian and non-Eastern Orthodox inhabitants.

Observations by "reliable" and "non-partisan" informants who witnessed the events "left no doubt", Höpken says, that extensive violence (such as the razing of homes and villages and forced population movements) occurred. Apart from what Höpken calls "suspicious slaughter narratives" in second- and third-hand accounts, doctors and nurses verified that the "conflict had gone beyond all rules and regulations".

In Albanian literature and historical scholarship, the actions described in Durham's accounts are the outcome of anti-Albanian policies organised at the highest levels of the Serb government to "exterminate Albanians". According to Daut Dauti, Durham's wartime reports "amounted to atrocity testimonies committed against Albanians". Durham's accounts were criticised by Rebecca West, a fellow traveler of the region. West called Durham naive (ridiculing her support of a false 1912 report which claimed that the Austrian consul had been castrated by Serbs in Prizren), but historian Benjamin Lieberman wrote that West has been accused of pro-Serbian bias. Lieberman said that Durham was an eyewitness to the conflict and, in Trotsky's interviews with ethnic Serbs, his informants lacked a motive to portray their fellow troops (and citizens) negatively. He called Trotsky, Durham and others' accounts consistent and corroborated by additional sources, such as Catholic Church officials who cited multiple massacres.

Photographs of Albanian refugees from the Balkan Wars
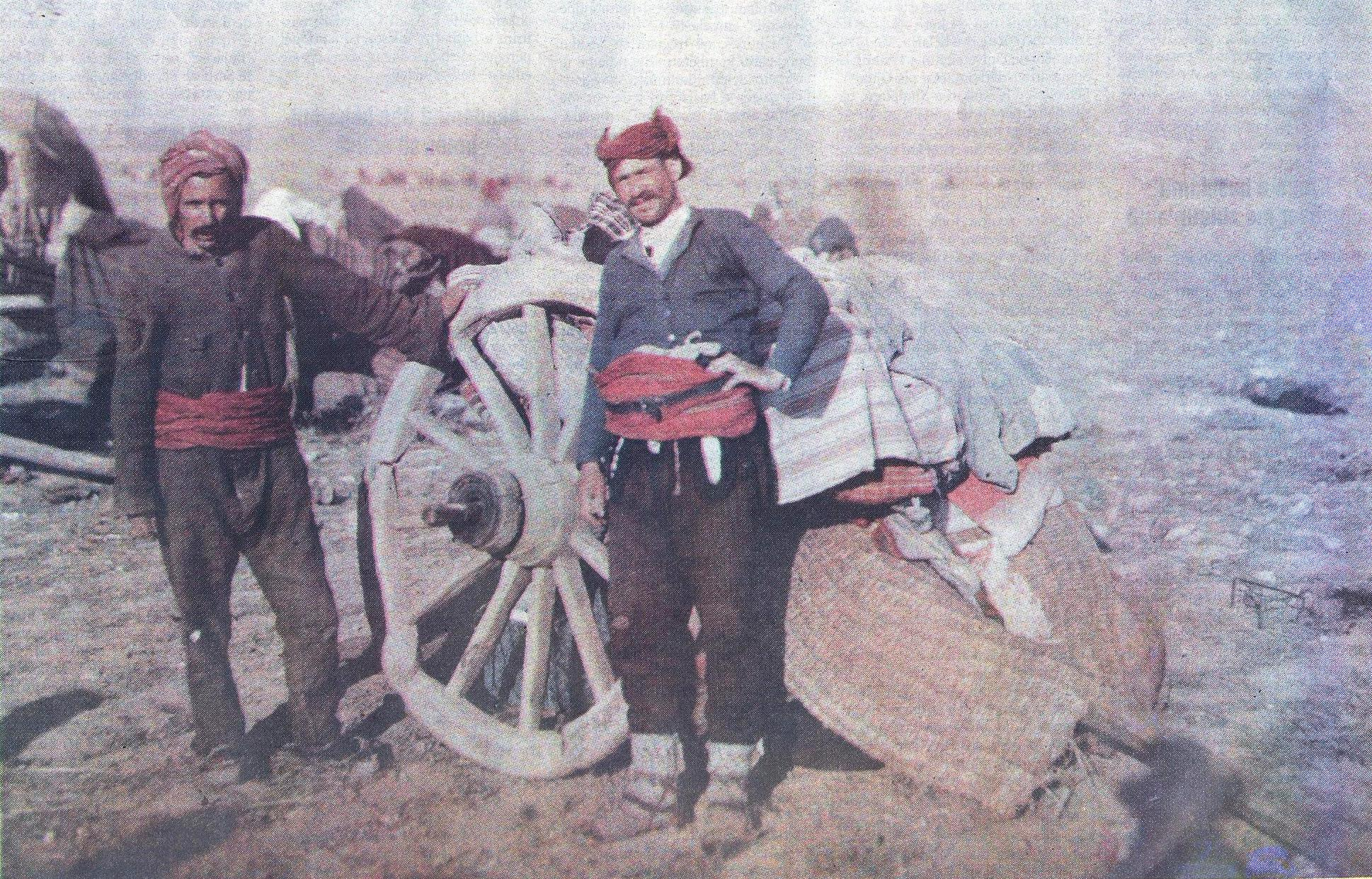
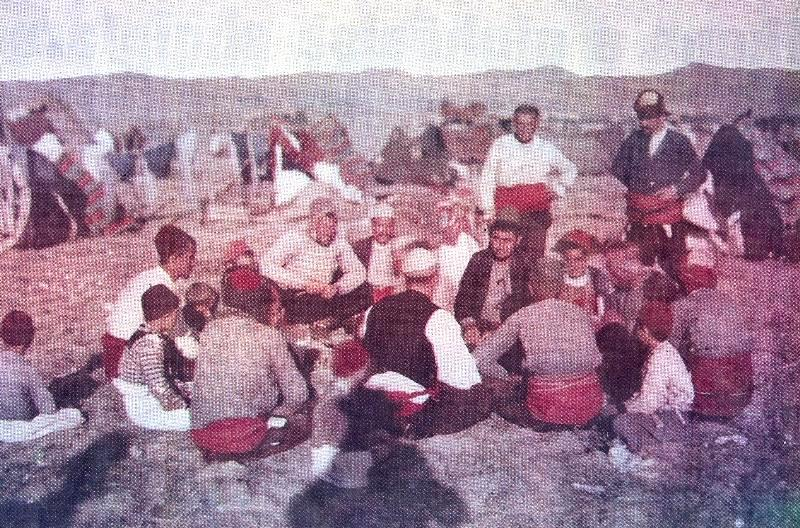
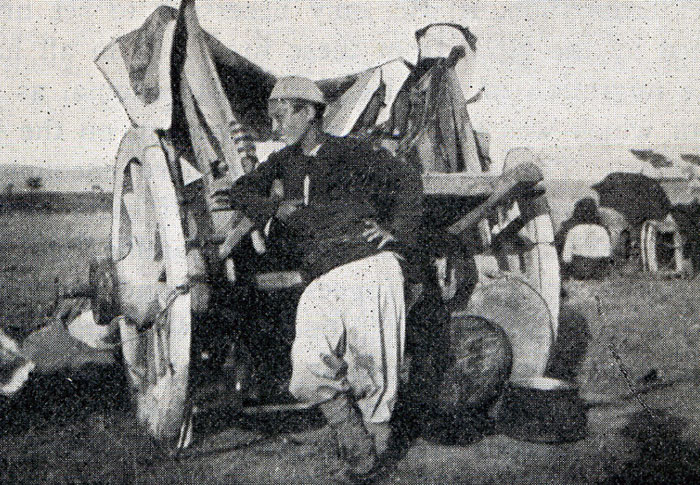
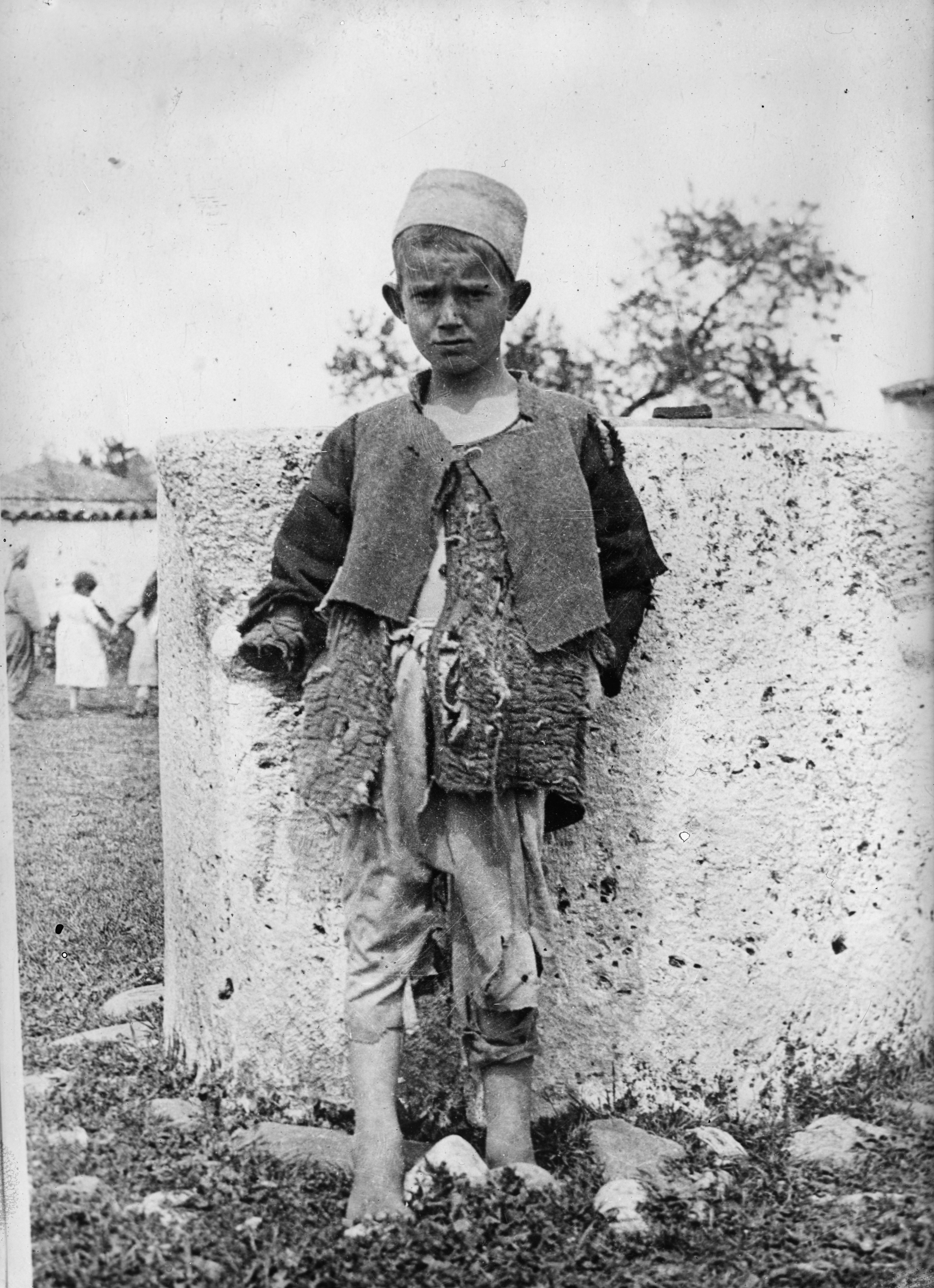

== Death toll ==
Reliable statistics exist for the number of military casualties of the Balkan Wars. A research gap exists for civilian victims (often members of a targeted ethnic or religious group) because the statistics have been interpreted for partisan purposes. Most contemporary sources provide an approximated death toll of 20,000 or 25,000 in the Kosovo Vilayet. The figure of 25,000 was published in January 1913 by Lazër Mjeda, Leon Trotsky, and Leo Freundlich; however, there is no scholarly consensus on what point in the war these estimates refer to. These estimates are likely only accurate for the first two to four months of the conflict.

According to a publishment by the University of Belgrade, 50,000 Albanians were killed within present-day Kosovo. This estimate assumed the total population of the Kosovo Vilayet was 1.1 million with less than half living in present-day Kosovo. The figure was obtained by approximating that 10% of the population of present-day Kosovo (which they estimated to be 500,000) was victimized, leading to a figure of 50,000. The population figure used for the Kosovo Vilayet in this estimate was from 1905, which was far lower than the 1911 population (c. 1.6 million per census data).

Serbian socialists have also provided estimates. Kosta Novaković approximated that 120,000 Albanians were killed in Kosovo and Macedonia, and Triša Kaclerović gave the same estimate in all Serbian-occupied regions. Novaković and Kaclerović both participated in Serbian military actions during the Balkan Wars. According to Jing Ke, between 120,000 and 270,000 Albanians were killed from 1912 to 1914.

Justin McCarthy provided an estimate of 100,000 Muslim deaths in present-day Albania during the conflicts. However, his figures remain controversial due to his view that the Armenian genocide did not meet the criteria for genocide and his reputation as a pro-Turkish scholar.

Regional death estimates (≥1,000 in Descending Order)
| Source | Estimate | Region(s) | Date Approximated | Cause(s) of Death |
|---|---|---|---|---|
| William Willard Howard | 200,000+ | "Albania" | 1912–1913 | Killed and burned |
| Antonio Baldacci | 150,000 | Areas occupied by Serbia | 1912–1913 | Killed |
| Jing Ke | 120,000–270,000 | All | 1912–1914 | Killed |
| Kosta Novaković | 120,000 | Kosovo and Macedonia | 1912–1913 | Killed |
| Triša Kaclerović | 120,000 | Areas occupied by Serbia | 1912–1913 | Killed |
| Committee of Kosovo | 100,000 | Kosovo | 1913–1915 | Killed |
| Justin McCarthy | 100,000 | Albania | 1912–1913 | All causes |
| University of Belgrade | 50,000 | Present-day Kosovo | 1912–1913 | Killed |
| The Times | 25,000 | Northeastern Albania | 1912 | Massacred |
| Contemporary reports | 20,000–25,000 | Kosovo Vilayet | by November 1912 or January | Massacred |

=== Demographic changes ===
The Balkan Wars significantly impacted the demography of the former Ottoman Vilayets. In 1911, the Kosovo Vilayet had a population of approximately 1.6 million with 959,175 Muslim inhabitants–mostly Albanians. The number of Albanians living in the Kingdom of Yugoslavia in 1918 was 441,740, which included most of the territories from the former Kosovo Vilayet and part of the former Manastir Vilayet.

== Classification of genocide ==
The atrocities that took place constituted ethnic cleansing, however, some scholars, historians and Albanian political parties including PD, Besa and DUI also recognize the violence against Albanians as either a genocide or part of a larger genocide against Muslims during the Balkan Wars. The 1998 translation of Albania's Golgotha by the Juka Publishing Company refers to the events as a genocide. Albanologist Robert Elsie uses the word "extermination". Historian Mark Levene included the Luma insurrection's resulting deaths and estimated flight of 25,000 as "insufficiently significant in itself", but part of the "broader swathe of atrocity of the Balkan Wars ... a localized genocide".

=== Systematic extermination ===
The United States Department of State, along with multiple scholars, historians, and contemporary accounts, have also referred to the violent acts against the Albanian population as systematic extermination or a result of systematic policy, which is a form of genocide. According to historian Katrin Boeckh, the numerous atrocities by Serbian troops against Albanians was the first ethnic cleansing campaign committed in Europe during the 20th century. The Carnegie commission stated that the goal of the violence was "the entire transformation of the ethnic character of regions inhabited exclusively by Albanians." Nonpartisan witnesses included foreign workers and engineers from the Oriental Railway and local and foreign Christian clergy. Some observers suspected that forced population movements (ethnic cleansing) were part of an organised extermination effort. Höpken finds insufficient support for that position in the sources, and the events "radicalised" the continuing course toward homogeneous ethnic populations. A translation of a 1913 article published in the German newspaper Frankfurter Zeitung by Robert Elsie describes the atrocities as a policy of extermination by the Kingdom of Serbia. In an italicized section before the newspaper article, Elsie writes that the Central Powers were "hostile to Serbia's expansion into the southern Balkans and shocked at its Albanian extermination policies."

=== Genocidal intent ===
Serbian officials and generals have reportedly stated that they were going to exterminate the Albanians. Historian Mark Mazower writes that despite the "careless talk of 'exterminating' the Albanian population", the killing of "perhaps thousands of civilians" by Serbian armed forces in the provinces of Kosovo and Monastir was "prompted more by revenge than genocide". Conversely, according to Arben Qirezi, King Peter I of Serbia had directly given orders to his army to execute Albanian civilians in Kumanovo during the Balkan Wars.

== Reactions ==
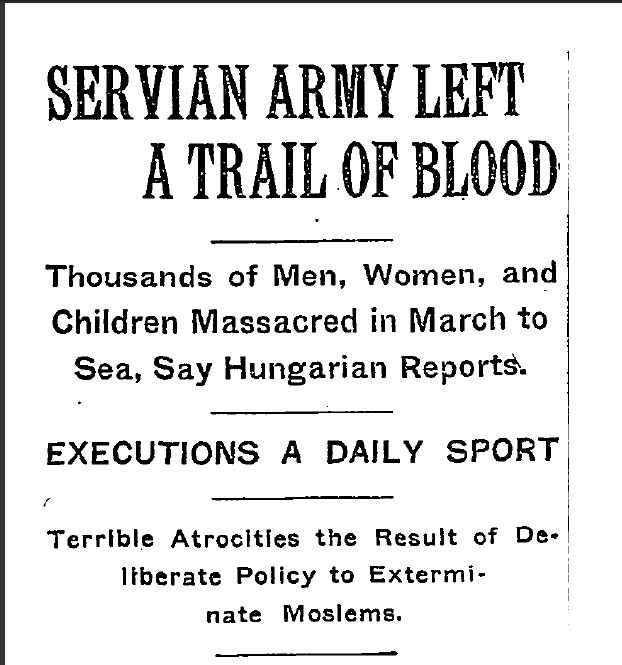
31 December 1912 New York Times headline

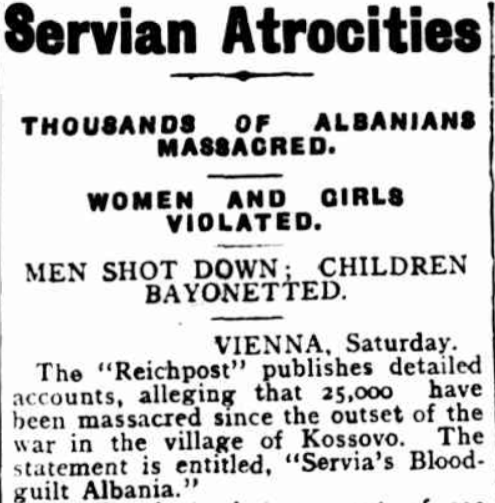
20 January 1913 The Bathurst National Advocate headline

On 21 December 1913, the Italian paper Corriere delle Puglie published statistics of the Serbian atrocities on the Albanian civil population. This was republished in 1919 in a report titled Les atrocités commises par les Serbes dans l’Albanie septentrionale après l’amnistie accordée en octobre dernier, intended for the Great Powers (Great Britain, France, Germany, Austria-Hungary, Russia and Italy). The report describes the atrocities of the Serbian troops committed against the Albanian population and villages in Dibra and Luma. It mentions total deaths and burned villages, as well as looting and plunder.

The Serbian deputy and intellectual Triša Kaclerović in an article published in 1917 by the International Bulletin affirmed that in 1912-1913 120,000 Albanians were massacred by the Serbian army.

In 1913, Hasan Prishtina visited the International Control Commission at the end of October and handed it a long list in French about the atrocities committed by the Serbian army in September and October. The list labeled which houses were looted and how many people were killed.

In January 1913, the French consul Maurice Carlier wrote to the Ministry of Foreign Affairs in France of the miserable conditions of the Albanian population living in the territories occupied by the Serbian army.

On 29 December 1912, the Italian paper La Stampa published an article about the Serbian troopers massacre of Albanian women and children hiding in Prochaskas consulate:

"The door was broken down. The Albanian families taking refuge in the Consulate were slaughtered for no reason in a horrible carnage: the wounded were massacred in their beds. Even the women and children were killed after the bestial soldiers had satisfied their lusts on the unhappy ones. There were among these Serbs also some who desecrated the bodies of the dead! The consul vigorously protested against these facts, but the Serbs laughed at him."

According to the German newspaper Berliner Tageblatt und Handels-Zeitung, Abend-Ausgabe, in a publication from November 14, 1912, an article mentions:

"Now, as the world reverberates with the atrocities perpetrated against the Albanian people by Serbian troops, European newspapers remain silent. Photographs of impaled women and children were shown as evidence. The Albanians are also protesting against the extermination of the Albanians in Vilayet of Kosovo".

According to Misha Glenny, Serbian press published banner headlines (such as "Get ready for war! The joint Serbo-Bulgarian offensive will start any minute now!") on the eve of war to encouraging patriotic hysteria. French general Frédéric-Georges Herr reported on 3 January 1913 that "in the Albanian massif, the numerous massacres that bloodied this region reduced the population to strong proportions. Many villages were destroyed and the land remained barren". Edith Durham, the European socialists Leo Freundlich and Leon Trotsky, and Serbian socialists such as Kosta Novaković, Dragiša Lapčević and Dimitrije Tucović condemned the atrocities against Albanians and supported Albanian self-determination.

Durham wrote about Isa Boletini and how Dragutin Dimitrijević (Apis) and his friends betrayed the Albanians after they revolted against the Ottomans: "Having used their ammunition in the recent rebellions, the bulk of the Albanians were practically unarmed, and were pitilessly massacred by the invading armies. Apis and his friends who had posed as friends of the Albanians now spared neither man, woman nor child. How many were massacred in Kosovo vilayet will never be known".

To investigate the crimes, the Carnegie Endowment for International Peace formed a commission which was sent to the Balkans in 1913. Summing up the situation in Albanian areas, the commission concluded:

Houses and whole villages reduced to ashes, unarmed and innocent populations massacred en masse, incredible acts of violence, pillage and brutality of every kind – such were the means which were employed and are still being employed by the Serbo-Montenegrin soldiery, with a view to the entire transformation of the ethnic character of regions inhabited exclusively by Albanians.

— Report of the International Commission on the Balkan Wars

Serbian territorial claims on the region were complicated by the issue of war crimes committed by Serbian forces which were part of the International Commission on the Balkan Wars investigation. The report was received negatively by Serb historians and officials, although the Serbian side was treated with restraint compared with others who had participated in the conflict. The socialist press in Serbia referred to crimes, and Serbian socialist Dimitrije Tucović wrote about the Serbian campaign in Kosovo and northern Albania. The Serbian social-democratic newspaper Radnica novice reported that innocent Albanians were plundered and their villages devastated.

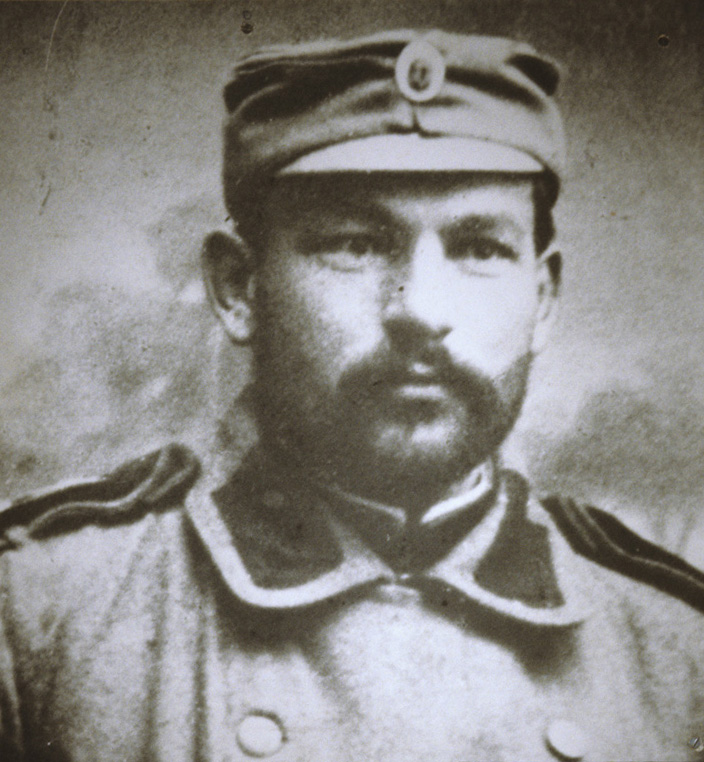
Captain Dimitrije Tucović

We have carried out the attempted premeditated murder of an entire nation. We were caught in that criminal act and have been obstructed. Now we have to suffer the punishment .... In the Balkan Wars, Serbia not only doubled its territory, but also its external enemies.

— Dimitrije Tucović

Although Tucović reminded his Serbian readers in 1913 of Karl Marx's "prophetic" quote ("The nation that oppresses another nation forges its own chains"), the Serbian Orthodox Church had whipped up nationalist hatred of Albanians. In his book Srbija i Arbanija, he wrote:

The bourgeois press called for merciless annihilation and the army acted upon this. Albanian villages, from which the men had fled in time, were reduced to ashes. At the same time, these were barbarian crematoria in which hundreds of women and children were burned.

— Dimitrije Tucović

During the second half of the twentieth century, historian Vladimir Dedijer researched Serbian foreign relations of the era. Dedijer equated Serbian actions (such as Nikola Pašić's description of eyewitness accounts as foreign propaganda) with those of European colonial armies in South America and Africa. The British and German press published articles about the large number of Albanian deaths in Albania and Kosovo, and the attempts by the Serbian government to conceal the reality from its people by censorship. An 18 January 1913 Times of London article reported that 25,000 Albanians were killed in northeastern Albania by Serbian forces.

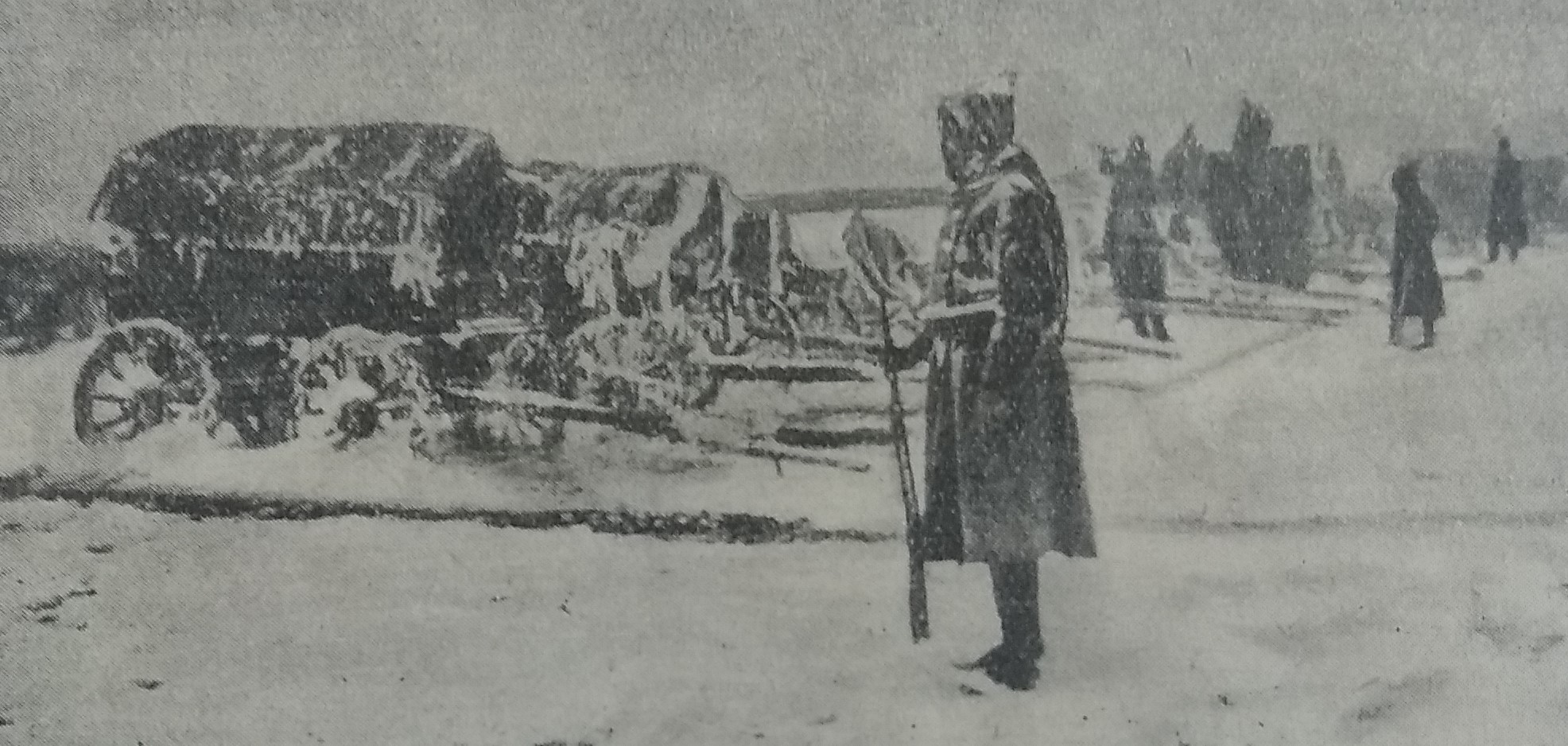
Serbian army in Albania in 1913

Russia played a significant part in the territorial division of Albanian regions and propaganda about crimes committed by Serbs. Russian foreign minister Sergey Sazonov warned Pašić a number of times through the Serbian representative in St. Petersburg about the need to disavow every single case, like Gjakova (where Serbian forces reportedly shot 300 Albanians. Sazonov repeatedly told the Serbs that the Austrians were prepared to accept Gjakova as part of Serbia if no casualties occurred. Russia also helped Serbia gain the towns of Debar, Prizren and Pec from Albania (and tried to gain Gjakova), and Austria-Hungary attempted to retain the remaining territory for Albania.

The Russian newspaper Novoye vremya refused to acknowledge Serbian atrocities against Albanian civilians in Skopje and Prizren in 1913, citing local Catholic priests who said that the Serbian army had not committed a single act of violence against the civil population. American relief agent B. Peele Willett wrote in his 1914 report, "The Christian Work Fall":

... Serbian and Montenegrin troops destroyed one hundred villages in northern Albania without warning, without provocation, without excuse ... 12,000 homes were burned and dynamited, 8,000 farm folk killed or burned to death, 125,000 made homeless. All livestock has been driven off. Corn fresh from the harvest has been carried away. Like hunted animals the farm folk fled to Elbasan, Tirana, Scutari and outlying villages. I have returned from a 400-mile journey, partly on foot, through these stricken regions. I saw the destroyed villages, the burned and dynamited houses. I saw the starving refugees. I saw women and children dying of hunger.

— B. Peele Willet

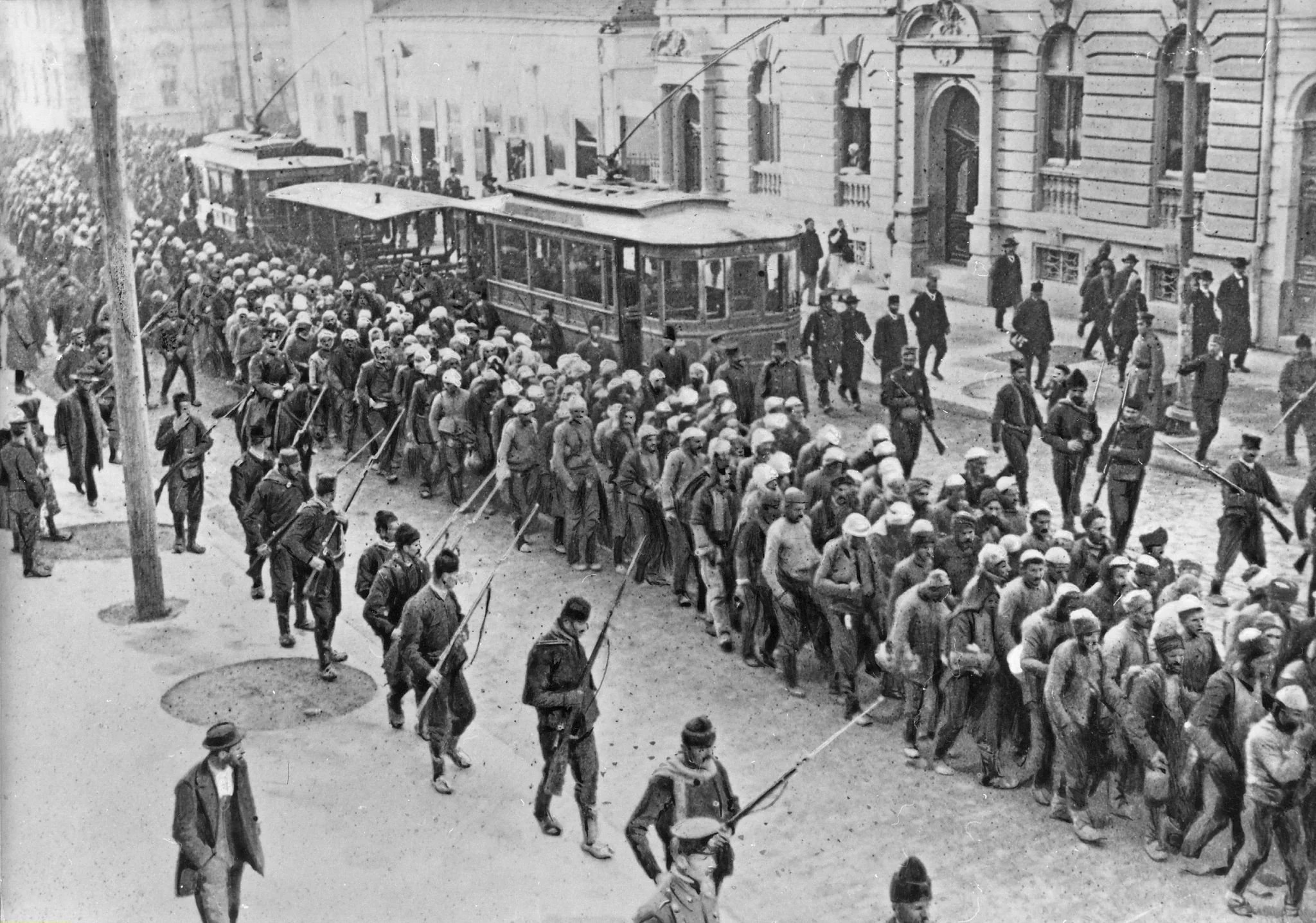
Captured Albanian POWs forced to march through Belgrade in 1913

The Habsburg envoy in Belgrade said that Serbian authorities sponsored and tolerated harsh treatment of Albanians (pillaging, arson, and executions) in the "liberated lands". The German newspaper Frankfurter Zeitung obtained reports corroborated by impartial European observers that massacres were committed against various local communities in Macedonia and Albania by Bulgarians, Serbs and Greeks. According to the newspaper, the Serbian position was that the Albanian population "must be eradicated".

Dayrell Crackanthorpe, a British diplomat, wrote to Edward Grey from Belgrade on 25 September 1913 that an Albanian uprising against Serbian forces was due (according to the Austrians) to Serbian occupation and civilian massacres. A Romanian physician wrote in the Bucharest newspaper Adevărul on 6 January 1913 that the actions of the Serbian army in Kosovo were "much more frightening than one could imagine". As the resistance in Lumë against Serbian troops continued, European public sentiment turned against Belgrade. In 2006, Günter Schödl wrote that the atrocities in Kosovo were part of the first recorded ethnic cleansing in the Balkans.

=== Serbia ===
The alleged war crimes were presented by Serbian Prime Minister Nikola Pašić as an invention of foreign propaganda, but despite this, British and German media continued publishing articles regarding massive Albanian casualties. The contemporary Serbian view of the Balkan Wars is largely that it was a struggle for freedom, a popular remark being "final liberation of the cradle of Serbdom and occupied brothers". In January 1913, the Serbian government forwarded a memorandum to British officials in which it denied all accusations of atrocities committed by the Serbian army and referred to the reports as “tendentious rumors” and “untrue”, stating that its troops “paid most scrupulous attention to the rights of humanity”.

In 2003, the Serbian Orthodox Church published a memorandum in which it claimed that “After the liberation of Kosovo and Metohija in 1912-13 there was no expulsion of the Albanian population from this area, nor did the Serbs take their revenge against them”.

== Aftermath ==
The wars created many refugees, some of whom fled to Istanbul or Anatolia. After the creation of Albania, Albanian refugees (particularly Muslims) also fled to Turkey. Serbian control was challenged by the fall 1913 Ohrid–Debar uprising; its suppression by Serbian forces resulted in tens of thousands of Albanian refugees arriving in Albania from western Macedonia. According to Freundlich, the Albanian refugee population in the town of Shkodër numbered 8,000-10,000; there were 7,000 refugees each in Shala and Iballë. Edvin Pezo wrote that a portion of the large refugee population in northern Albania probably came from Kosovo. Lack of assistance from the new Albanian government and Albanian immigration restrictions by the Ottomans drove many refugees to return home, often to destroyed houses. Survivors of the Balkan Wars, such as those in Skopje, often did not talk about their experiences. The Near East published a 1921 article about Albanian deputies who said at the 1 August Ambassador Conference in Tirana that between 1913 and 1920, Serbian forces killed 85,676 Albanian civilians in Kosovo and a number of villages had been burned. They also said that the Black Hand brought Russian colonists to settle in the regions where Albanians had been killed or expelled. The Kosovo committee claimed that 200,000 Albanians were killed by Serbian and Montenegrin forces in Kosovo from the end of the Balkan wars by 1919.

As a result of the 1913 Treaty of London, which assigned the former Ottoman lands to Serbia, Montenegro and Greece (most of the Kosovo Vilayet was awarded to Serbia), an independent Albania was recognised; Greece, Serbia and Montenegro agreed to withdraw from the new Principality of Albania. The principality included only about half of the territory inhabited by ethnic Albanians, however, and many Albanians remained in neighboring countries. Two Serbian Army invasions of Albania (in 1913 and May 1915) triggered Albanian sniper attacks on the army during its retreat, partially as retribution for Serbian brutality in the First Balkan War. After the Balkan Wars, massacres against the Albanians continued throughout World War I.

The Balkan Wars resulted in Serbian forces seeing themselves as "liberators", and non-Serbs became concerned about their place in the new reality. The current Serbian position on the Balkan Wars is that they were a final struggle to liberate the cradle of Serbdom and [its] occupied brothers.

Violent events, such as those in Skopje, are omitted from Macedonian and Yugoslav histories. Most Albanian and Kosovan history books present the attack on the Ottoman state to liberate Greeks, Serbs and Albanians from government misrule in a positive light, viewing the arrival (and conduct) of Serbian, Greek and Montenegrin military forces in Albania as chauvinistic and unwarranted. The "liberation" of the Albanian population by military force (especially by the Serbian and Montenegrin armies of the Balkan League) is described as an "invasion of enemies" or longstanding "foes". In Albania and Kosovo, this understanding of the Balkan Wars is part of the educational curriculum.

In 1998–99, war crimes similar to those in 1912 against the Albanian population were committed. These events have deeply affected Albania–Serbia relations.

== See also ==
- Albania during the Balkan Wars
- Anti-Albanian sentiment
- Massacres of Albanians in World War I
- War crimes in the 1999 Kosovo War

== Sources ==
- Bjelajac, Mile (2019). "The Austro-Hungarian Creation of a "Humanitarian" Pretext for the Planned Invasion of Serbia in 1912–1913: Facts and Counter-Facts". Balcanica. 50: 131–156.
- Elsie, Robert. "Leo Freundlich: Albania's Golgotha: Indictment of the Exterminators of the Albanian People". albanianhistory.net. Robert Eslie. Archived from the original on 31 May 2012.
- Elsie, Robert. "Archbishop Lazër Mjeda: Report on the Serb Invasion of Kosova and Macedonia". albanianhistory.net. Robert Elsie. Archived from the original on 3 March 2016.
- Kinley, Christopher (3 September 2021). "The Balkan War in Epirus: Religious Identity and the Continuity of Conflict". Journal of Balkan and Near Eastern Studies. 23 (5): 667–683. doi:10.1080/19448953.2021.1935077. ISSN 1944-8953.
- Liakos, Antonis; Doumanis, Nicholas (2023). The Edinburgh History of the Greeks, 20th and Early 21st Centuries: Twentieth and Early Twenty-First Centuries. Edinburgh University Press. doi:10.1515/9781474410830. ISBN 978-1-4744-1084-7.
- Becherelli, Alberto (2015). "Serbia and the Balkan Wars". Serbian-Italian Relations: History and Modern Times: Collection of Works. The Institute of History, Belgrade / Sapienza University of Rome, Research center CEMAS. pp. 75–80. ISBN 978-86-7743-109-9.
- Tsoutsoumpis, Spyros (December 2015). "Violence, resistance and collaboration in a Greek borderland: the case of the Muslim Chams of Epirus". Qualestoria (2): 119–138.
