= Serbian war crimes =

The following articles deal with Serbian war crimes:

- Expulsion of the Albanians, 1877–1878
- Serbian war crimes in the Balkan Wars
- Massacres of Albanians in World War I
- The Holocaust in German-occupied Serbia
- Romani Holocaust
- Chetnik war crimes in World War II
- Communist purges in Serbia in 1944–1945
- Serbian war crimes in the Yugoslav Wars
- Persecution of Croats in Serbia during the Yugoslav Wars
- Croatian War of Independence
- Bosnian genocide
- Ethnic cleansing in the Bosnian War
- Rape during the Bosnian War
- War crimes in the Kosovo War
