= Massacres of Albanians in World War I =

Killings of Albanian civilians during the First World War

- Part of World War I, war crimes in World War I, and Yugoslav colonization of Kosovo
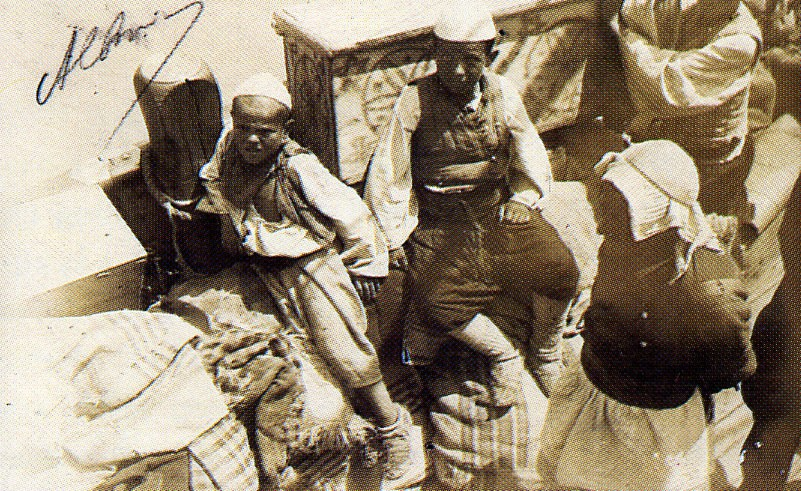
- Young Albanian refugees on a boat in 1914
- Location: Principality of Albania, Kosovo, Vardar Macedonia
- Date: 1914–1918
- Target: Albanians
- Attack type: Massacres, arson, starvation, forced migration, ethnic cleansing
- Deaths: Contemporary Albanian claim: Total: 250,000+ killed: 200,000 killed by Serbia and Montenegro (1913–15); 50,000 killed by Bulgaria (1915–18); 85,676–100,000+ killed in Kosovo (1913–21); Other estimates: c. 70,000 in Albania alone (including combatants); c. 150,000 died of starvation in Albania in 1915 alone (Contemporary Red Cross estimate)
- Victims: 330,000 homeless by November 1915; 20,000 refugees from Korça
- Perpetrators: Kingdom of Serbia, Kingdom of Montenegro, Kingdom of Bulgaria, Kingdom of Greece
- Motive: Anti-Albanian sentiment, Islamophobia, Greater Serbia, Greater Bulgaria, Megali Idea

Throughout World War I, a series of war crimes were committed by Serbian, Montenegrin, Greek and Bulgarian troops against the Albanian civilian population of Albania, Macedonia and Kosovo. These atrocities followed the previous massacres and ethnic cleansing of Albanian civilians committed during the Balkan Wars. In 1915, Serbian troops enacted a scorched-earth policy in Kosovo, massacring tens of thousands of Albanians. Between 1912 and 1915, 132 Albanian villages were razed to the ground.

Many Albanians in the region of Kičevo were killed by Bulgarian forces between 1915-1918. In 1916, many Albanians in Štrpce and Načallnik starved to death or became sick as a result of Bulgarian soldiers seizing the villagers' wheat, which led to a man-made famine. The number of Albanians (including combatants) that were killed or died during WWI due to diseases and warfare in Albania is estimated to be around 70,000, approximately 8.75% to 10% of the country's population. Additionally, contemporary estimates from the American Red Cross suggest that 150,000 died of starvation in Albania during 1915 alone. In a letter to King George V, the Committee of Kosovo claimed in 1919 that the Serbian and Montenegrin armies had killed 200,000 Albanians since the Balkan Wars, including some 100,000 Albanians killed in Kosovo from 1913 to 1915, and that Bulgarian troops had killed 50,000 Albanians from 1915 to 1918. In 1921, Albanian deputies said that 85,676 Kosovo Albanians were killed since the Balkan Wars.

After the Great War, Albanians in the Kingdom of Yugoslavia were subject to persecution.

== Background ==
During the Balkan Wars, numerous atrocities were committed against the Albanian population in the territories occupied by the Balkan League, typically by Serbian and Montenegrin forces. According to contemporary accounts, around 25,000 Albanians were killed during the first half of the First Balkan War, before violence climaxed. It is estimated that up to 120,000 or more were killed in either Old Serbia or in all areas occupied by the Serbian Army. Additionally, according to Serbian documents, 281,747 Albanians above the age of six were expelled from Old Serbia by late 1914. This figure, however, is disputed and scholars estimate that between 60,000 and 300,000 Albanians were expelled from 1912–1913. The Carnegie Commission characterized the expulsions and massacres as an attempt to transform the ethnic structure of the regions inhabited mostly by Albanians.

== Kosovo ==
=== Bytyçi ===
In 1915, the village of Bytyçi was attacked and the entire Ushki family was nearly eradicated, with only one survivor.

=== Astrazubi ===
In 1914, Serbian troops entered the village of Astrazubi in Malisheva and burned down 1,029 houses and killed 227 civilians, mostly women and children, although the number is believed to be higher according to Albanian sources. In the village of Banjë, the wounded were buried alive.

=== Gjilan ===
In 1914 Serbian troops committed many atrocities in Gjilan.

=== Kamenica ===
During the Serbian armys retreat, the soldiers set fire to Kamenica, Selac, Gradec and Vranisht, after having slaughtered a number of peasants and carried off the women. On November 1, 1915, the soldiers placed two pieces of light artillery two hundred paces from the village of Vecali, on the Tetovo-Prizren road, and set fire to the village with these pieces of artillery, killing nearly 65 men, women and children. The rest of the peasants managed to flee. Before the bombardment of the village, the peasants had given bread to the Serbian soldiers.

=== Peja ===
In the region of Peja in 1914, Serbian troops would execute roughly 25 Albanian civilians daily.

=== Vitia ===
In the village of Lubishtë, Serbian troops massacred 104 men, as well as 24 men in Gjylekar. In Lubishtë, the head of the Bakiya family, the old grandmother in the Metushi family and two children of the Emin family were burned alive.

== Vardar Macedonia ==
=== Tetovo ===
In 1915, a young Albanian boy shot a Serbian soldier in the village of Dërbëcë in Tetovo. The Serbian army demanded that the village hand him over. The villagers refused which resulted in the entire village being massacred.

=== Bitola ===
According to Justin McCarthy, in 1915 Serbian and Bulgarian forces entered the region of Bitola, in Kičevo and Kruševo in Bitola, and burned between 19-36 villages. 503 men, 27 women and 25 children were killed, and 600 houses burned down.

== Principality of Albania ==
According to an article in the Boston Daily Globe, published on November 8, 1915, the Serbo-Montenegrin troops shot or bayonetted 20,000 Albanian women and children and destroyed 300 villages and 35,000 houses, leaving 330,000 people without asylum. Additionally, during the conflict between Albanians and Greeks in southern Albania during 1914–1915, where Greek forces took advantage of the political instability of Albania and attempted to annex as much Albanian territory into Greece as possible or succeed in creating the Autonomous Republic of Northern Epirus, at least 145 Albanian villages in southern Albania were looted and destroyed. Accompanying this was the destruction of 48 Bektashi teqes at the hands of the Greek forces. In total, 80 per cent of the teqes in Albania were either extremely damaged or destroyed entirely during 1914–1915.

=== Shkodër ===
In November 1915, Montenegrin troops murdered Albanian intellectuals and patriots. Others were captured and sent to Cetinje and executed. Among the martyrs were publicist Moustafa Hilmi Leskoviki, head of the Albanian paper "Kombi".

=== Gjirokastër ===
The Greek army withdrew from the area after the recognition of the Albanian independence and the delineation of the border. A provisional government of Autonomous Republic of Northern Epirus was established in February 1914 and organized armed units who clashed with the Albanian militia. They were composed both Orthodox Albanian and Greek-speaking males aged from 15 to 55 and consisted mainly by deserters of the Greek army, many of them natives and bandits. As such the area was subject to a vicious cycle of arson and looting and towns like Tepelenë, Leskovik and Frashër and many villages were burnt down completely. This devastation was accompanied by the massacre of a large part the population, especially the Muslim part.

==== Hormova ====
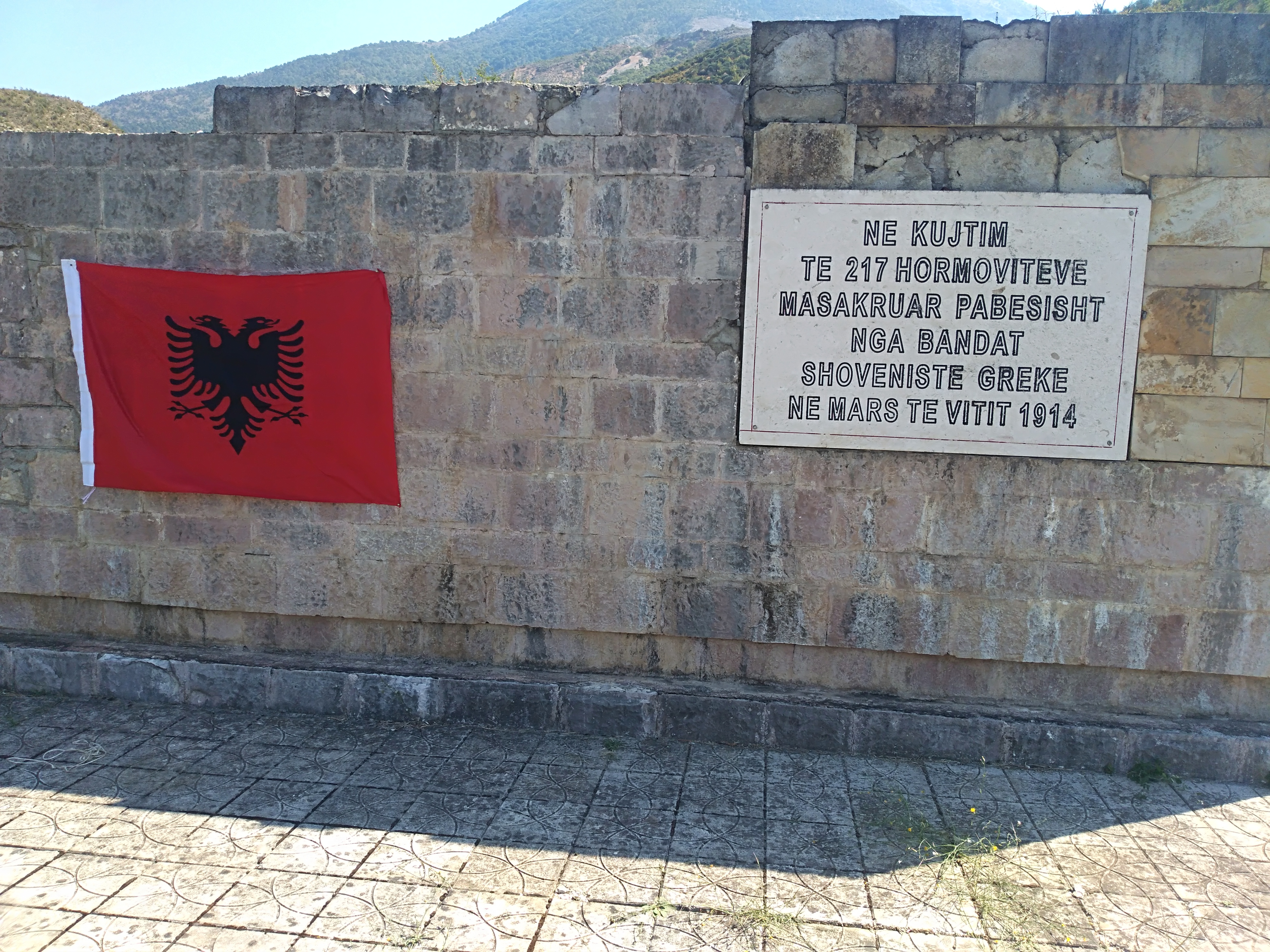
The memorial for the men massacred in Hormova by Greek forces in 1914

On April 29, 1914, Greek troops massacred 217 men and boys from Hormovë inside the premises of the monastery of Saint Mary in the neighboring village of Kodra.

=== Korça region ===
Before the First World War, in 1914 based on reports by journalist and Albanian national activist Kristo Dako in May 1914 Greek forces committed atrocities in the district of Korçë. According to him hundreds of Muslim homes were destroyed and removed the Albanian Christian population from multiple villages. In the process, many civilians were massacred, including Christians. Roughly 20,000 refugees were created in and around Korçë.

After Greek military groups entered Korçë in 1914 under the guise of desertion, they began to loot the shops and homes of Muslim Albanians, as well as committing murders and rapes; Albanian armed groups, including that of Kajo Babjeni, immediately responded by resuming their military activities and eventually forced the Greeks to retreat from the city. After the French army occupied Korçë on 18 October 1916, local Albanian leaders including Sali Butka, Themistokli Gërmenji and Kajo Babjeni coordinated their efforts and took measures to protect against the further fragmentation of Albanian lands; they created the Committee of Defense (Komiteti i Mbrojtjes), surrounded the city with their forces and began negotiations with the French that ultimately culminated in the creation of the Autonomous Province of Korçë.

== Aftermath ==
In 1920, Hasan Prishtina collected information about the atrocities committed on the Albanian civil population by the Serbian troops in 1918-1920. He reported this to the British government that 20,000 men and 1,500 women were massacred, as well as 168 villages razed to the ground, with 4,769 houses burned down.

In 1918, Serbian forces entered Albanian villages with the intent of disarming them resulting in a number of villages being burned. As a result, more atrocities were committed between 1918-1941 by the Kingdom of Yugoslavia against the Albanian population.

== See also ==
- Albania during the Balkan Wars
- Anti-Albanian sentiment
- Massacres of Albanians in the Balkan Wars
- Yugoslav colonization of Kosovo
- World War I
- Balkan Wars
- World War I in Albania

== Sources ==
- Nicholson, Beryl (2013). "Accommodating the internally displaced in south-central Albania in 1918". New Issues in Refugee Research. UNHCR.
