= Albania during the Balkan Wars =

- Part of Balkan Wars
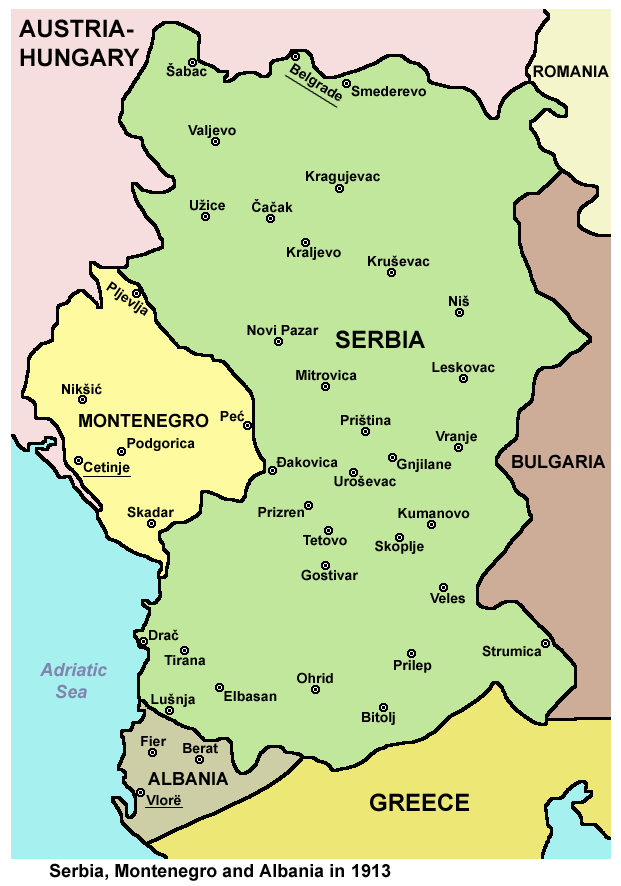
Date	8 October 1912 – 21 February 1914
Location	Kosovo vilayet, Scutari vilayet, Janina vilayet, Manastir vilayet

Independent Albania was proclaimed on 28 November 1912. This chapter of Albanian history was shrouded in controversy and conflict as the larger part of the self-proclaimed region had found itself controlled by the Balkan League states: Serbia, Montenegro and Greece from the time of the declaration until the period of recognition when Albania relinquished many of the lands originally included in the declared state. Since the proclamation of the state in November 1912, the Provisional Government of Albania asserted its control over a small part of central Albania including the important cities of Vlorë and Berat.

== Provisional Government of Albania ==
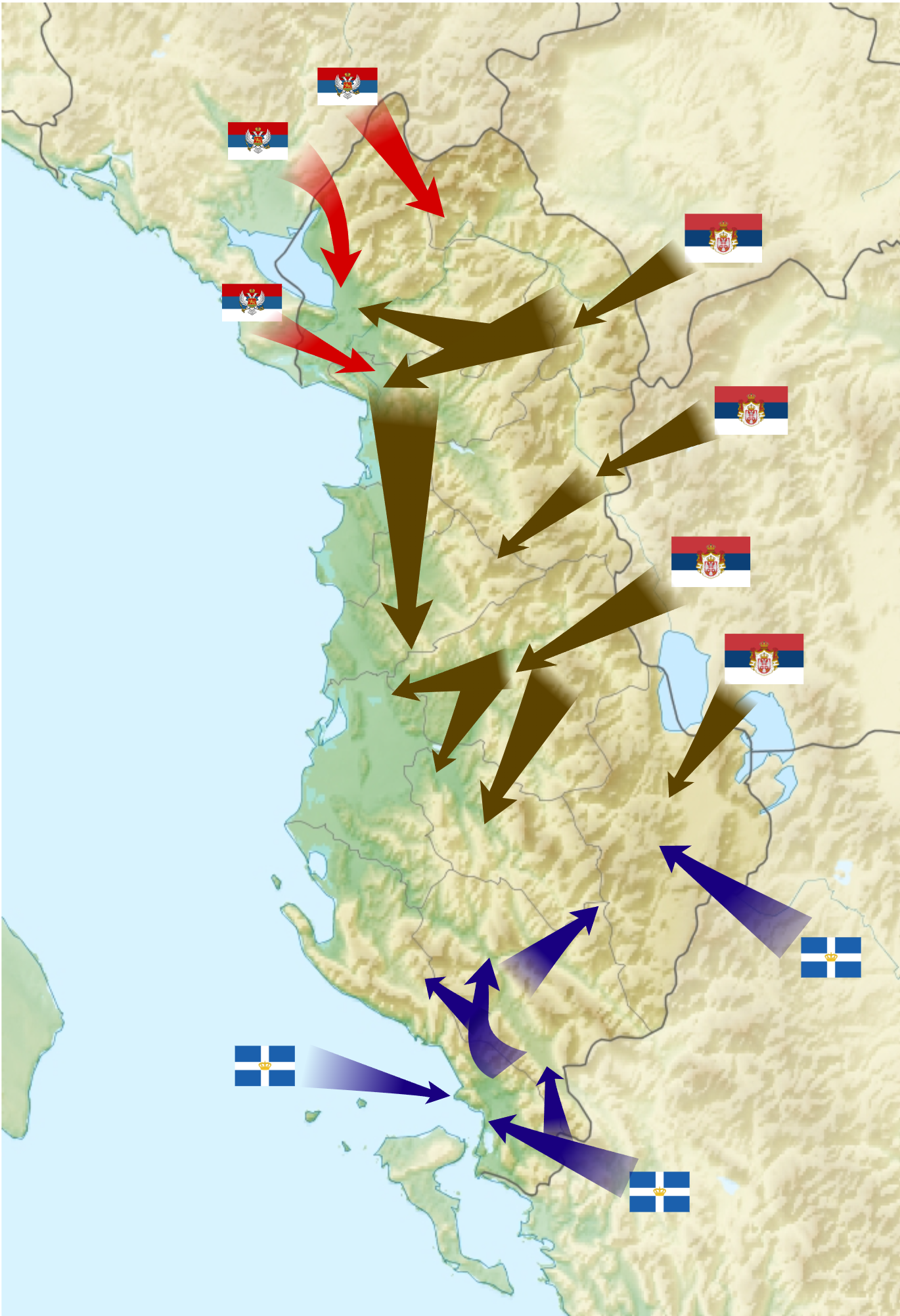
Allied military operations in Albania, 1912: Serbia Montenegro Greece

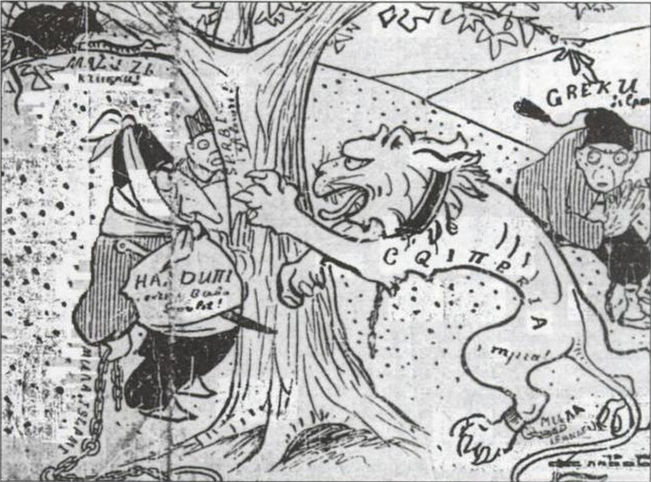
Caricature shows Albania (the lion) breaks the chain of Islam that linked it to the Turk (man with the fez, left) and Orthodoxy that bound it to the Greek (man with hat and tassel, right). In background a Serbian (man wearing šajkača behind tree, centre left) and Montenegrin (represented as black rat in tree branches, top left) preparing to ambush the lion

1912 was to be an eventful year in Rumelia. From August, the Ottoman Government recognised the autonomy of Albania. In October 1912, the Balkan states, following their own national aspirations jointly attacked the Ottoman Empire and during the next few months partitioned nearly all of Rumelia, the Ottoman territories in Europe, including those inhabited by the Albanians. In November, with the outbreak of the First Balkan War, the Albanians rose up and declared independence of Albania.

== Conflicts of the Balkan Wars in Albania ==
=== Serbian campaign ===
The Serb army first entered Ottoman territory inhabited by ethnic Albanians in October 1912 as part of its campaign in the then-ongoing First Balkan War. The Kingdom of Serbia occupied most of the Albanian-inhabited lands including Albania's Adriatic coast. Serbian Gen. Božidar Janković was the Commander of the Serbian Third Army during the military campaign in Albania. The Serbian army met with strong Albanian guerrilla resistance, led by Isa Boletini, Azem Galica and other military leaders. During the Serbian occupation, Gen. Jankovic forced notables and local tribal leaders to sign a declaration of gratitude to King Petar I Karađorđević for their "liberation by the Serbian army".

The army of the Kingdom of Serbia captured Durrës on 29 November 1912 without any resistance. Right after their arrival in Durrës, on 29 November 1912, the Kingdom of Serbia established Drač County, its district offices and appointed the governor of the county, mayor of the city and commander of the military garrison.

During the occupation, the Serbian army committed numerous crimes against the Albanian population "with a view to the entire transformation of the ethnic character of these regions." The Serbian government denied reports of war crimes.

Following the signing of the Treaty of London in May 1913 which awarded new lands to Serbia, including most of the former Vilayet of Kosovo, the Serbian government agreed to withdraw its troops from outside of its newly expanded territory. This allowed an Albanian state to exist peacefully. The final withdrawal of Serb personnel from Albania was in October 1913.

=== Montenegrin campaign ===
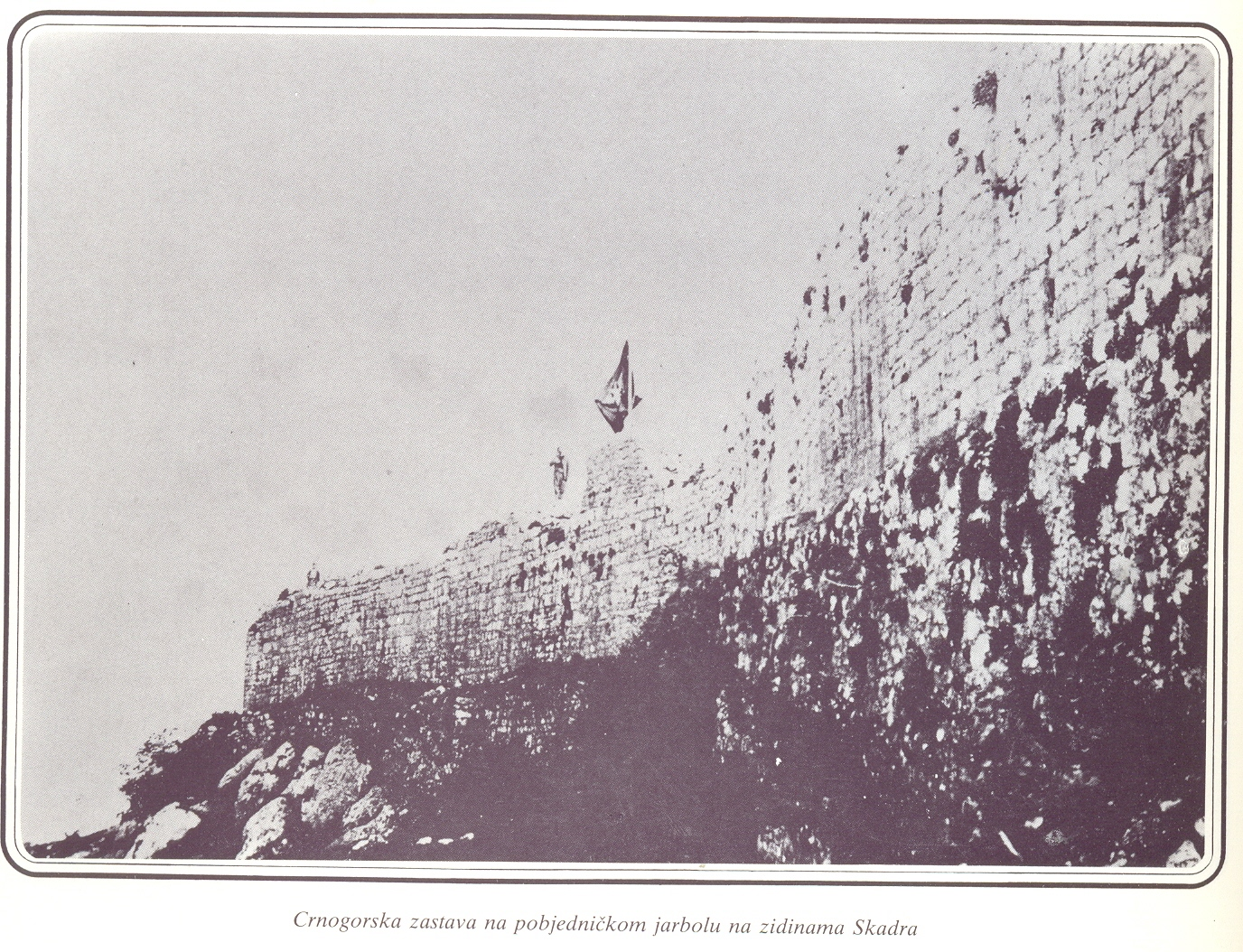
Montenegrin flag on Shkoder fortress.

Shkodër and its surrounding had long been desired by Montenegro, although its inhabitants were overwhelmingly ethnic Albanians. The Siege of Scutari took place on 23 April 1913 between the allied forces of Montenegro and Serbia against the forces of the Ottoman Empire and the Provisional Government of Albania.

Montenegro took Shkodër on 23 April 1913, but when the war was over, the Great Powers didn't give the city to the Kingdom of Montenegro, which was compelled to evacuate it in May 1913, in accordance with the London Conference of Ambassadors. The army's withdrawal was hastened by a small naval flotilla of British and Italian gunboats that moved up the Buna river and across the Adriatic coastline.

=== Greek campaign ===
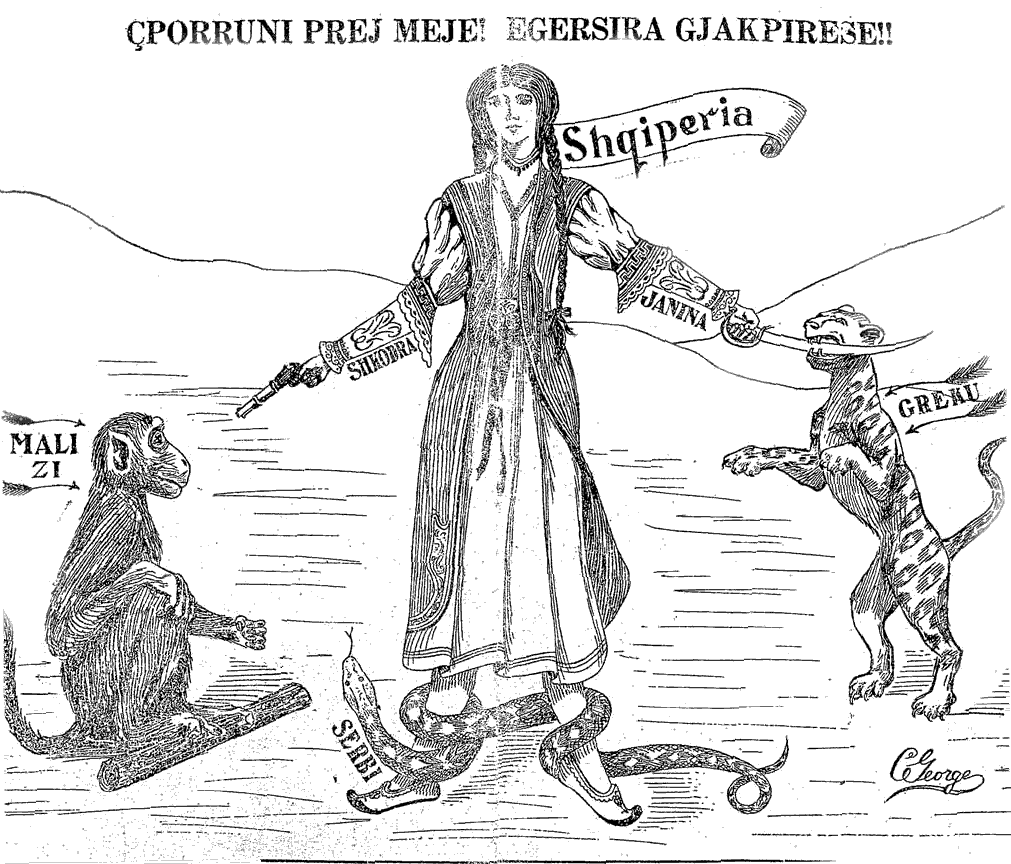
Caricature shows Albania defending itself from neighbouring countries. Montenegro is represented as a monkey, Greece as a leopard and Serbia as a snake. Text in Albanian: "Flee from me! Bloodsucker Beasts!"

The Greek army entered Albania in November 1912 and its advance was met with local resistance from irregulars. The Greek army in southern Albania engaged in harsh reprisals against civilians.

The Greek Army controlled territory that would be later incorporated into the Albanian state before the declaration of Albanian Independence in Vlorë. On 18 November 1912, after a successful uprising and 10 days prior to the Albanian Declaration of Independence, local Maj. Spyros Spyromilios expelled the Ottomans from the Himara region. The Greek Navy also shelled the city of Vlorë on 3 December 1912. The Greek Army didn't capture Vlorë, which was of great interest to Italy.

Greek forces were stationed in what would become southern Albania until March 1914. After the Great Powers agreed on the terms of the Protocol of Florence in December 1913, Greece was forced to retreat from the towns of Korçë, Gjirokastër and Sarandë and the surrounding territories.

== Aftermath ==
Under strong international pressure, Albania's Balkan neighbours were forced to withdraw from the territory of the internationally recognised state of Albania in 1913. The new Principality of Albania included only about half of the ethnic Albanian population, while a large number of Albanians remained in neighbouring countries.

== Sources ==
- Hall, Richard C. (2002). The Balkan Wars 1912-1913: Prelude to the First World War. Routledge. pp. 46–47. ISBN 978-1-134-58363-8.

== See also ==
- Albanian National Revival
- Massacres of Albanians in the Balkan Wars
- Autonomous Republic of Northern Epirus
- Siege of Shkoder
