= Hubert Crackanthorpe =

British writer

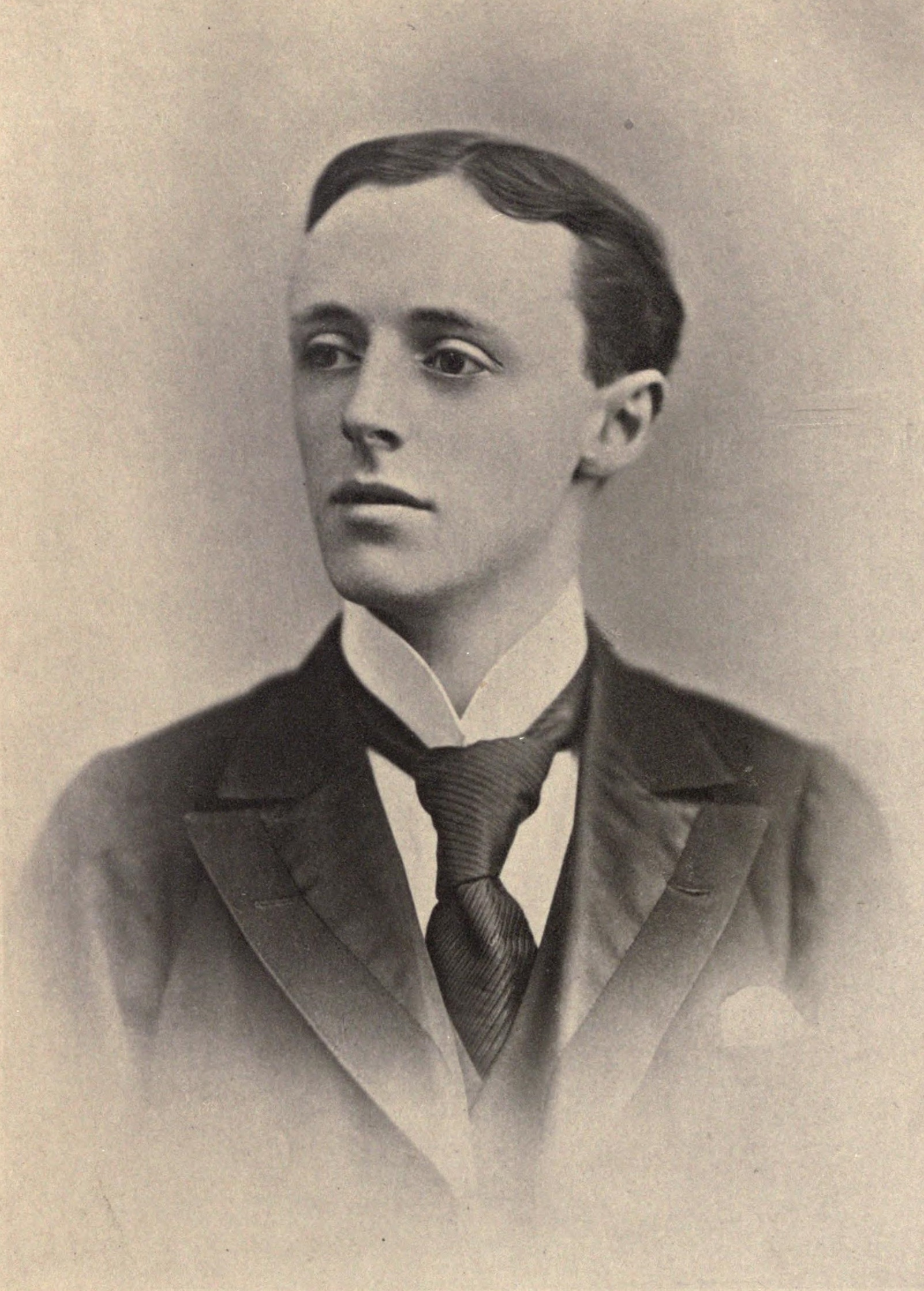
- Born: Hubert Montague Crackanthorpe; 12 May 1870; London, England
- Died: November 1896 (aged 26); Seine, France
- Occupations: Novelist, short story writer
- Writing career
- Genre: Naturalism

Signature
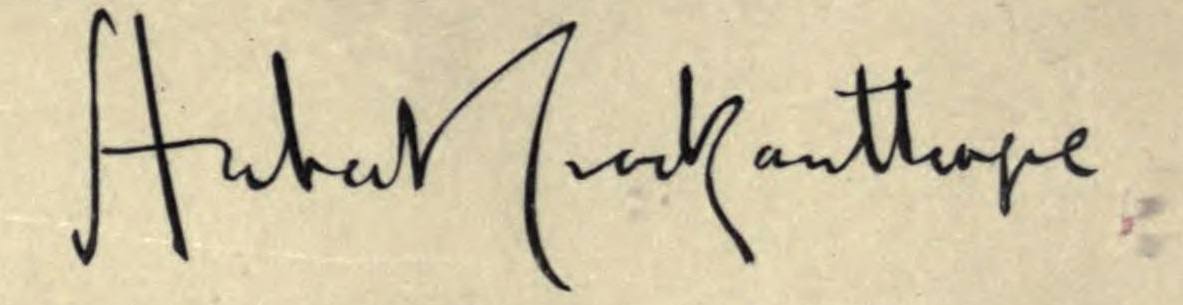

Hubert Montague Crackanthorpe (12 May 1870 – c. November 1896) was a late Victorian British writer who created works mainly in the genres of the essay, short story, and novella. He also wrote limited amounts of literary criticism. After his early death under mysterious circumstances, his name is now little known and has all but vanished from conventional literary biographies of the period. Crackanthorpe is usually associated with the literary movement of naturalism. His literary legacy consists largely of three volumes of short stories he managed to publish during his lifetime; contemporary opinions of his talent as a writer varied widely, though one of his works was published with an appreciation by Henry James.

== Private life ==
Crackanthorpe was born to Montague Hughes Cookson, later Crackanthorpe (1832–1913), and his wife, Blanche Althea Elizabeth, née Holt (died 1928). Montague Cookson took the name Crackanthorpe by Royal Licence in 1888 on inheriting the Crackanthorpe estate through his grandmother Dorothy Crackanthorpe, who was also grandmother to William and Dorothy Wordsworth.

In 1893 Hubert Crackanthorpe married Leila Macdonald, another writer. The couple shared a literary life in Chelsea and France and travelled together from France to Italy, reaching the Amalfi Coast (Salerno) but the journey ended with a litigation. Leila was financially prosperous and soon came into a large inheritance. However, the temperamental Crackanthorpes were ill-suited for the institution of marriage, and they separated in 1896, although they were again living together in Paris at the time of Crackanthorpe's death.

== Literary work ==
Crackanthorpe began his literary career as editor, with W. H. Wilkins, of a periodical entitled The Albemarle. Over the years, Crackanthorpe has been associated with another avant-garde literary magazine, The Yellow Book; Some of the pieces Crackanthorpe published in the Yellow Book were collected in Sentimental Studies and a Set of Village Tales (1895). After its publication, Crackanthorpe continued to publish short stories in various periodicals.

Crackanthorpe's literary technique is reminiscent of his contemporary, Guy de Maupassant. They both shared a passion for detailed psychological portraits. Crackanthorpe had a talent for describing scenes in a style rich with substance and texture. To create an additional layer of realism, some of Crackanthorpe's characters speak in rural British dialects.

== The mystery of his passing ==
The state of Crackanthorpe's marriage to Leila began to disintegrate rapidly after 1895. Leila miscarried in 1896 because of a venereal infection she contracted from Hubert; soon after, she left Hubert and travelled to Italy. Left to his own philandering devices, Hubert promptly began an affair with a woman named Sissie Welch, sister of Richard Le Gallienne. After a few months, Hubert managed a reconciliation with Leila. Leila was now living in Paris with a lover of her own. Hubert and Leila set up house once more with their respective lovers in tow. This complicated domestic arrangement did not last long, and Leila left Hubert on 4 November 1896.

Hubert Crackanthorpe was never seen alive again after his wife left him for the second time. Leila walked out the door of the Crackanthorpes' Paris home and boarded a boat for London in December 1896. Hubert's body was found in the Seine on Christmas Eve. It is unknown whether he was a victim of foul play, or if he succumbed to a suicidal impulse. In subsequent years the aristocratic Crackanthorpe family was eager to keep the story of Hubert Crackanthorpe from coming to public attention.

Critics tend to group Crackanthorpe together with a clutch of young British writers and artists of the 1890s who suffered untimely deaths caused by various factors, including suicide, alcohol abuse or tuberculosis; e.g. Oscar Wilde, Ernest Dowson, Lionel Johnson, and the two editors of the Yellow Book, Aubrey Beardsley and Henry Harland.

== Works ==
- Wreckage: Seven Studies (London: Heinemann, 1893; New York: Cassell, 1894).
- Sentimental Studies and a Set of Village Tales (London: Heinemann, 1895; New York: Putnam, 1895).
- Vignettes: A Miniature Journal of Whim and Sentiment (London & New York: John Lane, 1896; New York: Bruno Chapbooks, 1915).
- Last Studies (London: Heinemann, 1897).
- The Light Sovereign: A Farcical Comedy in Three Acts (London: Harland, 1917).
- Collected Stories, 1893–1897 (Gainesville, Fla.: Scholars Facsimiles and Reprints, 1969).
