= Serbia in the Balkan Wars =

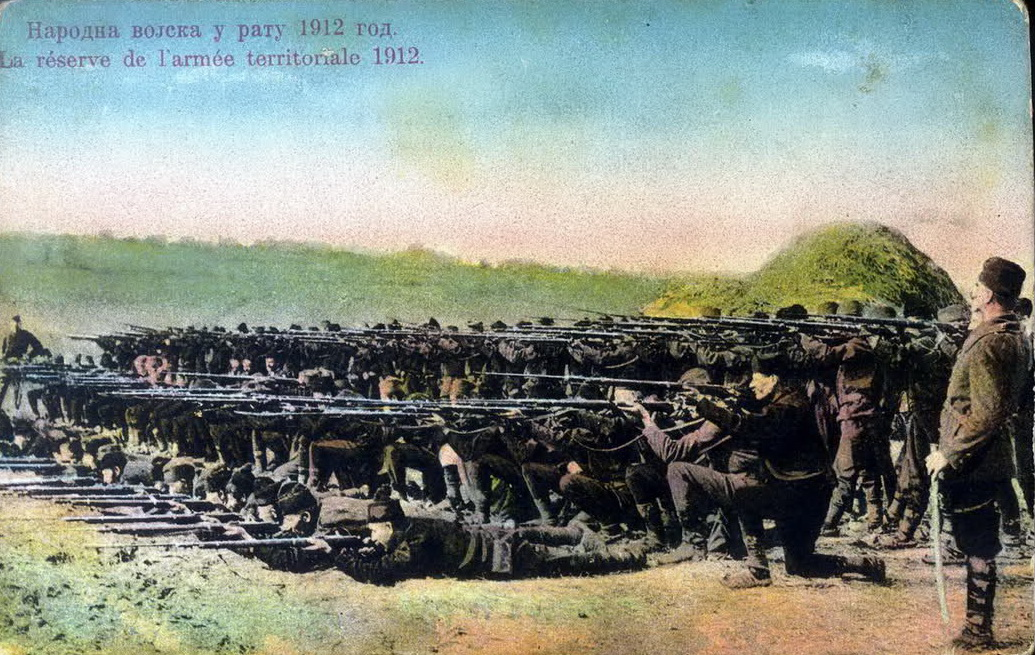
The Serbian National Army during the First Balkan War.

The Kingdom of Serbia was one of the major parties in the two Balkan Wars (8 October 1912–18 July 1913), gaining significant territorial gains in the Central Balkans in both conflicts, nearly doubling its territory.

During the First Balkan War, most of the Kosovo Vilayet was taken by Serbia, while parts of the region of Metohija were taken by the Kingdom of Montenegro, a close ally. Over the centuries, populations of ethnic Serbs and Albanians tended to shift following territorial handovers. As a result of the multi-ethnic composition of Kosovo, the new administration provoked a mixed response from the local population. The ethnic Albanian population did not welcome Serbian rule and many were forced to flee the country. Kosovo Vilayet was agreed to be incorporated into Serbia and northern Metohija was agreed to be incorporated into Montenegro at the Treaty of London in May 1913.

Disagreements regarding the territory of Macedonia among the members of the Balkan League led to the Second Balkan War, during which Serbia, Greece, Romania, Montenegro, and the Ottomans fought against Bulgaria in 1913. The new borders were ratified at the Treaty of Bucharest the same year. Serbia gained control over the land known as Vardar Macedonia (present-day North Macedonia). In 1918, Serbia became part of the Kingdom of Serbs, Croats, and Slovenes, renamed Yugoslavia in 1929.

== Background ==
=== Balkan League ===
Following Italy's victory in the Italo-Turkish War (29 September 1911 – 18 October 1912), the Young Turks fell from power after a coup. The Balkan countries saw this as an opportunity to attack the Ottoman Empire and expand their empire.

With the initial support of Russian agents, a series of agreements were reached between Serbia and Bulgaria in March 1912. Military victory against the Ottoman Empire would not be possible while the empire could enlist reinforcements from Asia. The condition of the Ottoman railways at the time was unusable, so most reinforcement would have to come by ship through the Aegean Sea. Greece was the only Balkan country with a navy powerful enough to deny the use of the Aegean to the Ottoman Empire, thus a treaty between Greece and Bulgaria became necessary; it was signed in May 1912. Montenegro concluded agreements between Serbia and Bulgaria later that year. While refusing to enter into any such deal with Greece, Bulgaria negotiated treaties with Serbia to partition the area of northern Macedonia. According to Bulgarian strategy, the agreement would restrict Serbia's access to Macedonia while allowing Bulgaria to unilaterally capture as much as its troops could without regard to Greek interests. Bulgaria thought it could occupy the larger part of Aegean Macedonia and the important port city of Salonika before the Greeks could get there. This alliance between Greece, Serbia, Bulgaria, and Montenegro became known as the Balkan League; its existence was undesirable for all the Great Powers.

The League was loose at best, though secret liaison officers were exchanged between the Greek and the Serbian army after the war began. Greece delayed the start of the war several times in the summer of 1912 to better prepare her navy, but Montenegro declared war on 8 October (25 September O.S.). Following an ultimatum for the Ottoman Empire, the remaining alliance members entered the conflict on 17 October.

== First Balkan War ==
- First Balkan War (1912–1913)
  - Battle of Kumanovo
  - Battle of Prilep
  - Battle of Bitola
  - Siege of Adrianople
  - Siege of Scutari

The Serbian forces operated against the major part of the Ottoman Western army which was located in the areas of Novi Pazar, Kosovo, and northern and eastern Macedonia. Strategically the Serbian forces were divided into four independent armies and groups: Javor brigade and Ibar Army against Ottoman forces in the area of Novi Pazar, Third Army against Ottoman forces in the areas of Kosovo and Metohija, First Army against Ottoman forces in the area of northern Macedonia and Second Army (operating from the Bulgarian territory) against Ottoman forces in the area of eastern Macedonia. The decisive battle was expected to be fought in the area of northern Macedonia, more specifically in the plains of Ovče Pole, where the main forces of Ottoman Vardar Army were expected to concentrate.

According to the plan of the Serbian Supreme Command, three Serbian armies (First, Second and Third) were supposed to encircle and destroy the Vardar Army in that area, with First Army advancing from the north (direction of Vranje-Kumanovo-Ovče Pole), Second Army advancing from the east (direction Kriva Palanka-Kratovo-Ovče Pole) and Third Army advancing from the north-west (direction Priština-Skopje-Ovče Pole). In the execution of this plan, the main role was given to the First Army while Second Army was expected to cut off the Vardar Army's retreat route, and if necessary attack its rear and right flank. The main goal of the Third Army was to take Kosovo and Metohija and if necessary assist the First Army by attacking the Vardar Army's left flank and rear. Ibar Army and the Javor brigade had a minor role in the Serbian plan, they were expected to secure the Sanjak of Novi Pazar and replace the Third Army in Kosovo after advancing farther south.

The Serbian Army under General (later Marshal) Putnik dealt three decisive victories in Vardar Macedonia, its primary objective in the war, effectively destroying the Ottoman forces in the region and conquering northern Macedonia. They also helped the Montenegrins to take the Sandžak and sent two divisions to help the Bulgarians at the siege of Edirne.

The last battle for Macedonia was the battle of Monastir, in which the remains of the Ottoman Vardar Army were forced to retreat to central Albania. After the battle, Prime Minister Pasic asked Gen. Putnik to take part in the race for Thessaloniki. Putnik declined and instead turned his army to the west, towards Albania, foreseeing that a future confrontation between the Greeks and Bulgarians over Thessaloniki could greatly help Serbia's plans over Vardar Macedonia.

After the Great Powers applied pressure on them, the Serbs started to withdraw from northern Albania and the Sandžak, although they left behind their heavy artillery park to help the Montenegrins in the continuing siege of Shkodër. On 23 April 1913 Scutari's garrison was forced to surrender due to starvation.

=== Adrianople ===
Serbian artillery at siege.

The failure of the Şarköy-Bulair operation and the deployment of the 2nd Serbian Army together with its much-needed heavy siege artillery sealed Adrianoples fate. On 11 March, after a two weeks bombardment that destroyed many fortified structures around the city, the final assault started with Allied forces enjoying a crushing superiority over the Ottoman garrison. Under the command of General Nikola Ivanov, the Bulgarian 2nd Army with 106,425 men and two Serb divisions with 47,275 men conquered the city, with the Bulgarians suffering 8,093 and the Serbs 1,462 casualties. The Ottoman casualties for the entire Adrianople campaign reached 23,000 killed. The Ottoman Empire began the war with 61,250 men in the Adrianople fortress. Richard Hall notes that 60,000 men were captured. Adding to the 33,000 killed, the Turkish historians note that 28,500-man survived captivity leaving only 10,000 men unaccounted for as possibly captured (including the unspecified number of wounded). Bulgarian losses for the entire Adrianople campaign amounted to 7,682. This was the last and decisive battle that was necessary for a quick end to the war, even though it is speculated that the fortress would have fallen eventually due to starvation. The most important result was that now the Ottoman command lost all hopes of regaining the initiative, which made any further fighting pointless.

== Second Balkan War ==
- Second Balkan War
  - Battle of Bregalnica
  - Battle of Pirot
  - Battle of Kalimanci
  - Battle of Vidin

The Siege of Adrianople (1912–13) had major and key results in Serbian-Bulgarian relations, planting the seeds of the two countries' confrontation some months later. The Bulgarian censor rigorously cut any references about the Serbian participation in the operation in the telegrams of the foreign correspondents. Public opinion in Sofia thus failed to realize the crucial services Serbia rendered in the battle. Accordingly, the Serbs claimed that their troops of the 20th Regiment were those who captured the Ottoman commander of the city and that Colonel Gavrilović was the allied officer who accepted Shukri's official surrender of the garrison, a statement that the Bulgarians disputed. Subsequently, the Serbs officially protested, pointing out that although they had sent their troops to Adrianople to win for Bulgaria's territory whose acquisition had never been foreseen by their mutual treaty, the Bulgarians had never fulfilled the clause of the treaty requiring Bulgaria to send 100,000 men to help the Serbians on their Vardar front. The Bulgarians answered that their staff had informed the Serbs about that on 23 August.

The friction escalated some weeks later when the Bulgarian delegates in London bluntly warned the Serbs that they must not expect Bulgarian support on their Adriatic claims. The Serbs angrily replied that that was a clear withdrawal from the prewar agreement of mutual understanding according to the Kriva Palanka-Adriatic line of expansion, but the Bulgarians insisted that in their view, the Vardar Macedonian part of the agreement remained active and the Serbs were still obliged to surrender the area as agreed. The Serbs accused the Bulgarians of maximalism, pointing out that if they lost northern Albania and Vardar Macedonia, their participation in the common war would have been virtually for nothing. The tension soon was expressed in a series of hostile incidents between the two armies along their common line of occupation across the Vardar valley. The developments essentially ended the Serbian-Bulgarian alliance and made a future war between the two countries inevitable.

== Austro-Hungarian propaganda and alleged Serbian atrocities ==
Austro-Hungarian propaganda spread news of alleged atrocities of the Serbian army in Albania and Macedonia against the Muslim population, which led to an international commission enquiring the situation, which found no illegal behavior of Serbian troops. The Austro-Hungarian consulate in Belgrade issued a statement that Albanians in Serbian-held territory were "very satisfied", as opposed to Albanians in Montenegrin-controlled territory. The Austro-Hungarian consulate in St. Petersburg confirmed this in March 1913, with "The Serbs are not to blame for the violence in the new regions, but the Montenegrins". The German consulate in Thessaloniki reported on mass atrocities conducted by Bulgarian and Greek troops against Muslims, but reported no such thing regarding Serbian troops. Norwegian observers described Serbian–Montenegrin treatment of civilians as positive, and challenged Austro-Hungarian propaganda and false claims that were disseminated in European press. Other journalists, present on the ground, such as a German correspondent to Spanish ABC and Leipziger Nachrichten, correspondents to French journal L'Illustration, the Swedish Läkartidningen, Aftonbladet, Stockholms Dagblad, the Russian press, and letters and diaries of foreigners assigned to hospitals, make no claims of Serbian atrocities, but on the contrary, observed Albanian misdeeds in the past and present.

The Prochaska Affair, false reports of the mistreatment or killing of an Austro-Hungarian consul in Prizren in November 1912, shook public opinion in Austria-Hungary. Leo Freundlich, the compiler of news articles into Albania's Golgotha, did not travel Albania nor Albanian-inhabited territory until 1915, and the claims in the work are unverified. None of the Austro-Hungarian press challenged the accuracy of reports on atrocities in the Balkan Wars.

== Albanians and the Albanian state ==
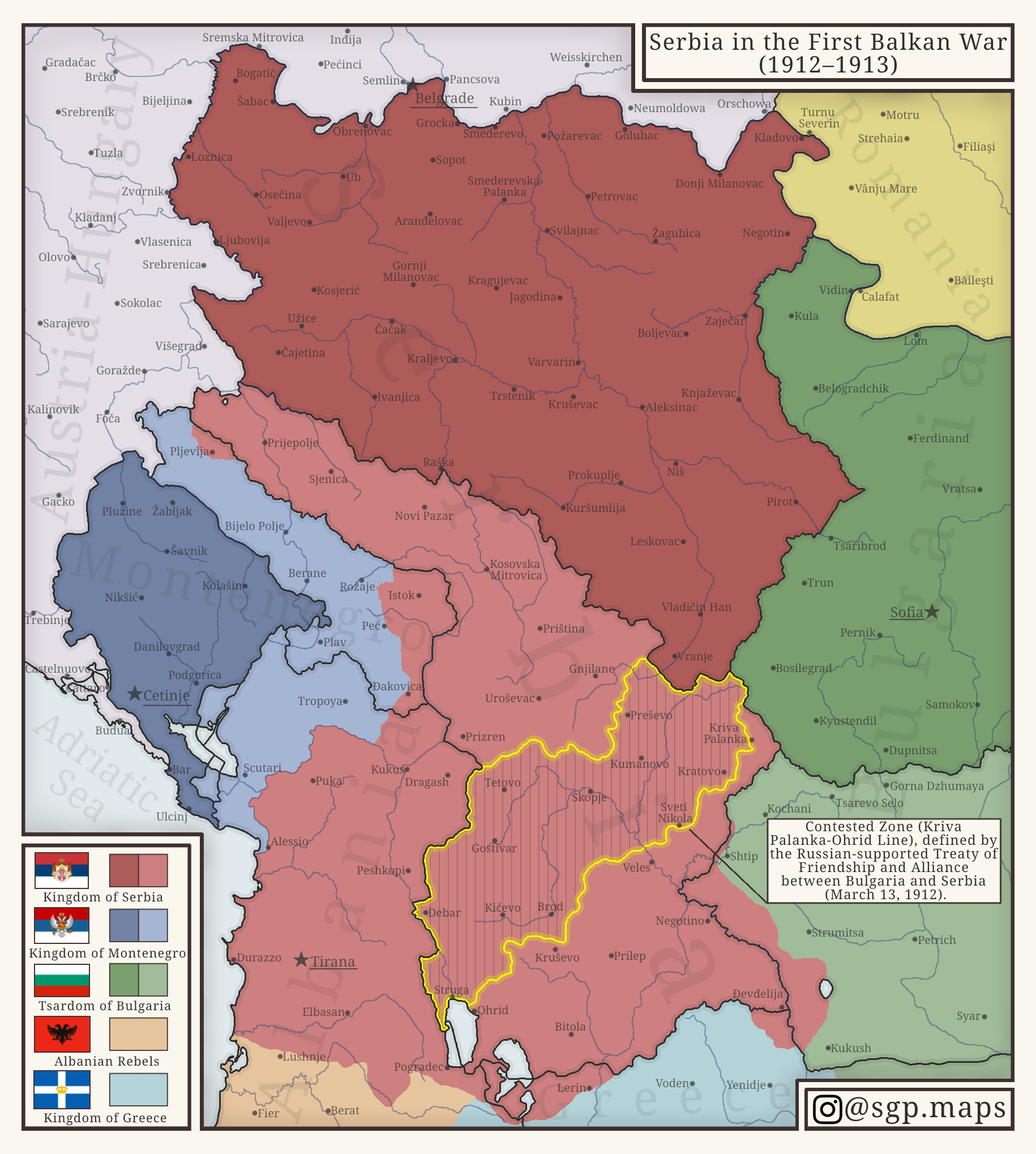
Serbian conquest 1912–1913

The Serbian campaign on present-day Albanian territory (then still officially Ottoman Empire) took place during the First Balkan War and lasted from November 1912 to October 1913. At the dawn of the Balkan wars, Serbia had aspirations of reclaiming historic Serbian territory beyond its southern border, which was called Old Serbia, as well as acquiring access to the Adriatic Sea in part of the Albanian coastline for economic and vital interest.

Before the outbreak of the First Balkan War, the Albanian nation was fighting for a national state. In 1912, with the outbreak of the First Balkan War, the Albanians in central Albania rose up and declared the creation of an independent Albania, which was to include today's Albania and the Vilayet of Kosovo. At the end of 1912, after the Porte recognised the autonomy of Albania, the Balkan League (comprising three neighboring states: Serbia, Montenegro, and Greece; along with Bulgaria) jointly attacked the Ottoman Empire and during the next few months partitioned Ottoman territory, including also territory inhabited by Albanians. On the eve of the war, Serbian propaganda had implemented a strong anti-Albanian campaign. At the end of 1912, the Kingdom of Serbia occupied most Albanian-populated territory to the Adriatic coast. The army of Montenegro was present around Shkodër. During attempts to annex northern Albania, Serbian and Montenegrin armies allegedly committed numerous crimes against the local Albanian population. To investigate the crimes, the Carnegie Endowment for International Peace (CEIP) formed a special commission, which was sent to the Balkans in 1913.

Serbia had occupied most of the Albanian–claimed lands. Serbian general Božidar Janković was the Commander of the Serbian Third Army during the military campaign in Kosovo. The Serbian army met strong Muslim Albanian guerrilla resistance, led by Isa Boletini, Azem Galica and others. Janković forced local tribal leaders and notables to sign a declaration of gratitude to King Petar I Karađorđević admitting to "Liberation by the Serbian army". During the campaign, the Serbian army allegedly committed numerous crimes against the Albanian population "with a view to the entire transformation of the ethnic character of these regions.", according to the CEIP.

The number of victims in the Kosovo Vilayet under Serbian control in the first few months was estimated at 25,000 people. The Serbian government denied reports on war crimes. After this war, Kosovo was part of the Kingdom of Serbia.

=== Crimes ===
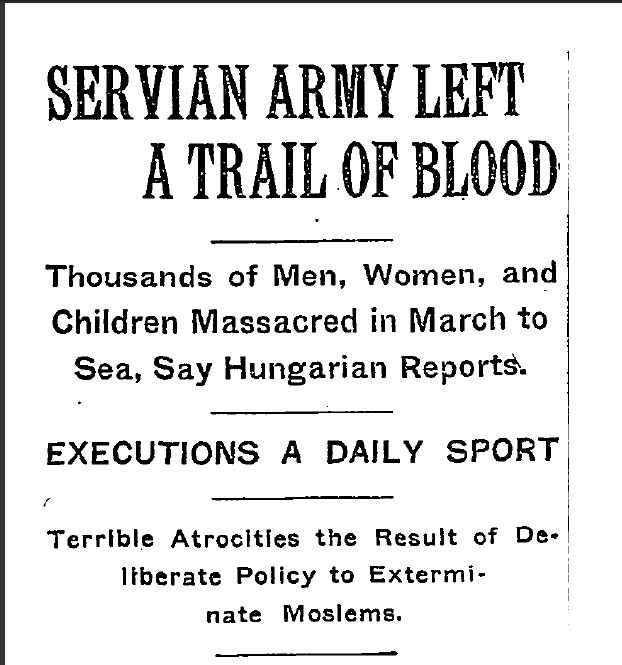
The New York Times, 31 December 1912.

After the Luma massacre, the Daily Telegraph reported the following: "All the horrors of history have been outdone by the atrocious conduct of the troops of General Janković". The Serbian government has officially denied reports of war crimes. A series of massacres were committed by the Serbian and Montenegrin Army and paramilitaries, according to international reports. During the First Balkan War of 1912–13, Serbia and Montenegro – after expelling the Ottoman forces in present-day Albania and Kosovo – committed numerous war crimes against the Albanian population, which were reported by the European, American and Serbian opposition press. In order to investigate the crimes, the Carnegie Endowment for International Peace formed a special commission, which was sent to the Balkans in 1913. Summing the situation in Albanian areas, Commission concludes:

The goal of the expulsions and massacres of ethnic Albanians was a statistic manipulation before the London Ambassadors Conference which was to decide on the new Balkan borders. The number of victims in the Vilayet of Kosovo under Serbian control in the first few months was estimated at 25,000 people. The highest estimated number of casualties during the occupation in all the areas under Serbian control was about 120,000 Albanians.

During the attack of Serbian army on Pristina in October 1912, the Ottoman Albanians (led by Turkish officers) abused the white flag on the city fortress, tricking the Serbian army and in this way killed many Serbian soldiers, upon which a "brutal retaliation" followed. The number of Albanians of Pristina killed in the early days of the Serbian government was estimated at 5,000 by Albanian Catholic archbishop Lazër Mjeda. The local Albanians of Ferizoviç resisted the Serbian takeover and fought for three days, and upon defeat were ordered to surrender arms, upon which 300–400 of them were killed. Following that, Albanian villages around Ferizoviç were destroyed. After the annexation of the city to the Kingdom of Serbia, the city name was changed to Uroševac, after Stephen Uroš V of Serbia.

Yakova (present-day Đakovica or Gjakova) was mentioned among the cities that suffered at the hands of the Serbian-Montenegrin armies. The New York Times reported that people on the gallows hung on both sides of the road, and that the way to Yakova became a "gallows alley." In the region of Yakova, the Montenegrin military-police unit Gendarmerie Corps (Kraljevski žandarmerijski kor, known as krilaši), committed many abuses and violence against the Albanian population.

According to Kosovo Albanian historian Zef Mirdita, Serbian priests carried out violent conversions of Albanian Catholics to Serbian Orthodoxy, with the Vienna Neue Freie Presse (20 March 1913) reported that Orthodox priests with the help of military force converted 300 Catholics into Orthodoxy, and that Franciscan priest Angelus, who refused to renounce his faith, was tortured and then killed with bayonets. The History Institute in Pristina has claimed that Montenegrin bishops converted over 1,700 Albanian Catholics into Orthodoxy in the area of Yakova in March 1913.

After the Serbian army achieved control over the city of Prizren, it imposed repressive measures against the Albanian civilian population. Serbian detachments broke into houses, plundered, committed acts of violence, and killed indiscriminately. Around 400 people were "eradicated" in the first days of the Serbian military administration. During those days bodies were lying everywhere on the streets. According to witnesses, during those days around Prizren lay about 1,500 corpses of Albanians. Foreign reporters were not allowed to go to Prizren. After the operations of the Serbian military and paramilitary units, Prizren became one of the most devastated cities of the Kosovo vilayet and people called it "the Kingdom of Death". Eventually, General Božidar Janković forced surviving Albanian leaders of Prizren to sign a statement of gratitude to the Serbian king Peter I Karađorđević for their liberation. It is estimated that 5,000 Albanians were massacred in the area of Prizren.

When General Janković saw that the Albanians of Luma would not allow Serbian forces to continue the advance to the Adriatic Sea, he ordered the troops to continue their brutality. The Serbian army massacred an entire population of men, women and children, not sparing anyone, and burned 27 villages in the area of Luma. Reports spoke of the atrocities by the Serbian army, including the burning of women and children related to the stack of hay, within the sight of fathers. Subsequently, about 400 men from Luma surrendered to Serbian authorities, but were taken to Prizren, where they were murdered. The Daily Telegraph wrote that "all the horrors of history have been outdone by the atrocious conduct of the troops of General Janković". The second Luma massacre was committed the following year (1913). After the London Ambassador Conference decided that Luma should be within the Albanian state, the Serbian army initially refused to withdraw. Albanians raised a great rebellion in September 1913, after which Luma once again suffered harsh retaliation from the Serbian army. In December 1913, the official report was sent to the Great Powers with details of the slaughter of Albanians in Luma and Debar executed after the proclamation of the amnesty by Serbian authorities. The report listed the names of people killed by Serbian units in addition to the causes of death: such as by burning, slaughtering, bayoneting, or other methods. The report also provided a detailed list of the burned and looted villages in the area of Luma and Has.

=== Consequence ===
Under strong international pressure, Balkan neighbors in 1913 were forced to withdraw from the territory of the internationally recognized state of Albania. The new Principality of Albania included about half of the ethnic Albans, while a large number of Albanians remained in neighboring countries. These events greatly contributed to the growth of the Serbian-Albanian conflict:

The Treaty of London (which oversaw the creation of an independent Albania) awarded Kosovo to Serbia and the region was immediately subjected to military governance. According to the Report of the International Commission on the Balkan Wars, Serbia would not extend constitutional privileges to annexed territories. Newly acquired territories were subjected to military dictatorship, and were not included in the Serbian constitutional system. The opposition press demanded the rule of law for the population of the annexed territories and the extension of the constitution of the Kingdom of Serbia to these regions.

We have carried out the attempted premeditated murder of an entire nation. We were caught in that criminal act and have been obstructed. Now we have to suffer the punishment.... In the Balkan Wars, Serbia not only doubled its territory, but also its external enemies.

— Dimitrije Tucović

As a result of the Treaty of London in 1913, which legally awarded the former Ottoman lands to Serbia, Montenegro and Greece, an independent Albania was recognised. As such, Greece, Serbia and Montenegro agreed to withdraw from the territory of the new Principality of Albania.

== Macedonia ==
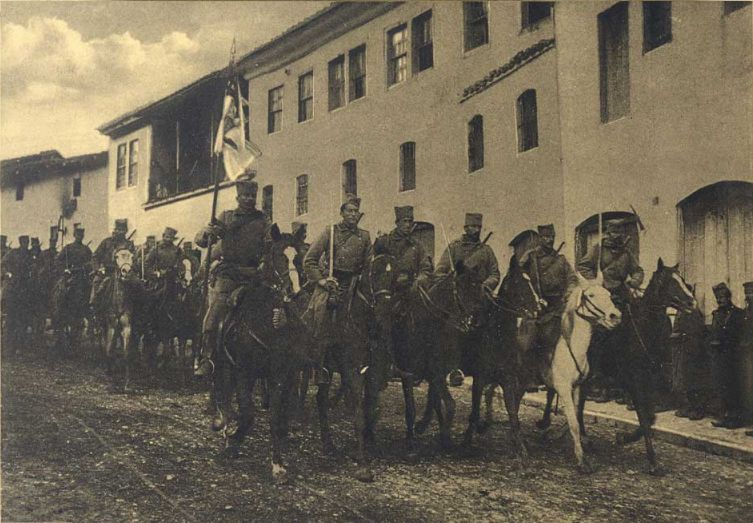
Serbian cavalry entering Skopje.

Immediately after the annexation of Vardar Macedonia to the Kingdom of Serbia, the Slavic population of Macedonia were faced with a policy of forced Serbianisation. According to the CEIP (1914), those who declared themselves to be Bulgarians were tortured, imprisoned or deported to Bulgaria. The worst crimes were committed by the Serbian secret military organization "Black Hand". Serbian authorities carried out ethnic cleansing within the policy that whosoever calls himself a Bulgarian must betake himself to Bulgaria. Many of the high clergy of Bulgarian Orthodox Church were expelled: Cosmas of Debar (Bishop), Axentius of Bitola (Archbishop), Neophytus of Skopje, Meletius of Veles, Boris of Ohrid and others, as well as prominent Bulgarian individuals and teachers from Skopje. The CEIP concluded that the Serbian state started a wide sociological experiment of "assimilation through terror" in Macedonia .

== Denial ==
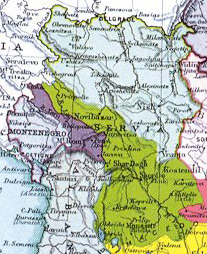
Territorial expansion of Serbia after the Balkan Wars.

Specific denials related to Balkan Wars have included:

Such atrocities alleged to have been perpetrated by the Serbian Army are simply unthinkable today on the part of a people who are exceptionally religious and tolerant.

— Serbian Press Office 8 February 1913

During the Balkan Wars, the Serbian government has countered most reports of Serbian Army atrocities with official denials. Writing about Serbian war crimes denials in 1913, Austrian socialist Leo Freundlich stated that "such grave and detailed accusations cannot be repudiated by a simple statement that the events in question did not occur". He concluded that different international reports from various sources have more weight in any court of human justice than all the formal denials issued by the Serbian Press Office.

Most modern-day Serbian history books do not mention Serbia's intention to annex the Albanian coast.

== See also ==
- Albania during the Balkan Wars

== Sources ==
Books

- Cvijić, Jovan (1912). Balkanski rat i srbija [The Balkan War and Serbia]. Belgrade: Državna štamparija.
- Lazarević, Milutin D. (1955). Drugi Balkanski rat [Second Balkan War]. Vojno delo.
- Skoko, Savo (1975). Drugi balkanski rat 1913: Tok i završetak rata. Vojnoistorijski institut.
- Popović, Dimitrije; Bataković, Dušan T.; Popović, Bogdan Lj. (1993). Balkanski ratovi 1912/1913. Srpska književna zadruga. ISBN 9788637903772.
- Ratković, Borislav (1975). Prvi balkanski rat 1912-1913: Operacije srpskih snaga [First Balkan War 1912-1913: Operations of Serbian forces]. Istorijski institut JNA. Belgrade: Vojnoistorijski institut.
- Ratković, Borislav; Đurišić, Mitar; Skoko, Savo (1972). Srbija i Crna Gora u balkanskim ratovima 1912-1913 [Serbia and Montenegro in the Balkan Wars 1912-1913]. Beogradski izdavačko-grafički zavod.
- Rudić, Srđan; Milkić, Miljan (2013). Balkanski ratovi 1912-1913: Nova viđenja i tumačenja [The Balkan Wars 1912/1913: New Views and Interpretations]. Istorijski institut, Institut za strategijska istrazivanja. ISBN 978-86-7743-103-7.
- Tomić, Jaša (1913). Rat u Maćedoniji i Staroj Srbiji 1913. godine [War in Macedonia and Old Serbia in 1913]. Električna štamparija.
- Зафиров, Димитър (2007). История на българите в осем тома. TRUD Publishers. ISBN 978-954-528-752-7.
- Vladimir Stojančević (1991). Prvi balkanski rat: okrugli sto povodom 75. godišnjice 1912-1987, 28. i 29. oktobar 1987. Srpska akademija nauka i umetnosti. ISBN 9788670251427.
- Balkanski rat u slici i reči. Jovanović i sin. 1990. ISBN 978-86-7671-002-7.
- Небојша Дамљановић; Vera Zdravković (2012). Слике рата: балкански ратови 1912-1913. године на разгледницама у Историјском музеју Србије. Istorijski Muzej Srbije. ISBN 978-86-82925-53-8.
- Andrija P. Jovićević; Bratimir Garić (1996). Dnevnik iz balkanskih ratova. Službeni list SRJ. ISBN 9788635502793.
- Silvija Đurić (1990). Dnevnik pobeda: Srbija u balkanskim ratovima, 1912-13. ИРО Београд. ISBN 9788675190028.
- "Ratne slike sa Balkana. 1, Srpska vojska osvaja Kosovo i Prištinu". Novi Sad: S. F. Ognjanović. 1913.
- Seton-Watson, Robert William (1966). The Rise of Nationality in the Balkans. H. Fertig. ISBN 9785877993853.

Journals

- Životić, Aleksandar. "Srpski gerilski odredi na prostoru stare Srbije 1911–1912." Zbornik radova Instituta za savremenu istoriju 09 (2007): 119–136.
- Stermenski, Jelena Paunovic, and Danko Leovac. "Approaching the Balkan Wars: Serbian Society and the Ottoman Empire."

Reports

- Carnegie Endowment for International Peace. Division of Intercourse and Education (1914). "Report of the International Commission to Inquire into the Causes and Conduct of the Balkan War". Washington D.C.: The Endowment.

Symposia

- Vojvodić, Mihailo, ed. (2015), Први балкански рат 1912-1913: историјски процеси и проблеми у светлости стогодишњег искуства [Historical processes and problems in the light of the centennial experience], Belgrade: SANU
