= Humoral immunity =

Aspect of immunity

Humoral immunity is the aspect of immunity that is mediated by macromolecules—including secreted antibodies, complement proteins, and certain antimicrobial peptides—located in extracellular fluids. Humoral immunity is named so because it involves substances found in the humors, or body fluids. It contrasts with cell-mediated immunity. Humoral immunity is also referred to as antibody-mediated immunity.

The study of the molecular and cellular components that form the immune system, including their function and interaction, is the central science of immunology. The immune system is divided into a more primitive innate immune system and an acquired or adaptive immune system in vertebrates, both of which contain humoral and cellular immune elements.

Humoral immunity refers to antibody production and the coinciding processes that accompany it, including: Th2 activation and cytokine production, germinal center formation and isotype switching, and affinity maturation and memory cell generation. It also refers to the effector functions of antibodies, which include pathogen and toxin neutralization, classical complement activation, and opsonin promotion of phagocytosis and pathogen elimination.

== History ==
The concept of humoral immunity developed based on the analysis of antibacterial activity of the serum components. Hans Buchner is credited with the development of the humoral theory. In 1890, Buchner described alexins as "protective substances" that exist in the blood serum and other bodily fluids and are capable of killing microorganisms. Alexins, later redefined as "complements" by Paul Ehrlich, were shown to be the soluble components of the innate response that leads to a combination of cellular and humoral immunity. This discovery helped to bridge the features of innate and acquired immunity.

Following the 1888 discovery of the bacteria that cause diphtheria and tetanus, Emil von Behring and Kitasato Shibasaburō showed that disease need not be caused by microorganisms themselves. They discovered that cell-free filtrates were sufficient to cause disease. In 1890, filtrates of diphtheria, later named diphtheria toxins, were used to vaccinate animals in an attempt to demonstrate that immunized serum contained an antitoxin that could neutralize the activity of the toxin and could transfer immunity to non-immune animals. In 1897, Paul Ehrlich showed that antibodies form against the plant toxins ricin and abrin, and proposed that these antibodies are responsible for immunity. Ehrlich, with his colleague von Behring, went on to develop the diphtheria antitoxin, which became the first major success of modern immunotherapy. The discovery of specified compatible antibodies became a major tool in the standardization of immunity and the identification of lingering infections.

Major discoveries in the study of humoral immunity
Substance	Activity	Discovery
Alexin(s)/Complement(s)	Soluble components in the serum that are capable of killing microorganisms	Buchner (1890), Ehrlich (1892)
Antitoxins	Substances in the serum that can neutralize the activity of toxins, enabling passive immunization	von Behring and Shibasaburō (1890)
Bacteriolysins	Serum substances that work with the complement proteins to induce bacterial lysis	Richard Pfeiffer (1895)
Bacterial agglutinins and precipitins	Serum substances that aggregate bacteria and precipitate bacterial toxins	von Gruber and Durham (1896), Kraus (1897)
Hemolysins	Serum substances that work with complements to lyse red blood cells	Jules Bordet (1899)
Opsonins	Serum substances that coat the outer membrane of foreign substances and enhance the rate of phagocytosis by macrophages	Wright and Douglas (1903)
Antibody	Original discovery (1900), antigen-antibody binding hypothesis (1938), produced by B cells (1948), structure (1972), immunoglobulin genes (1976)	Ehrlich

== Antibodies ==
Antibodies or immunoglobulins are glycoproteins found within blood and lymph. Structurally, antibodies are large Y-shaped globular proteins. In mammals, there are five types of antibodies: immunoglobulin A, immunoglobulin D, immunoglobulin E, immunoglobulin G, and immunoglobulin M. Each immunoglobulin class differs in its biological properties and has evolved to deal with different antigens. Antibodies are synthesized and secreted by plasma cells that are derived from the B cells of the immune system.

An antibody is used by the acquired immune system to identify and neutralize foreign objects like bacteria and viruses. Each antibody recognizes a specific antigen unique to its target. By binding their specific antigens, antibodies can cause agglutination and precipitation of antibody-antigen products, prime for phagocytosis by macrophages and other cells, block viral receptors, and stimulate other immune responses, such as the complement pathway.

An incompatible blood transfusion causes a transfusion reaction, which is mediated by the humoral immune response. This type of reaction, called an acute hemolytic reaction, results in the rapid destruction (hemolysis) of the donor red blood cells by host antibodies. The cause is usually a clerical error, such as the wrong unit of blood being given to the wrong patient. The symptoms are fever and chills, sometimes with back pain and pink or red urine (hemoglobinuria). The major complication is that hemoglobin released by the destruction of red blood cells can cause acute kidney failure.

== Antibody production ==
In the humoral immune response, the naive B cells begin the maturation process in the bone marrow, gaining B-cell receptors (BCRs) along the cell surface. These BCRs are membrane-bound protein complexes that have a high binding affinity for specific antigens; this specificity is derived from the amino acid sequence of the heavy and light polypeptide chains that constitute the variable region of the BCR. Once a BCR interacts with an antigen, it creates a binding signal which directs the B cell to produce a unique antibody that only binds with that antigen. The mature B cells then migrate from the bone marrow to the lymph nodes or other organs of the lymphatic system, where they begin to encounter pathogens.

Step 1: A macrophage engulfs the pathogen. Step 2: The macrophage then digests the bacterium and presents the pathogen's antigens. Step 3: A T helper cell binds to the macrophage and becomes an activated T helper cell. Step 4: The activated T helper cell binds to a B cell in order to activate the B cell. Step 5: When the B cells are activated, some B cells turn into plasma cells and are released into the blood, while other B cells become B memory cells that quicken the response to a second exposure. Step 6: Plasma cells then secrete antibodies, which bind to antigens to fight the invading pathogens.

=== B cell activation ===
When a B cell encounters an antigen, a signal is activated, the antigen binds to the receptor, and is taken inside the B cell by endocytosis. The antigen is processed and presented on the B cell's surface again by MHC class II (MHC-II) proteins. The MHC-II proteins are recognized by T helper cells (T_{h} cells), which stimulate the production of proteins, allowing B cells to multiply and their descendants to differentiate into antibody-secreting cells circulating in the blood. B cells can be activated through certain microbial agents without the help of T cells and have the ability to work directly with antigens to respond to pathogens present.

=== B cell proliferation ===
The B cell waits for a T_{h} cell to bind to the complex. This binding will activate the T_{h} cell, which then releases cytokines that induce B cells to divide rapidly, making thousands of identical clones of the B cell. These daughter cells either become plasma cells or memory B cells. The memory B cells remain inactive here; later, upon reinfection with the same antigen, they divide to form plasma cells. On the other hand, the plasma cells produce a large number of antibodies which are released freely into the circulatory system.

=== Antibody-antigen reaction ===
These antibodies will encounter antigens and bind with them. This will either interfere with the chemical interaction between host and foreign cells or may form bridges between their antigenic sites, hindering their proper functioning. Their presence might also attract macrophages or killer cells to attack and phagocytose them.

== Complement system ==
The complement system is a biochemical cascade of the innate immune system that helps clear pathogens from an organism. It is derived from many small blood plasma proteins that work together to disrupt the target cell's plasma membrane, leading to cytolysis of the cell. The complement system consists of more than 35 soluble and cell-bound proteins, 12 of which are directly involved in the complement pathways. The complement system is involved in the activities of both innate immunity and acquired immunity.

Activation of this system leads to cytolysis, chemotaxis, opsonization, immune clearance, inflammation, and the marking of pathogens for phagocytosis. The proteins account for 5% of the blood serum globulin fraction. Most of these proteins circulate as zymogens, which are inactive until proteolytic cleavage.

Three biochemical pathways activate the complement system: the classical complement pathway, the alternate complement pathway, and the mannose-binding lectin pathway. These processes differ only in the process of activating C3-convertase, which is the initial step of complement activation, and the subsequent process are eventually the same.

The classical pathway is initiated through exposure to free-floating antigen-bound antibodies. This leads to enzymatic cleavage of smaller complement subunits, which assemble to form the C3-convertase.

B cell activation is a large part of the humoral immune response.

This differs from the mannose-binding lectin pathway, which is initiated by bacterial carbohydrate motifs, such as mannose, on bacterial surfaces. After the binding process, the same subunit cleavage and synthesis occur as in the classical pathway. The alternate complement pathway completely diverges from the previous pathways, as it spontaneously initiates in the presence of hydrolyzed C3, which then recruits other subunits that can be cleaved to form C3-convertase. In all three pathways, once C3-convertase is synthesized, complement components are cleaved into subunits that either form a structure called the membrane attack complex (MAC) on the bacterial cell wall to destroy the bacteria or act as cytokines and chemokines, amplifying the immune response.

== See also ==
- Cell-mediated immunity (vs. humoral immunity)
- Immune system
- Polyclonal response
- Serology
