= Albanophilia =

Love of Albanian culture, language or people

Flag of Albania

Albanophilia is a non-Albanian person's expression of a strong interest in or appreciation for the Albanian language, Albanian culture, Albanian literature, Albanian history or the Albanian people.

== Albanophilia in Europe outside of the Balkans ==
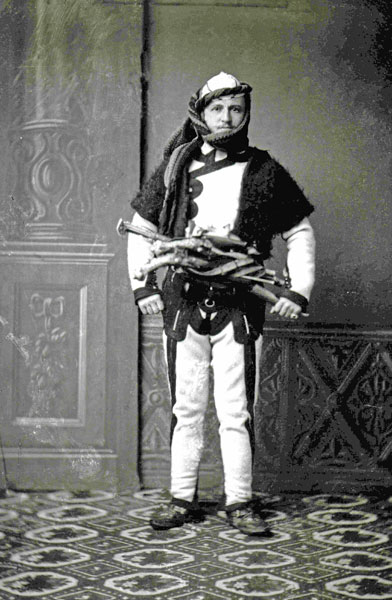
Austrian Theodor Ippen in Shkodër with traditional costume (1900)

=== Sweden ===
Johann Erich Thunmann in the 18th century supported the theory of the autochthony of the Albanians and also presented the Illyrian origin theory. Later on Gustav Meyer proved that Albanian language was part of the Indo-European family.

=== Germany ===
In 2001 during the Insurgency in Macedonia the German foreign minister Joschka Fischer declared, that the Albanian question in the Balkans is not solved. Around 1912 Germany and Austria supported an Independent Albania, including cities like Parga, Tetovo and Pristina.

== Albanophilia in Balkans ==
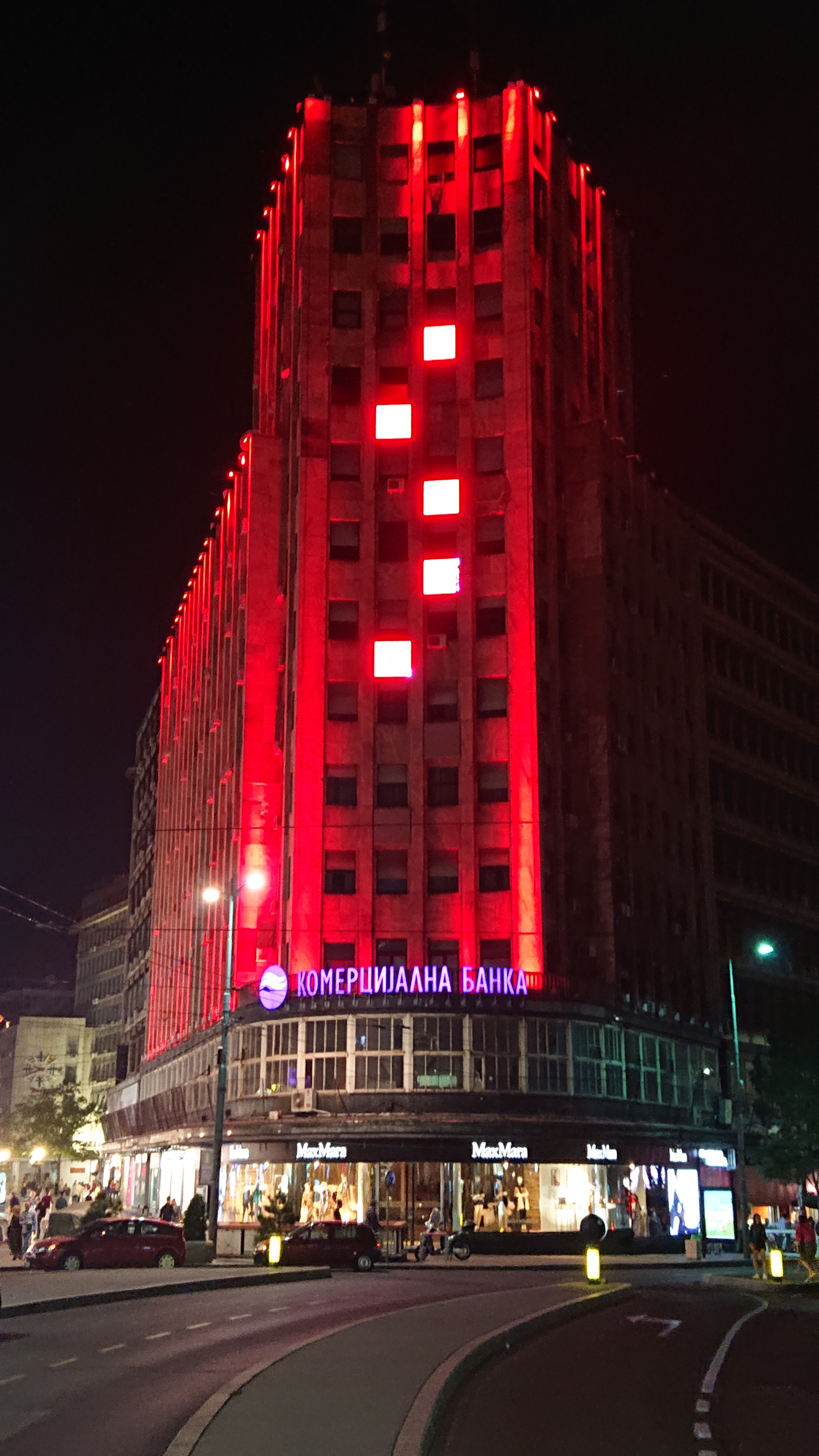
Palace Albanija in Belgrade by night

=== Montenegro ===
The Montenegrin Federalist Party was the only party in Montenegro which promoted common Illyrian theory with Albanians. The party's theoretician, Sekula Drljević, promoted ideas of a separate Montenegrin ethnicity (ideas that become more extreme throughout the 1930s), arguing that the Montenegrins were Illyrian. He wrote:

Races are communities of blood, whereas people are creatures of history. With their language, the Montenegrin people belong to the Slavic linguistic community. By their blood, however, they belong [to the Dinaric peoples]. According to the contemporary science of European races, [Dinaric] peoples are descended from the Illyrians. Hence, not just the kinship, but the identity of certain cultural forms among the Dinaric peoples, all the way from Albanians to South Tyroleans, who are Germanized Illyrians.

== Notable Albanophiles ==
- Lord Byron - British poet and adventurer
- Bob Dole - American politician and army officer
- Edith Durham – British artist and anthropologist
- Robert Elsie - Canadian scholar
- Eliot Engel - American politician
- Joschka Fischer - German politician
- Leo Freundlich – Austrian novelist and writer of Albania's Golgotha
- Margaret Hasluck - Scottish archaeologist
- Aubrey Herbert - British soldier and traveller
- Harry Hodgkinson - British journalist
- Norbert Jokl - Austrian Albanologist
- Vangelis Liapis - Greek scholar and folklorist
- Stipe Mesić – Croatian politician
- Marko Miljanov - Montenegrin general and writer
- Vladimir Oryol - Russian professor
- Theodoros Pangalos - Greek politician
- Carl Patsch - Austrian historian
- Holger Pedersen - Danish linguist
- Milan Šufflay – Croatian historian and politician
- Johann Erich Thunmann - Swedish linguist and historian
- Franz Nopcsa von Felső-Szilvás – Hungarian aristocrat
- Johann Georg von Hahn - German diplomat and philologist
- Gustav von Myrdacz - Austrian nobleman
- Darren Jason Watkins Jr – American YouTuber
- Woodrow Wilson - American president
- Robert Wilton - British author

== Pro-Albanian political parties ==
- Besa Movement
- Democratic Union for Integration
- Democratic Party of Albanians
- Alliance for Albanians
- Party for Democratic Prosperity
- Democratic Party
- Social Democratic Party of Switzerland
- Albanian Alternative
- Party of Democratic Action of Sandžak
- Party for Democratic Action
- Liberal Democratic Party
- Workers' Communist Party
