= Albania's Golgotha =

Leo Freundlich's book from 1913

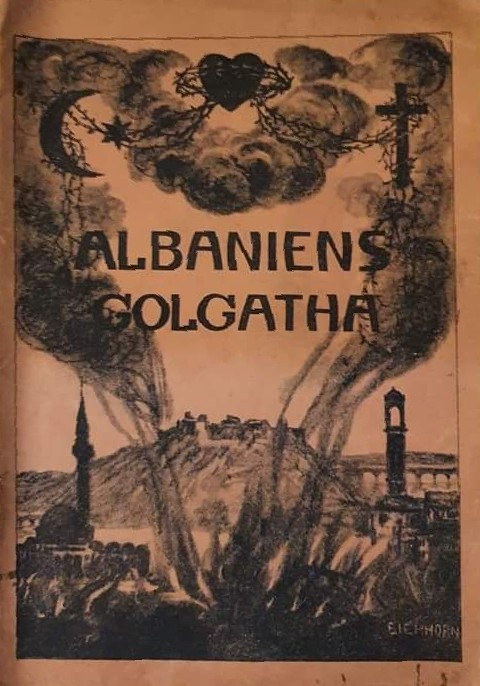
- Front page
- Author: Leo Freundlich
- Original title: Albaniens Golgatha
- Translator: Robert Elsie (2007)
- Language: German
- Subject: Compilation of news articles regarding atrocities on Albanians in the First Balkan War.
- Publisher: Verlag der Buch- und Kunstdruckerei Josef Roller & Co.
- Publication date: 1913
- Publication place: Vienna, Austria-Hungary
- English publication date: 2007 (Elsie)
- Media type: book
- Pages: 32

Albania's Golgotha: Indictment of the Exterminators of the Albanian People (German: Albaniens Golgatha:Anklageakten gegen die Vernichter des Albanervolkes, Albanian: Golgota shqiptare) is a compilation of news articles regarding alleged atrocities against Albanians during the First Balkan War by the Serbian army and Montenegrin army, collected into a 1913 book by Austro-Hungarian publicist and politician Leo Freundlich (1875–1953). The news articles in the book speak of massacres, rape, expulsions, torture and abuse which Albanians suffered under the Serbian–Montenegrin armies and Chetnik paramilitaries.

Freundlich came in contact with Albania for the first time during World War I (1914–1918) as an Austro-Hungarian soldier, in 1915.

== Background ==
Albanian Catholic archbishop of Skopje, Lazër Mjeda, wrote a report dated 24 January 1913 to the Vatican on the Serbian invasion of Kosovo and Macedonia, which included the claim "In the Vilayet of Serb-occupied Kosova alone, the number of dead up to now can, without any exaggeration, be estimated at 25,000".

== Content ==
The book includes a compilation (German: Gesammelt und herausgegeben) by Freundlich of citations from news articles and summaries of reports by war correspondents and Catholic priests.

- Citation from German Frankfurter Zeitung, regarding news reports of "300 unarmed Albanians of the Luma tribe were executed in Prizren without trial", that "it seems to have been regular Serbian troops who committed the massacre" and that "we ourselves were told quite openly by a Serbian official: We are going to wipe out the Albanians."
- Citation from Schiemann in Prussian conservative Kreuzzeitung, claiming "The Serbs, as the article notes, are conducting a war of extermination against the Albanian nation".
- Citation from the Daily Chronicle, "that thousands of Arnauts (Albanians) had been massacred by the Serbs. 2,000 Moslem Arnauts were slaughtered near Skopje and a further 5,000 near Prizren", and similarly, citing Danish war correspondent Fritz Magnussen, "According to officers and soldiers, 3,000 Arnauts were slaughtered in the region between Kumanova / Kumanovo and Skopje and 5,000 near Prishtina", then once again, another summary of "The special correspondent of the Daily Telegraph", claiming "They slaughtered 3,000 people in the region between Kumanova / Kumanovo and Skopje alone. 5,000 Albanians were murdered by the Serbs in the Prishtina area". There was a news piece dubbed "Servian Army left a trail of blood" in the New York Times, dated 31 December 1912, quoting "A Budapest dispatch to The Daily Chronicle ... gathered for the Austro-Hungarian authorities", claims 3,000 Muslims were killed between Kumanovo and Üsküb and another 5,000 Albanians in Pristina.
- Summary of an unnamed war correspondent of Il Messaggero of Rome, of "reported heinous Serbian massacres of Albanians in the vilayet of Kosovo" and complete destruction of many towns and most of inhabitants "slaughtered".
- Summary of an unnamed Catholic priest reporting on 300–400 inhabitants of Ferizaj/Uroševac that were ordered by the Serbian commander to lay down arms and peacefully return, but were massacred, and only half a dozen Muslim families remained in all of the town.
- Summary of a report of Humanité of Paris, submitted to "a consulate in Salonika", describing "plundering, destruction, massacres" by Serbs in Albania, and 31 partially or totally destroyed Albanian-inhabited villages, and guerrilla bands killing all Muslim inhabitants "in all the villages in the districts of Kratovo and Kocani".
- Citation from an unnamed "person whose name and high rank is guarantee enough of the authenticity of the reports" that sent a dossier to Reichspost, that "many Serbian officers and soldiers regarded me as one of theirs. And so it was that a Serbian soldier boasted to me of their attack on an Albanian village near Kumanova/Kumanovo".
- A passage without attribution, claiming:
  - "Eighty-five Albanians were slain in their homes in Tetova/Tetovo ... The heinous deeds committed against the women and girls, including twelve-year-old children, are indescribable". The number of 85 was taken from Lazër Mjeda's report to the Vatican.
  - "Over 1,200 Albanians fell victim to the carnage in Ferizaj/Uroševac". This was taken from Lazër Mjeda's report to the Vatican, that "One Serb told me that 1,200 Albanians were slain there".
  - "The Serbian occupation of Prishtina was even bloodier. The Albanians estimate the number of their dead at 5,000". This was taken from Lazër Mjeda's report to the Vatican.
  - At Prizren, "Up to 400 people perished in the first few days of the Serbian occupation". This was taken from Lazër Mjeda's report to the Vatican.
  - "All in all, twenty-seven villages on Luma territory were burnt to the ground and their inhabitants slain, even the children."
  - "The total number of Albanians slain in the vilayet of Kosovo is estimated at 25,000, a figure which is by no means exaggerated." This was taken from Lazër Mjeda's report to the Vatican.
- Citation from Albanische Korrespondenz (Freundlich's own newspaper), dated 20 March 1913, that "We have received the following report from reliable Albanian sources in Skopje. Serbian troops and volunteers are committing unspeakable atrocities in the vicinity of Skopje" and "These savage troops have committed even worse crimes in other areas. Two hundred eighty farms belonging to Albanian Moslems were set on fire in twenty-nine villages in the Karadag (Black) mountains and all the male inhabitants who had not flown fell under a hail of bullets and under the bayonets of the soldiers.".
- Summary of report of Deutsches Volksblatt published on 19 February 1913: "Few towns and villages (in the occupied areas) have escaped the attention of the Serbs completely and there are many Albanians who now press to take vengeance for the deaths of their wives and children."
- Claim of Romanian doctor "Dr Leonte", that "That hundreds of Moslem captives were forced to march ... whenever ... collapsed ... they were simply bayoneted".
- Citation from "a letter from Albania" published on 20 March 1913 in the Austro-Hungarian Reichspost, that "thirty men were slaughtered" in Ponoshec, and "seventy Catholics" from Nikaj were slaughtered near Gjakova.
- Claim from Austro-Hungarian Neue Freie Presse published on 21 March 1913 that "We have been told by informed sources ... in Gjakova and Debar ... Many deaths occur every day ... not only the Albanians ... object of such persecution, but also Catholic and Moslem Slavs".
- Claim from Neue Freie Presse published on 20 March 1913 that "On 7 March ... About 300 persons, men, women and children ... forced under threat of death to convert".
- An undated report of Albanische Korrespondenz (Freundlich's own newspaper) that "The carnage perpetrated by the Serbs in Albania is outrageous. Serbian officers boast openly of their deeds." and "Particularly shocking was the behaviour of the Serbs on Luma territory. The men were burnt alive. Old people, women and children were slaughtered."

The book gained much attention in Europe with news-bureaus reporting of "appalling atrocities" being committed by the Serbian–Montenegrin armies.

== Aftermath ==
On 21 December 1913, after Albania's Golgotha, the Corriere delle Puglie made a news piece dubbed "Official Report Submitted to the Great Powers", which was sent to "one of the Great Powers by its own plenipotentiary delegate, who personally compiled the notes and names at the sites of the atrocities and terror". The reports were included in the inquiry Report of the International Commission on the Balkan Wars.

Albanologist Robert Elsie translated the book into English in 2007.

== Assessment ==
Austro-Hungarian propaganda spread news of alleged atrocities of the Serbian army in Albania and Macedonia against the Muslim population, which led to an international commission enquiring the situation, which found no illegal behavior of Serbian troops. The Austro-Hungarian consulate in Belgrade issued a statement that Albanians in Serbian-held territory were "very satisfied", as opposed to Albanians in Montenegrin-controlled territory. The Austro-Hungarian consulate in St. Petersburg confirmed this in March 1913, with "The Serbs are not to blame for the violence in the new regions, but the Montenegrins". The German consulate in Thessaloniki reported on mass atrocities conducted by Bulgarian and Greek troops against Muslims, but reported no such thing regarding Serbian troops. Norwegian observers described Serbian–Montenegrin treatment of civilians as positive, and challenged Austro-Hungarian propaganda and false claims that were disseminated in European press. Other journalists, present on the ground, such as a German correspondent to Spanish ABC and Leipziger Nachrichten, correspondents to French journal L'Illustration, the Swedish Läkartidningen, Aftonbladet, Stockholms Dagblad, the Russian press, and letters and diaries of foreigners assigned to hospitals, make no claims of Serbian atrocities, but on the contrary, observed Albanian misdeeds in the past and present.

Freundlich, the author of Albania's Golgotha, did not travel Albania nor Albanian-inhabited territory until 1915, and his claims are unverified. None of the Austro-Hungarian press challenged the accuracy of reports on atrocities in the Balkan Wars. German historian Wolfgang Höpken noted that accounts such as Freundlich's "can hardly be taken for granted".

== See also ==
- Prochaska Affair

== Sources ==
- Bjelajac, Mile (2019). "The Austro-Hungarian Creation of a "Humanitarian" Pretext for the Planned Invasion of Serbia in 1912–1913: Facts and Counter-Facts". Balcanica. 50: 131–156.
- Bogdanović, Dimitrije (1986). "BALKANSKI RAT 1912-1913.". Knjiga o Kosovu. SANU.
- Elsie, Robert. "Leo Freundlich: Albania's Golgotha: Indictment of the Exterminators of the Albanian People". albanianhistory.net. Robert Eslie. Archived from the original on 2012-05-31.
