= Laura Emily Start =

English ethnographer (1875 – 1957)

Laura Emily Start (1875 – 1957) was an English ethnographer who wrote and lectured on global textiles. After gaining an M.Ed., she lectured in Education and Handicraft at the Victoria University of Manchester and wrote and co-authored several books and articles, including her hand-drawn artifact diagrams, on textile collections from Europe, Central America, and Asia.

In 1939 she collaborated with Edith Durham on The Durham Collection of Garments and Embroideries from Albania and Yugoslavia, which, according to Taylor, 'remains a model of good practice today.'

== Select works ==
- 'Coptic Cloths', Bankfield Museum Notes 4 (1914)
- 'Burmese Textiles from the Shan and Kachin Districts', Notes from Bankfield Museum 7 (1917)
- (with Alfred C. Haddon) Iban or Sea Dayak Fabrics and Their Patterns (1936)
- (with Edith Durham) The Durham Collection of Garments and Embroideries from Albania and Yugoslavia (1939)
- 'Indian Textiles from Guatemala and Mexico', Man 48 (1948)
- The McDougall Collection of Indian Textiles from Guatemala (1968)
