= Edith Durham =

British artist and author (1863–1944)

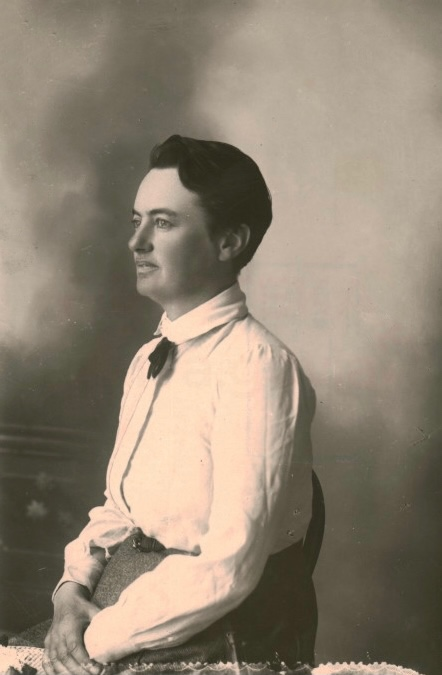
- Edith Durham in the 1880s
- Born: Mary Edith Durham; 8 December 1863; London, England
- Died: 15 November 1944 (aged 80)

Academic work
- Main interests: Albanian history, Culture
- Notable works: High Albania
- Influenced: Robert Elsie

Mary Edith Durham (FRAI, 8 December 1863 – 15 November 1944) was a British artist, anthropologist and writer who is best known for her anthropological accounts of life in Albania in the early 20th century. Her advocacy on behalf of the Albanian cause and her Albanophilia gained her the devotion of many Albanians who consider her a national heroine.

== Early life ==
Durham was the eldest of nine children. Her father, Arthur Edward Durham, was a distinguished London surgeon and her siblings included the scientist Herbert Durham, the geneticist Florence Margaret Durham, the suffragette and musician Lilla Durham and the civil servant Frances Hermia Durham.

She attended Bedford College (1878–1882), followed by the Royal Academy of Arts, to train as an artist. She exhibited widely and contributed a number of detailed drawings to the amphibia and reptiles volume of the Cambridge Natural History (published 1899).

== Balkan expeditions ==
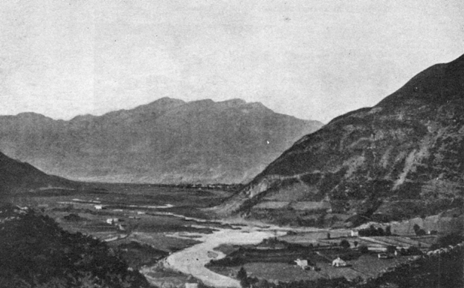
Valley of Gusinje, High Albania, 1909

After the death of her father, Durham took on the responsibilities of caring for her sick mother for several years. It proved an exhausting experience. When she was 37, her doctor recommended that she should undertake a foreign vacation to recuperate. She took a trip by sea down the coast of Dalmatia, travelling from Trieste to Kotor and then overland to Cetinje, the capital of Montenegro. On her return to London she studied the Serbo-Croatian language and the history of the region.

Durham travelled extensively in the Balkans in order to write her first book Through the Lands of the Serbs published in London in 1904. In 1908 she wrote High Albania after travelling through the Albanian highlands, from Montenegro to Shkodër. Over the next twenty years she focused particularly on Albania, which then was one of the most isolated and undeveloped areas of Europe. She worked in a variety of relief organisations, painted and wrote, and she also collected folklore and folk art. In 1911-13 she helped Albanian refugees in Montenegro where she raised funds for medicine, food and helped wounded soldiers.

She contributed frequently to the journal Man and became a Fellow of the Royal Anthropological Institute. Her writings, however, were to earn her particular fame. She wrote seven books on Balkan affairs. High Albania (1909) is the best known and is still regarded as the pre-eminent guide to the customs and the society of northern Albania's highlands.

== Views and reception ==
After her anti-Austrian phase and initial support for the creation of Yugoslavia, Durham became anti-Serbian after the assassination of Franz Ferdinand. Durham was a firm critic of the 6th January Dictatorship. According to American scholars Thomas Cushman and Stjepan Meštrović, her eccentric personality and her incessant lobbying activity made her despised by the British Foreign Office. She denounced what she termed "Serb vermin" for having "not created a Jugoslavia but have carried out their original aim of making Great Serbia.... Far from being liberated the bulk of people live under a far harsher rule than before".

As she was a supporter of Albanian national aspirations, other British intellectuals who were supporters of the Yugoslav cause sharply criticised her views. Author Rebecca West included Durham in her description of the sort of traveller who came back "with a pet Balkan people established in their hearts as suffering and innocent, eternally the massacree and never the massacrer" (Durham sued West over this) and then went on to say: "The Bulgarians, as preferred by some, and the Albanians, as championed by others, strongly resembled Sir Joshua Reynolds's picture of the Infant Samuel". R.W. Seton-Watson commented that "the fact is that while always denouncing 'Balkan mentality', she is herself exactly what she means by the word". (Note: The Durham–Seton-Watson correspondence is housed in the Seton-Walson papers at the School of Slavonic and East European Studies, London.)

For their part, however, the Albanians held Durham in high regard and dubbed her "Mbretëresha e Malësoreve" (the "Queen of the Highlanders)". She was given an embroidered waistcoat by the government to thank her for lobbying the British government on behalf of the occupied city of Korçë. She was well received in the Albanian Highlands.

When she died in 1944, she received high praise for her work from the exiled King Zog, who wrote: "She gave us her heart and she won the ear of our mountaineers". She was also awarded a medal from him for her support. She is still regarded as something of a national heroine; in 2004, Albanian President Alfred Moisiu described her as "one of the most distinguished personalities of the Albanian world during the last century"

== Collections ==
Much of Durham's work was donated to academic collections following her death. Her papers are held by the Royal Anthropological Institute, London, some of her collections of Balkan costume, textile collection and jewellery were given in 1935 are in Bankfield Museum, Halifax. Further gifts of mostly Balkan artefacts were given to the British Museum in 1914 and to the Pitt Rivers Museum, Oxford and the Horniman Museum, London. Some items from her textile collection were displayed in a 2020 exhibition.

== Bibliography ==
- Through the Lands of the Serb (1904)
- The Burden of the Balkans (1905)
- High Albania (1909)
- The Struggle for Scutari (1914)
- Twenty Years of Balkan Tangle (1920)
- The Sarajevo Crime (1925)
- Some Tribal Origins, Laws and Customs of the Balkans (1928)
- Albania and the Albanians: Selected Articles and Letters, 1903–1944, ed. by Bejtullah Destani (I.B. Tauris, 2001)
- The Blaze in the Balkans; Selected Writings, 1903–1941, edited by Robert Elsie and Bejtullah D Destani (I.B. Tauris, 2014)
