= Swedish Medical Association =

Professional association for medical doctors and students

- Abbreviation: SMA
- Formation: 1903
- Type: professional association
- Purpose: representing medical doctors and students
- Headquarters: Vendevägen 89, Danderyd, Stockholm, Sweden
- Chair: Dr. Heidi Stensmyren
- Website: slf.se

The Swedish Medical Association (SMA) is the union and professional organization for medical doctors and medical students in Sweden. In the main, it deploys activities on behalf the Swedish doctors' employment conditions, ethics, working environment, and also regarding patient safety.

== Organization ==
The Swedish Medical Association was founded in 1903. Its membership in February 2019 was officially given as 54,869, which comprises about 85 percent of the medical doctors in the country. About a third of medical doctors working in Sweden come from foreign countries, and membership in the organization is granted irrespectively of citizenship.

Membership of medical students comprises 75 percent of all medical students in Sweden, whose total number is 8,100.

Since 2020, the organization's chair is Sofia Rydgren Stale.

The organization owns the Swedish medical journal Läkartidningen.

=== The Swedish doctors’ professional associations ===
The Swedish Medical Association is divided into eight professional sections, such as the Swedish Junior Hospital Doctors’ Association (SYLF, for doctors completing their internship and specialist training), the Swedish District Doctors Association (for general practitioners), the Swedish Military Doctors Association, the Swedish Private Doctors Association, on other sections. Each of these associations elect its own board, and there is also a Federal Board elected in annual meetings.

== Main issues addressed by SMA ==
The Swedish Medical Association main endeavors are the general employment conditions of Swedish doctors including training and research, ethics, salary, and work environment. Patient safety is also a main issue.

Besides to represent the Swedish doctors in bilateral negotiations with their employers, the organization also works for developing and improving Swedish health care, for which SMA conducts own investigations and present proposals for solutions.

The SMA is among the organizations that governmental authorities consult regarding health care policies, new legislations, and other society-relevant issues.
