= Frances Hermia Durham =

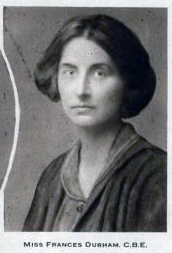
- in 1918
- Born: 14 August 1873; Pagham, England
- Died: 18 August 1948 (aged 75)

Frances Hermia Durham CBE (14 August 1873 – 18 August 1948) was a noted British civil servant, the first woman to reach the rank of assistant secretary, who was largely responsible for organisation of women's services in the army, munitions and agriculture during World War I, for which she was appointed a CBE.

== Early life and education ==
Hermia Durham was born in Pagham, Sussex in 1873, the youngest of nine children of the noted surgeon Arthur Edward Durham; her siblings included the traveller and anthropologist Edith Durham, the physician and scientist Herbert Durham, the geneticist Florence Margaret Durham and the suffragette and musician Lilla Durham. She was educated at Notting Hill High School and Girton College, Cambridge, where she studied history from 1892 to 1896.

== Academic career ==
She worked as a historical researcher from 1897 to 1900. In 1899 she was awarded the Alexander medal by the Royal Historical Society for her essay entitled 'The Relations of the Crown to Trade under James I.' In 1902 she wrote Volume 3 of the series 'English History Illustrated from Original Sources' covering the period from 1399 to 1485.

== Civil Service career ==
From 1900 to 1907 she was co-founder of and served as honorary secretary of the Registry and Apprenticeship Committee of the Women's University Settlement in Southwark. From 1907 to 1915 she worked as an organiser and inspector for technical classes for women and trade schools under the London County Council Education Committee, and was on the Board of Education consultative committee from 1908 to 1913. There she was described as a woman of enthusiasm, industry and organising ability, and she developed the trade schools for girls to a high technical standard and took a major role in the successful reconstruction of evening institutes.

In view of her expertise in job placement and technical training she was approached by the Board of Trade in 1915 to lead its wartime programme for substituting women's for men's labour. In 1916 she was appointed as chief woman inspector of the Labour Exchanges and Unemployment Insurance Department of the Board of Trade, which was transferred in 1917 to the Ministry of Labour, she was concerned with the recruitment of women for a wide range of activities, including the women's branches of the armed services, munitions work, agricultural labour and clerical work in government departments. The Times later accredited her as being, during the war,‘largely responsible for directing women's services in the Army, on munitions, and on the land.' For this work for the war effort she was appointed a CBE by George V in 1918.

She was a strong believer in women's abilities and spent much energy and time attempting to secure a larger place for women in the work force in general and the Civil Service in particular. At the end of World War I she was put in charge of the Women's Training Department of the Ministry of Labour. In 1923 she was promoted to the post of assistant secretary, the first woman in the Civil Service to rise so high, and she was put in charge of the Juvenile Employment Section. In this role she established close contacts with industry and business and so could promote practical schemes for fostering the employment of young people.

== Retirement ==
She retired from the Civil Service in 1933 and devoted her time to gardening and needlework as well as sitting as a co-opted member of the Education Committee of the Devon County Council until 1939. She died in 1948.
