= Emmy Freundlich =

Austrian writer and politician

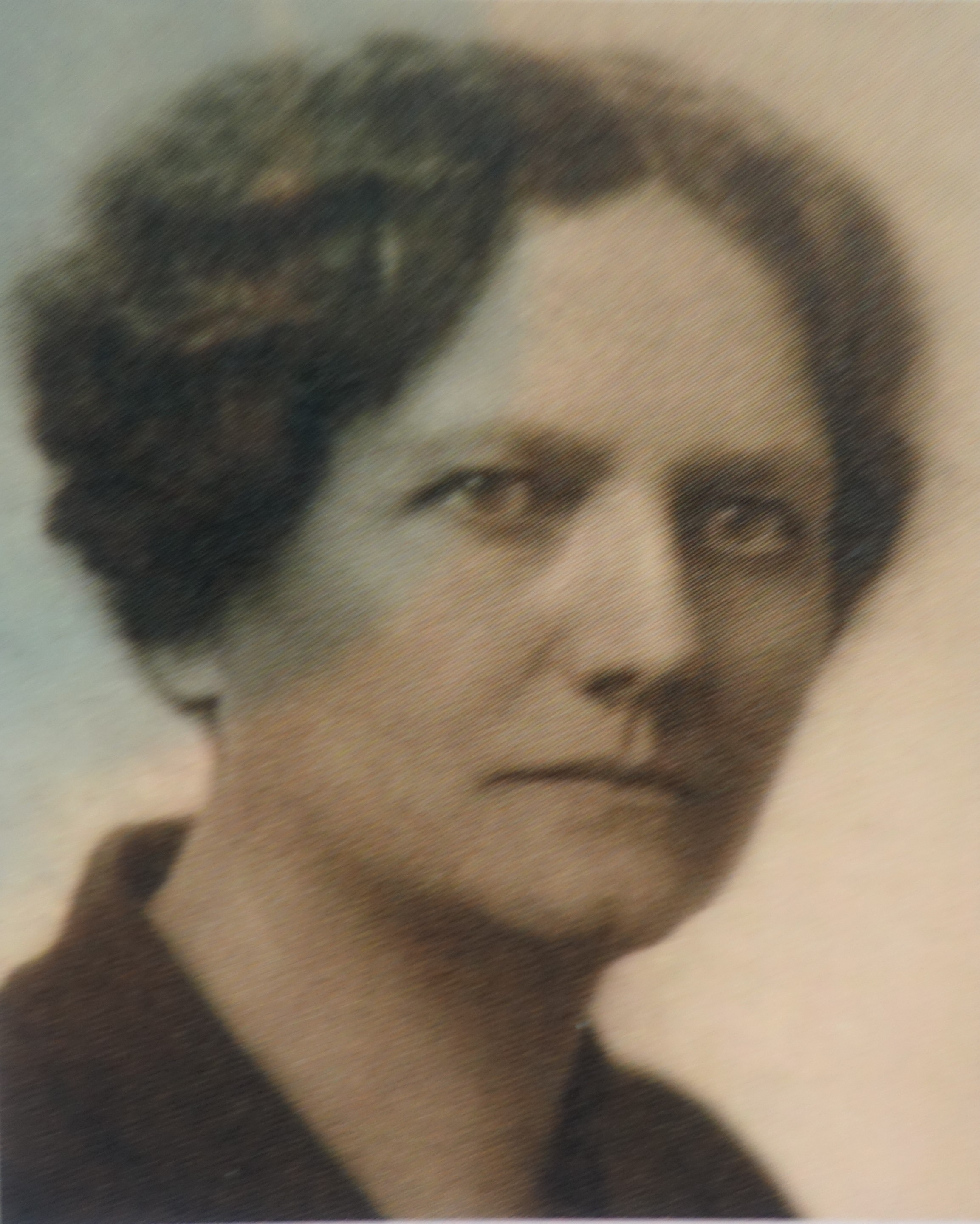

Member of the National Council
- In office 1920–1930; 1930–1934

Member of the Constituent National Assembly
- In office 1919–1920

Personal details
- Born: 25 June 1878; Aussig, Austria-Hungary
- Died: 16 March 1948 (aged 69); New York City, United States
- Spouse: Leo Freundlich (m. 1900; div. 1911)

Emma Freundlich (25 June 1878 – 16 March 1948) was an Austrian writer and politician. In 1919 she was one of eight women elected to the Constituent Assembly, becoming the country's first female parliamentarians. She remained in parliament until 1934, when she was arrested and imprisoned following the Austrian Civil War.

== Biography ==
Freundlich was born Emma Kögler, the youngest daughter of Adolf Kögler, a wealthy engineer and liberal politician who served as mayor of Aussig (now Ústí nad Labem in the Czech Republic). In 1900 she travelled to Gretna Green against the wishes of her family to marry Leo Freundlich (1875–1954), a social democratic journalist. The couple moved to Mährisch Schönberg, where Leo became editor of Volkswacht. After having two daughters, Emmy became active in social democratic politics and in 1907 began writing on family and women's issues for Kampf, a social democratic journal; she continued writing for it until 1928. In the same year Leo was elected to the Imperial Council of Cisleithania. After Leo's defeat in the 1911 elections, the couple divorced and Emmy moved to Vienna.

In Vienna, Freundlich became involved in the social democratic group of Karl Renner and the consumer cooperative movement. During World War I she was appointed to the Food Office of the Directorate of the War Economy. In 1918 she became a member of Vienna City Council, remaining a member until 1923. The following year she was a Social Democratic Party candidate in the Constituent Assembly elections and was one of eight women elected, Austria's first female parliamentarians. She was re-elected in 1920, 1923, 1927 and 1930. In 1921 she became president of the International Cooperative Women's Guild, a role she held until 1948. In 1929 she was a delegate to the League of Nations Economic Section, its only female member.

Following the Austrian Civil War in 1934, she was imprisoned. In 1939 she left for London. During World War II she established the Austrian Committee for Relief. She moved to New York in 1947 to become an observer of the United Nations Economic and Social Council and died there the following year.
