= Florence Margaret Durham =

British geneticist (1869–1949)

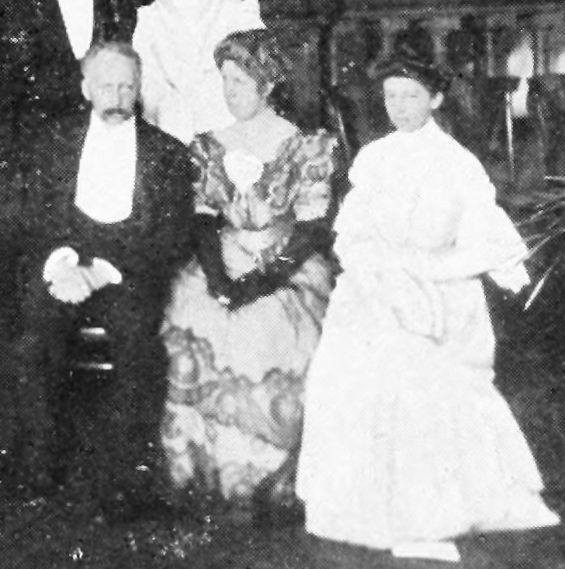
- William Bateson, Beatrice Bateson and Florence Durham, 1906
- Born: 6 April 1869; London, England
- Died: 25 June 1949 (aged 80); The University Women's Club, London, England
- Education: Girton College, Cambridge
- Relatives: William Bateson (brother-in-law)
- Scientific career
- Fields: Genetics
- Workplaces: Royal Holloway College, Froebel Institute, Newnham College and National Institute for Medical Research
- Academic advisors: William Bateson

Florence Margaret Durham (6 April 1869 – 25 June 1949) was a British geneticist at Cambridge in the early 1900s and an advocate of the theory of Mendelian inheritance, at a time when it was still controversial. She was part of an informal school of genetics at Cambridge led by her brother-in-law William Bateson. Her work on the heredity of coat colours in mice and canaries helped to support and extend Mendel's law of heredity. It is also one of the first examples of epistasis.

== Early life and education ==
Florence Margaret Durham was born on 9 December 1869 in London, one of six daughters of surgeon Arthur Edward Durham (1833–1895) and his wife Mary. Her siblings included the anthropologist Edith Durham, the scientist Herbert Durham, the suffragette and musician Lilla Durham and the civil servant Frances Hermia Durham.

In 1891 and 1892, Florence Durham achieved second class honours in the Natural Sciences Tripos Part I and II (physiology) at Girton College. From 1893 to 1899 she lectured in Biology at Royal Holloway College and the Froebel Institute in London. In June 1896, her sister Beatrice married William Bateson.

== Career ==
From 1900 to 1910, she was a demonstrator in Physiology at the Balfour Laboratory.

Towards the end of the 19th century, female students were still facing resistance from Cambridge academics, including a move by some scientists to prevent them from taking introductory biology courses. A letter from Durham published in the Girton Review in 1899 called on the women's colleges Girton and Newnham College, Cambridge to "encourage advanced and research work and thus to show the world that women mean to do serious work and have higher aims in view than mere success in examination." The colleges responded to this and other pressure by raising money for more research fellowships.

=== Newnham College Mendelians, 1900–1910 ===
Between 1900 and 1910, Gregor Mendel's work on inheritance was rediscovered and caused a bitter controversy between its supporters – William Bateson and his group of Mendelians – and its opponents, who included Walter Frank Raphael Weldon (Bateson's former teacher) and Carl Pearson. Weldon's group were known as the Biometrics. William Bateson's group at Cambridge was very unusual for its time, in that it was made up mainly of women. Florence Durham, Edith Rebecca "Becky" Saunders and Muriel Wheldale performed work to show that complex traits could be explained by Mendel's law of segregation. Florence´s sister Beatrice was also actively involved in his research.

Florence Durham joined Bateson´s group as a post-graduate research student who had already published research.

Durham began working on the heredity of mice coat colours in 1903, with Muriel Wheldale. She challenged the prevailing view of Lucien Cuénot, who proposed that it was the combination of factors which explained the different colours of mouse coats. Beatrice Bateson wrote in her memoir that her sister Florence "hybridised mice in a kind of attic over the Museums".

Durham invoked the concept of epistasis to explain that coat colour relied on the relationship between four different factors. The term "epistasis" was coined by William Bateson, and Durham invoked it to explain how genes could interact in a more complex way than the simple dominant and recessive characteristics identified by Gregor Mendel. She wrote, "the terms 'dominant' and 'recessive' should only be applied to express relationship between factors in the same allelomorphic pair". She also undertook some chemical analysis of the pigments in mouse skin and hair in the Chemistry Department of Cambridge University with Gowland Hopkins. She worked on several projects. In 1905 she began a collaboration with Dorothea Charlotte Edith Marrya on sex inheritance and eye colour in canaries. Their published observations in Durham and Marryat (1908) that pink eyes and female sex were inherited together in cinnamon canaries provided a possible mammalian example for sex linkage that had been recorded in moths. Durham continued working with canaries for at least the next decade.

In 1906 she attended the Third International Conference on Genetics in London and attended a further international congress in 1911. In 1910 she gave a lecture about 'Mendelism and the Laws of Heredity' to the Girton Natural Sciences Club, illustrated with mice that she had bred. In 1910, she moved to the new John Innes Horticultural Institute in Surrey where Bateson had accepted a position as director to work with him on plant genetics, including a study of tetraploid primrose hybrids.

=== Medical Research Council, 1917-1930 ===
From 1917 until her retirement in 1930, Durham worked for the Central Research Laboratory (now the National Institute for Medical Research), in its Division of Biochemistry and Pharmacology, working under Henry Dale. Her work mainly focused on neosalvarsan, an organoarsenic compound that was used to treat syphilis. She and her colleague Miss Marchal were responsible for ensuring that preparations of neosalvarsan met the quality standard and issuing licences on behalf of the Board of Trade.

In 1932, Durham published the results of a long-term experiment into the genetic effects of alcohol on guinea pigs, conducted at NIMR. The study was done in response to reports by American researcher Charles Rupert Stockard that the offspring of alcohol-exposed guinea pigs exhibited defects attributable to the parents' alcohol exposure. After breeding 6,983 guinea pigs over the course of several years, Durham found no evidence that daily doses of alcohol had any hereditary effects; the percentage of offspring born with genetic defects was no higher among the intoxicated guinea pigs than among the control group. This was one of several studies that discredited the Lamarckian theory of inheritance that Stockard's work appeared to support.

== Personal life and death ==
In her later years, Durham lived at Hawkern, Otterton near Budleigh Salterton, Devon. She died on 25 June 1949, at the University Women's Club, London.

== Scientific publications ==
Durham's scientific publications include:

- Durham, Florence M. 1905. On the Presence of Tyrosinase in the Skins of Some Pigmented Vertebrates: Preliminary Note. Proc. Roy. Soc. London, 74:311-313
- Durham, Florence M. 1907. Note on Melanin. Journal of Physiology, 35: xlvii-xlviii
- Durham, Florence M. 1908. A Preliminary Account of the Inheritance of Coat-Colour in Mice. W. Bateson, E.R. Saunders, and R.C. Punnett (eds.), Reports to the Evolution Committee, Report 4. London: Royal Society of London, pp. 41–53.
- Durham, Florence M. and Marryat, Dorothea. 1908. Note on the Inheritance of Sex in Canaries. W. Bateson, E.R. Saunders and R. C. Punnett (eds.), Reports to the Evolution Committee, Report 5. London: Royal Society, pp. 57–60.
- Durham, Florence M (1910–1911). "Further Experiments on the Inheritance of Coat Colour in Mice". Journal of Genetics. 1 (3): 159–178. doi:10.1007/bf02981549. S2CID 45721734.
- Pellew, Caroline; Durham, Florence M (1916). "The Genetic Behaviour of the Hybrid Primula Kewensis, and its Allies". Journal of Genetics. 5 (3): 159–182. doi:10.1007/bf02981838. S2CID 2653720.
- Durham, Florence M. 1917. Sex Linkage and Other Genetical Phenomena in Canaries. Journal of Genetics, 17:19-32.
- Durham, Florence M. and Woods, H.M. 1932. Alcohol and Inheritance: An Experimental Study. Special Report Series, Medical Research Council 168.
