= Lilla Durham =

British suffragette and musician

- Born: Alice Lilian Durham; 1871; Mayfair, London, England
- Died: 1935 (aged 64)
- Occupations: Suffragist, violinist

Alice Lilian "Lilla" Durham (1871 – 25 October 1935) was a British suffragette and musician. She was a member of the militant Women's Social and Political Union and was arrested and imprisoned for breaking windows in the West End of London in 1911 and 1912. She was also a violinist and translated the biography of Joseph Joachim in 1901.

== Life ==
Durham was born in 1871 in Mayfair, London. Her father, Arthur Edward Durham (1833–1895), was a surgeon at Guy's Hospital, London and her mother, Mary, was the daughter of the economist and school founder William Ellis. She was one of nine siblings including the anthropologist Edith Durham, the scientists Herbert Durham and Florence Margaret Durham, and the civil servant Frances Hermia Durham.

Durham trained as a violinist at the Royal Academy of Music and with Andreas Moser in Berlin and worked as a music teacher at Saint Felix School, Southwold. She also produced an English translation of Moser’s German biography of the violinist Joseph Joachim, which was published in 1901.

Durham died on 25 October 1935 at Mitchells in West Chiltington, West Sussex, aged 64.

== Politics ==
In July 1911, along with Lady Muriel Sackville, Marie Corbett and Helen MacRae, Durham was part of the group who founded the East Grinstead Suffrage Society in East Grinstead, East Sussex to campaign for the right to vote for women. The EGSS was a suffragist group aligned with the National Union of Women's Suffrage Societies, which aimed to use legal means. Durham had a house at Hartfield, a village near East Grinstead.

Also in 1911, Durham joined the Women's Social and Political Union and helped launch a new branch in Tunbridge Wells. The WPSU, known as suffragettes, were prepared to break the law in their campaign. Durham was arrested on 21 November 1911 for breaking several windows in the West End of London after a protest against a proposed franchise bill, which did not include women's suffrage. The November protest included a Women's Parliament in Caxton Hall, Westminster, followed by a march to the Palace of Westminster, which was protected by a police cordon. A separate group of women were equipped with stones and hammers at the Woman's Press in Charing Cross Road and sent to break windows in Whitehall and the West End. It was a new departure because premises not connected to the government were attacked and because over 200 suffragettes were imprisoned. Durham was tried at the Bow Street Magistrates' Court on 28 November along with Maud Joachim, the niece of the violinist, and sentenced to 14 days imprisonment at Holloway Prison, to be released on 11 December.

Durham was arrested again on 1 March 1912, for breaking three shop windows in Regent Street, London. The 1 March demonstration was organised in secret as a prelude to a larger demonstration on 4 March. Volunteers reported to a room at the Gardenia Restaurant in Catherine Street, near the Strand and were issued with hammers and instructions on how to use them. Durham was arrested, refused bail and was remanded to Holloway Prison. She was tried at the Newington Sessions on 26 March and found not guilty.
