= Max von Gruber =

Austrian bacteriologist (1853–1927)

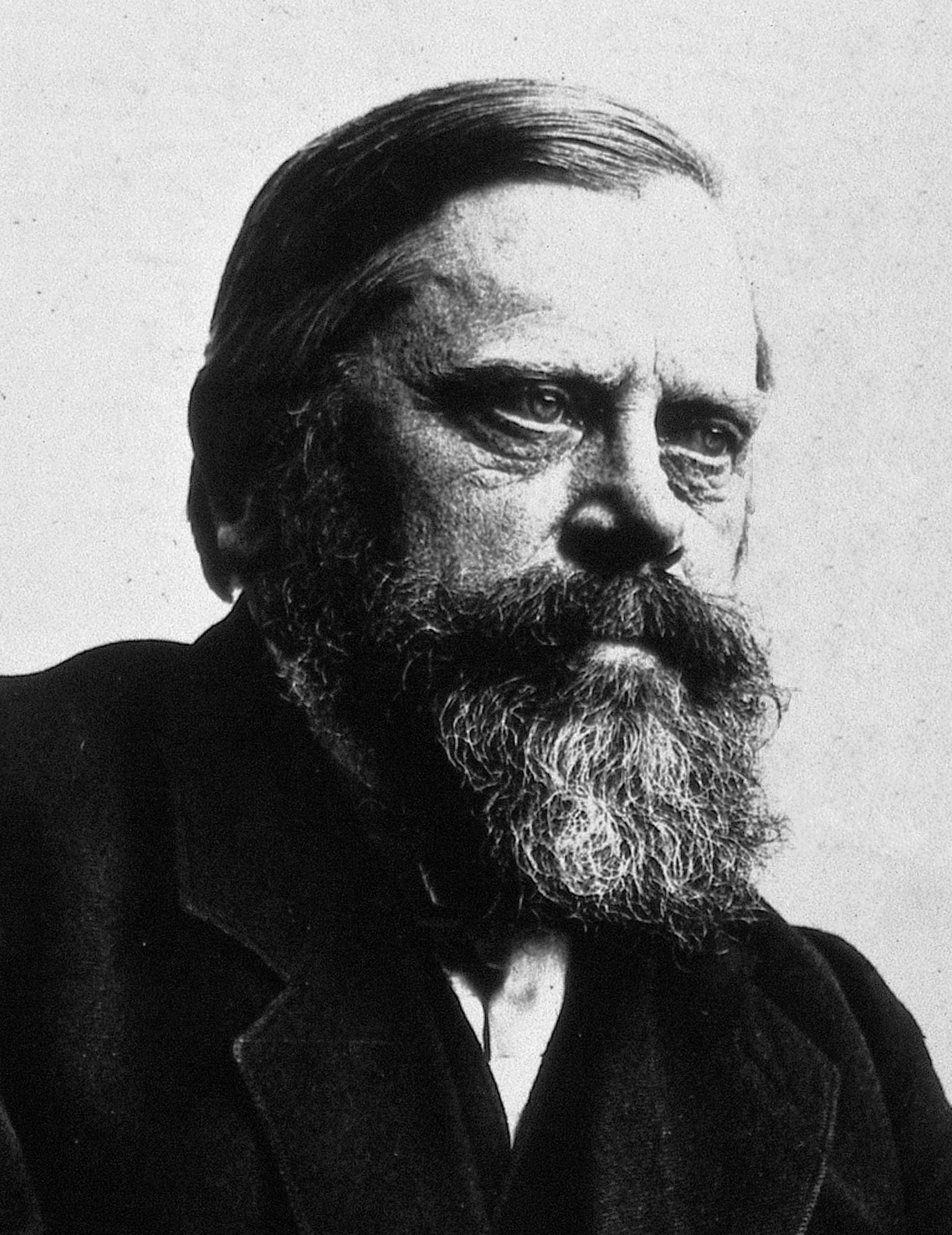
Max von Gruber in 1913

Max von Gruber (6 July 1853, in Vienna – 16 September 1927, in Berchtesgaden) was an Austrian scientist and eugenicist. As a bacteriologist he discovered specific agglutination in 1896 with his English colleague Herbert Durham (Gruber-Widal-reaction). But his main interests were studying hygiene and sexual life.

Max von Gruber was the son of Ignaz Gruber (1803–1872), a general practitioner and the first specialist in otology in Austria, and publisher of a two-volume textbook on medical chemistry (1835). His brother was Franz von Gruber. He graduated from the Schottengymnasium in Vienna and studied medicine at the University of Vienna, receiving his medical doctorate in 1876. He then learned chemistry and physiology under Max von Pettenkofer (1818–1901) and Karl von Voit (1831–1908) in Munich and Karl Ludwig (1816–1895) in Leipzig. Also working under Pettenkofer was Hans Ernst August Buchner (1850–1902), who encouraged Gruber to concentrate on bacteriology.

Unlike some of the great names of the time, among them Carl Wilhelm Nägeli, Theodor Billroth (1829–1894), Ferdinand Cohn (1828–1898), and Robert Koch (1843–1910), Gruber recognized that bacteria possess a variability within limits partially determined by the culture medium. This theory was important for the differentiation of the categories of bacteria and gained significance for Gruber in his examinations of cholera vibrios, enabling him to distinguish them from other vibrios.

He blamed alcoholism and sexually transmitted diseases for the degradation of human germ plasm and society and advocated for eugenics, observing that medicine and hygiene were important in removing degenerate people and other conditions that weaken the race.

In 1882 Gruber was habilitated as a lecturer in Vienna, and two years later he became associate professor and head of the newly established Institute for Hygiene at the University of Graz. On 23 March 1887 he became ausserordentlicher professor in Vienna, succeeding Josef Nowak, and on 10 December 1891 he was appointed to the chair of hygiene established in 1875 at the University of Vienna. Karl Landsteiner became his assistant in 1896. Another of his pupils, Alois Lode, in 1897 became the first professor in the new chair of hygiene at the University of Innsbruck. The working conditions in the Institute of Hygiene were so poor, that Gruber attempted to resign his chair and find employment as head of a laboratory in München or at the Jenner Institute in London, under Joseph Lister. It was while in Vienna, however, that Gruber, with his English student Herbert Edward Durham (1866–1945), discovered the agglutination which gained him international fame.

Gruber eventually left Vienna in 1902, and in October that year he succeeded Hans Buchner as director of the Institute for Hygiene in München. He held the post until his voluntary retirement in 1923, on the occasion of his seventieth birthday. In Vienna he was succeeded by Arthur Schattenfroh (1869–1923), who held the chair from 1905 to 1923.

During his last years, Gruber concentrated completely on his duties as president of the Bavarian Academy of Sciences.

With Max Rubner and Philipp Martin Ficker (1868–1950) he published the Handbuch der Hygiene. 6 volumes; Leipzig, S. Hirtzel, 1911–1913.

As a leading racial hygienist, when he first met the Nazi dictator Adolf Hitler he described him as:

It was the first time I had seen Hitler close at hand. Face and head of inferior type, cross-breed; low receding forehead, ugly nose, broad cheekbones, little eyes, dark hair. Expression not of a man exercising authority in perfect self-command, but of raving excitement. At the end an expression of satisfied egotism.

— Description as a witness at court in 1923

== Bibliography ==
- Über die als «Kommabacillen» bezeichneten Vibrionen von Koch und Finkler-Prior. Wiener medizinische Wochenschrift, 1885, 35, Nos 9–10: 261–264, 1907–301. Referring to Robert Koch (1843–1910), who established a nonsporulating, comma-shaped bacillus to be the causative agent of cholera. Dittmar Finkler (1852–1912) and J. Prior isolated Vibrio proteus from stools in a case of acute gastro-enteritis.
- "Über active und passive Immunität gegen Cholera und Typhus, sowie über die bacteriologische Diagnose der Cholera und des Typhus." Wiener klinische Wochenschrift, 1896, 9: Nos 11–12: 183–186, 204–209.
- 14. Congress für Innere Medizin. Wiesbaden, 1896. Verhandlungen des Kongresses für innere Medizin, 1896: 207–227.
- Neue Früchte der Ehrlich’schen Toxinlehre. Wiener klinische Wochenschrift, 1903, 16: 791–793.
- Hygiene des Geschlechtslebens. Stuttgart, 1903; 52nd edition, 1925; translated into several foreign languages.
- "Wirkungsweise und Ursprung der aktiven Stoffe in den präventiven und antitoxischen Seris." Wiener klinische Wochenschrift, 1903, 16: 1097–1105.
- Schulärzte. Munich, 1905.
- Die Pflicht, gesund zu sein. Stuttgart, 1909.
- Fortpflanzung, Vererbung und Rassenhygiene. With Ernst Rüdin (born 1874). Munich, 1911.
- Einleitung. [Introduction] Handbuch der Hygiene, volume 2, 1; Leipzig, 1927.
- "Geschichte der Entdeckung der spezifischen Agglutination." In Rudolf Kraus (1868–1932) and Constantin Levaditi (1874–1953), editors: Handbuch der Technik und Methodik der Immunitätsforschung. Jena, 1914, I: 150–154.
- "Lord Lister und Deutschland." Münchener medizinische Wochenschrift, 1927, 74: 592–593.
- Dankrede anlässlich der Feier seines 70. Geburtstages. Münchener medizinische Wochenschrift, 123: 70: 1038–1039.
