= Thomas Cushman (sociologist) =

American sociologist

Thomas Cushman (born 1959) is an American sociologist. He is the professor of social sciences and sociology at Wellesley College.

Cushman is editor of The Routledge Handbook of Human Rights (2011) and founder and editor-at-large of the Journal of Human Rights. He is a member of the editorial board of the Journal of Controversial Ideas.

Thomas Orton Cushman received his B.S. degree in psychology from Saint Michael's College in 1981. He completed an M.A. degree in sociology at the University of Virginia in 1983 with the thesis Symbols and Social Movements: The Case of the Moral Majority. Cushman then earned a Ph.D. degree in sociology from the University of Virginia in 1987 with the thesis Ritual and the Sacralization of the Secular: Social Sources of Conformity and Order in Soviet Society.

== Bibliography ==
- Notes from Underground: Rock Music Counterculture in Russia (A Choice Outstanding Academic Book, 1995)
- This Time We Knew: Western Responses to Genocide in Bosnia, edited with Stjepan Meštrović (New York University Press, 1996)
- Critical Theory and the War in Croatia and Bosnia (Henry M. Jackson School of International Affairs, University of Washington, 1997)
- George Orwell: Into the 21st Century, with John Rodden (Paradigm, 2005)
- A Matter of Principle: Humanitarian Arguments for War in Iraq, editor (University of California Press, 2005)
- Terror, Iraq and the Left: Christopher Hitchens and His Critics, with Simon Cottee (New York University Press, 2008)
- The Religious in Responses to Mass Atrocity, edited with Thomas Brudholm (Cambridge University Press, 2009).
