= Stewart Ranken Douglas =

British bacteriologist (1871–1936)

- Born: February 12, 1871; Caterham, England
- Died: January 20, 1936 (aged 64)
- Citizenship: British
- Education: Haileybury and Imperial Service College, St Bartholomew's Hospital
- Occupations: Pathologist, bacteriologist, immunologist
- Employer(s): Indian Medical Service, National Institute for Medical Research
- Spouse: Frances Miriam Clare Nias née Dayrell (m. 1920)
- Awards: Fellow of the Royal Society (1922)
- Scientific career
- Fields: Pathology, bacteriology, immunology

Stewart Ranken Douglas FRS (12 February 1871, Caterham – 20 January 1936) was a British pathologist, bacteriologist and immunologist.

After education at Haileybury College, Douglas studied medicine at St Bartholomew's Hospital and received there in 1896 M.R.C.S., L.R.C.P. (Lond.). He joined the Indian Medical Service on 28 January 1898 with the rank of second-lieutenant. All Indian Medical Service officers at that time were required to complete a course in pathology at Netley Hospital under Dr (later Sir) Almroth Wright. In 1899 Wright requested that Douglas accompany him to India for the investigative research of the first Plague Commission. On 31 March 1899 Douglas and H. J. Walton (at that time a lieutenant) were sent to investigate plague in the Garhwal District and other areas of the Kumaon Division of the United Provinces of Agra and Oudh. Their investigation lasted about 5 months, during which Douglas suffered from recurring episodes of malaria. After completing this investigation, Douglas was sent in 1900 to China as part of the medical staff for the Gaselee Expedition in connection with the Boxer Rebellion. In China he was promoted to the rank of captain on 28 January 1901. However, in China he became infected with amoebic dysentery and developed a liver abscess. (From 1901 to the end of his life he suffered serious health problems.) He was given a medical discharge from the Indian Medical Service. Douglas returned to the UK and joined Almroth Wright at St Mary's Hospital to do research on vaccine therapy. For a pension from the Indian Medical Service, Douglas was put on temporary half pay on 15 September 1905 and was put on permanent half pay on 15 September 1907. In 1909 he was appointed a lecturer at St Mary's Hospital Medical School.

When World War I started, the supply of peptones from Germany was cut off. Peptones were used by British bacteriologists in nutrient media for growing Salmonella typhi as part of the programme for preparing vaccines against typhoid fever. Within a few days, Douglas produced a new and superior peptone medium for bacterial culture. He joined Wright in Boulogne-sur-Mer but developed sciatica and returned to the UK for treatment. In 1915 he returned to work at St Mary's on vaccines against typhoid and other bacterial infections. Douglas also did research on dysentery. In 1916 he worked in St Mary Hospital's special wards for wounded soldiers and developed a successful method of autologous skin-grafting.

In 1921 Douglas was appointed director of the Department of Bacteriology and Experimental Pathology in the National Institute for Medical Research under the direction of Sir Henry Dale at Mount Vernon Hospital in Hampstead and also deputy director for the NIMR under the director Dale. As head of his department, Douglas organised the research of Laidlaw, Dobell, William E. Gye (who worked on the Rous sarcoma virus), Ian A. Galloway (who worked on foot-and-mouth disease) and other researchers. Much of the research dealt with immunology and virology, especially viruses that cause dysentery. Douglas worked on the extraction of bacteria by acetone. This extraction method led to Georges Dreyer's 'diaplyte' and Dreyer's synthetic medium for the growth of tubercle bacilli; Dreyer's advances lead to a more effective form of tuberculin skin test.

It was a newspaper report suggesting that German secret agents had infiltrated the London Underground in order to carry out experiments with bacteria that prompted the British government to seek expert advice on the potential of biological warfare from a small number of civilian scientists consulted in secret. The most influential were Professor John Ledingham, Director of the Lister Institute; the epidemiologist and bacteriologist Professor William Topley of the London School of Hygiene and Tropical Medicine; and Captain Stewart Ranken Douglas, Deputy Director of the National Institute for Medical Research. Their 1934 'Memorandum on Bacteriological Warfare' became a benchmark for the deliberations of the Committee of Imperial Defence's Sub-Committee on Bacteriological Warfare.

In Kensington in 1920 Douglas married Frances Miriam Clare Nias née Dayrell. She was born in 1872 and married in 1896 the physician Joseph Baldwin Nias (1856–1919), whose father was Admiral Sir Joseph Nias (1793–1879). By his marriage, S. R. Douglas acquired a step-daughter.

== Awards and honours ==
- 1917 — Chevalier de l’Ordre de la Couronne de Belgique
- 1922 — Fellow of the Royal Society
- 1933 — Fellow of the Royal College of Physicians
