= Herbert Durham =

Herbert Durham FRCS
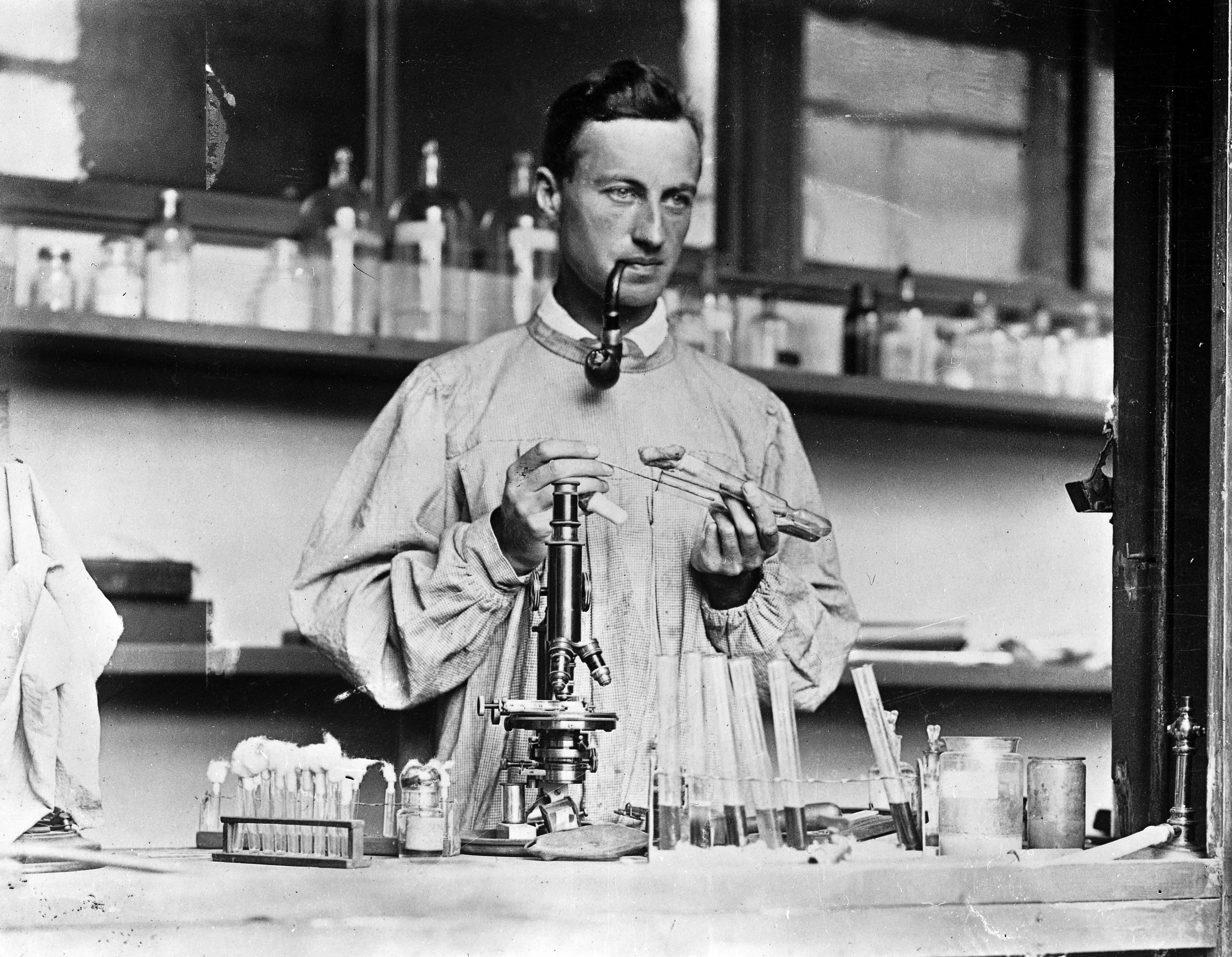
- Herbert Durham in the Department of Pathology, Cambridge University. Wellcome Images
- Born: 30 March 1866
- Died: 25 October 1945 (aged 79)
- Education: University of Cambridge; Guy's Hospital, London
- Scientific career
- Fields: Bacteriology, Pathology, Zymology
- Workplaces: University of Cambridge

Herbert Edward Durham (30 March 1866 – 25 October 1945) was a British physician and distinguished scientist.

== Early life ==
Herbert Edward Durham was born 30 March 1866, the son of Arthur E. Durham, Senior Surgeon to Guy's Hospital. His siblings included the anthropologist Edith Durham, the scientist Florence Margaret Durham, the suffragette and musician Lilla Durham and the civil servant Frances Hermia Durham. In 1907, he married Maud Lowry, daughter of Captain William Moyse Harmer of the 81st Regiment.

== Education ==
Durham was educated at University College School, London; University College, London from 1883 to 1884; King's College, Cambridge from 1884; and Guy's Hospital, London.

In 1904 he was awarded a John Lucas Walker Studentship in Pathology, a scholarship given by the University of Cambridge for original pathological research.

== Career ==
=== Bacteriology ===
Durham was assistant demonstrator in histology from 1884 to 1889, then house surgeon at Guy's Hospital, London from 1889-95.

From 1895 to 1896 he worked at the Hygiene Institute, Vienna where he was associated with Professor Max von Gruber in the discovery of agglutination of bacteria. In 1897 he developed an agglutination reaction for diagnosis of typhoid fever, which then was called the Grubler-Durham reaction, subsequently known as the Widal reaction; and also created "Durham tubes" for measuring the amount of gas produced in the bacterial colonies, which are still used universally in microbiology laboratories.

From 1896 to 1898 he was a working Member of the Tsetse Fly Disease Committee of the Royal Society.

In June 1900 under the auspices of the Liverpool School of Tropical Medicine and accompanied by fellow eminent Cambridge parasitologist, Dr Walter Myers, Durham led the Yellow Fever Expedition to Brazil. In 1881 the Cuban epidemiologist Dr Carlos Finlay was the first to theorise that yellow fever was transmitted by mosquitoes, but this remained unproven in the wider scientific community. While en route to Brazil they visited the U.S. Naval Hospital in Washington where they met U. S. Surgeon General George Miller Sternberg who is considered the first U.S. bacteriologist, and then proceeded to Havana where they met Dr Finlay and his co-workers on 25 July 1900, and also the U.S. Army Yellow Fever Commission, led by Dr Walter Reed, which subsequently confirmed Dr Finlay's theory. Among Reed's team was bacteriologist Dr Jesse Lazear who died a month later on 26 September aged 34 while investigating the disease. On 24 August Durham and Myers arrived in Pari (modern day Belém) in the northern state of Pará, Brazil, where they established a laboratory to study the transmission of the disease and were among the first to establish its transmission by mosquitoes. Durham and Myers were aware of the risks that they were taking; however, on 16 January 1901, after conducting the fourteenth autopsy on victims of yellow fever both men found they were themselves infected. They were transferred to the Domingos Freire Isolation Hospital in Pari where Durham recovered but Myers died four days later, aged 28. In his subsequent report Durham deduced that they had both been infected through mosquito bites.

He was subsequently in charge of an expedition to investigate beriberi in the Malay Peninsula and on Christmas Island, organised by London School of Tropical Medicine.

He introduced Derris as insecticide from Malaya.

=== Zymology ===
In 1905 aged 39 he had to give up his research activities as a result of deterioration of his vision and became engaged in the study of fermentation and allied problems. He worked as a chemist and scientific adviser to cider manufacturer, H. P. Bulmer and Company. Through his isolation of wild yeast which ensured that fermentations were consistent, Durham assisted his close college friend, Fred Bulmer, in the development of commercial cider-making.

== Military service ==
Durham was 48 at the outbreak of the First World War and served as Hon. Lieutenant in the Royal Army Medical Corps and Major in the Special List.

== Other interests ==
Durham had a strong interest in photography. He was an Associate of the Royal Photographic Society where he exhibited regularly and was a Medallist in 1927.

== Publications ==
- On Nagana, or Tsetse Fly Disease Kanthack, A. A.; H. E. Durham and W. F. H. Blandford, 1898
- Report of the Yellow Fever Expedition to Parà of the Liverpool School of Tropical Medicine . H. E. Durham, Longmans, Green & Co, 1902
- Recherche et dosage des métaux lourds dans le cidre, Dr H.E. Durham, 1937

Durham wrote numerous papers on various medical, pathological, and hygienic subjects including:

- An Address on the Present Knowledge of Outbreaks due to Meat Poisoning: Delivered before the Medical Society of Oldham on November 22nd, 1898. Durham H. E., Br Med J. 1898 Dec 17;2(1981):1797-801.
- On Persistence of the Thyreoglossal Duct, with Remarks on Median Cervical Fistulæ and Cysts due to Embryonic Remnants. Durham H. E., Med Chir Trans. 1894;77:199-228.1.
- On the Clinical Bearing of some Experiments on Peritoneal Infections. Durham H. E., Med Chir Trans. 1897;80:191-204.
- A Simple Method for Demonstrating the Production of Gas by Bacteria. Durham H. E., Br Med J. 1898 May 28;1(1952):1387.
- Some Theoretical Considerations Upon the Nature of Agglutinins, Together with Further Observations upon Bacillus Typhi Abdominalis, Bacillus Enteritidis, Bacillus Coli Communis, Bacillus Lactis Aerogenes, and some other Bacilli of Allied Character. Durham H. E., J Exp Med. 1901 Jan 15;5(4):353-88.
- The Campaign Against Ague. Durham H. E., Br Med J. 1901 Mar 2;1(2096):512-3.
- Notes on Beri-beri in the Malay Peninsula and on Christmas Island (Indian Ocean). Durham H. E., J Hyg (Lond). 1903 Jul;3(3):380-1, and 1904 Jan;4(1):112-55.
- Some Notes on the Urine in Beri-Beri. Durham H. E., Br Med J. 1904 Feb 27;1(2252):480-2.
- On subcutaneous injections of adrenalin. Elliott TR, Durham H. E., J. Physiol. 1906 Oct 29;34(6):
- Notes on the Preservation of Fruit. Durham H. E., Br Med J. 1918 Jun 22;1(2999):708.
- Studies on Cider and Perry: No. I. Sulphite Preservatives. Durham H. E., J Hyg (Lond). 1909 Apr;9(1):17-32.
- The Prevalence of Thyroid Enlargement in and about Hereford. Durham H. E., J Hyg (Lond). 1921 Mar;19(4):394-401.
