= Robert Wilton =

British journalist (1868–1925)

Robert Archibald Wilton (31 July 1868 – 18 January 1925) was a British journalist and proponent of antisemitic conspiracy theories in the United Kingdom.

== Biography ==
Wilton, who was born in Cringleford, Norfolk, was the son of a British mining engineer employed in Russia. In 1889 he joined the European staff of the New York Herald, remained with that newspaper for 14 years and reported on both Russian and German affairs. He then took up an appointment as The Times correspondent in Saint Petersburg and became known as a keen observer of events in Russia during the last years of the Tsarist regime. After the Russian Revolution, he moved to Siberia. Following the collapse of the Kolchak government, Wilton managed to escape from Russia and eventually arrived in Paris, where, in 1920, he rejoined the New York Herald. In 1924 he joined the staff of a newly-founded newspaper, the Paris Times, which published in English. He died from cancer at the Hertford British Hospital in Paris early in 1925.

Wilton served with the Russian Army during the First World War and was awarded the Cross of St George.

He was the author of two books: Russia's Agony (published by Edward Arnold, London, 1918) and The Last Days of the Romanovs (1920).

== Аntisemitism ==
Wilton was a right-wing antisemite and sympathetic to the toppled Tsarist system in Russia. He was a proponent of the theory of Jews involved in ritualistic murder, claiming in his 1920 book The Last Days of the Romanovs that the execution of the Romanovs was a ritual murder by the Jews. He was criticized by several liberal British journalists for supporting the attempted military coup by Lavr Kornilov. In 1919 he published "Russia's Agony", which claimed (p. ix) that "Bolshevism is not Russian – it is essentially non-national, its leaders being almost entirely in the league [Jews] that lost its country and its nationhood long ago". According to Semyon Reznik, Wilton was also assisting Russian antisemites in fabrication of photographic evidence of ritual crimes by Jews.
