= Vatican =

Vatican may refer to:

== Geography ==
- Vatican City, an independent city-state surrounded by Rome, governed by the Holy See
  - Vatican Basilica, better known as St. Peter's Basilica
  - Vatican Palace, better known as Apostolic Palace
- Vatican Hill, in Rome, namesake of Vatican City
- Ager Vaticanus, an alluvial plain in Rome

== Institutions ==
- The Holy See, metonymically called as The Vatican or simply as Vatican, the governing body of the worldwide Catholic Church and Vatican City State
- Roman Curia, the administrative apparatus of the Holy See

=== Facilities ===
- Vatican Apostolic Archive
- Vatican Apostolic Library
- Vatican Museums
- Vatican News, including Vatican Media and Vatican Radio
- Vatican Publishing House
- Vatican Athletics
- Vatican City Heliport
- Vatican Railway

== Establishments outside Vatican City and Rome ==
- Vatican Climate Forest in Hungary
- Vatican Advanced Technology Telescope in Arizona, United States
- Vatican, Louisiana, an unincorporated community in the US state of Louisiana

== Other uses ==
- The Vatican (mixtape), by Natas
- Vatican Miracle Examiner, a 2016 Japanese light novel series
