= Stjepan Meštrović =

American sociologist

Stjepan Gabriel Meštrović (born 1955) is a Croatian American sociologist. He is professor of sociology at Texas A&M University. Meštrović has served as an expert witness in war crimes trials, including at the Abu Ghraib torture and prisoner abuse case. He has written over 15 books.

Meštrović was born in Croatia and moved to the United States when he was eight years old. He holds three degrees from Harvard University and a Ph.D. degree from Syracuse University. He began teaching at A&M University in 1986. His uncle is Croatian lobbyist and politician Mate Meštrović. He is a grandson of the Croatian sculptor Ivan Meštrović.

== Selected works ==
- Durkheim and Postmodern Culture (Routledge, 1992). ISBN 978-0-2023-0440-3
- Emile Durkheim and the Reformation of Sociology (Rowman & Littlefield, 1993). ISBN 978-0-8476-7867-9
- Genocide after Emotion: The Post-Emotional Balkan War (Routledge, 1996). ISBN 978-0-4151-2294-8
- Balkanization of the West: The Confluence of Postmodernism and Postcommunism (Routledge, 1993). ISBN 0-203-34464-2
- This Time We Knew: Western Responses to Genocide in Bosnia, co-edited with Thomas Cushman (NYU Press, 1996). ISBN 978-0-8147-1535-2
- Postemotional Society (SAGE, 1997). ISBN 978-0-7619-5129-2
- Anthony Giddens: The Last Modernist (Taylor & Francis, 1998). ISBN 978-0-4150-9573-0
- Trials of Abu Ghraib: An Expert Witness Account of Shame and Honor (Routledge, 2006). ISBN 978-1-5945-1334-3
- The Good Soldier on Trial: A Sociological Study of Misconduct by the Us Military Pertaining to Operation Iron Triangle, Iraq (Algora Publishing, 2009). ISBN 978-0-8758-6742-7
- Strike and Destroy: When Counter-insurgency (COIN) Doctrine Met Hellraisers Brigade Or, the Fate of Corporal Morlock (Algora Publishing, 2012). ISBN 978-0-8758-6910-0
- The Postemotional Bully (SAGE, 2015). ISBN 978-1-4739-1098-0

== See also ==
- Yugoslav Wars
- Texas A&M University
- Ivan Meštrović
