= Hans Ernst August Buchner =

German bacteriologist

Hans Buchner
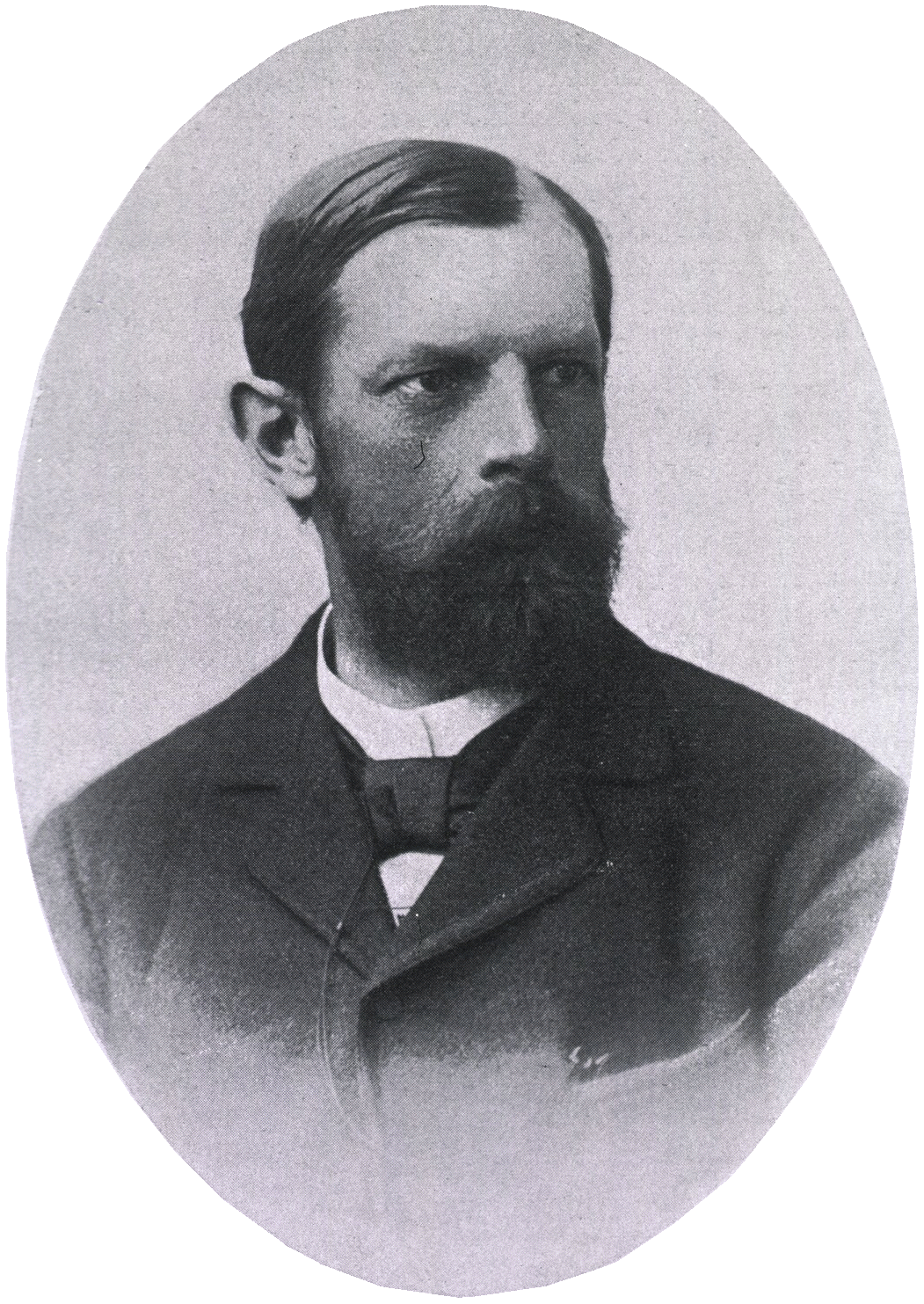
- Hans Ernst August Buchner
- Born: 16 December 1850; Munich, German Confederation
- Died: 5 April 1902 (aged 51); Munich, German Empire
- Education: Leipzig University
- Known for: Discovering complement Work on Gamma globulin Study of anaerobic organisms
- Scientific career
- Workplaces: Ludwig-Maximilians-Universität München

Hans Ernst August Buchner (16 December 1850 – 5 April 1902) was a German bacteriologist who was born and raised in Munich. He was the older brother of Eduard Buchner (1860–1917), winner of the 1907 Nobel Prize in Chemistry.

== Biography ==
He studied medicine at the Ludwig-Maximilians-Universität München and Leipzig University, earning his MD from Leipzig University in 1874. Afterwards, he served as a physician in the Bavarian Army. In 1880, he became a lecturer at the Ludwig-Maximilians-Universität München, where in 1894 he succeeded Max von Pettenkofer (1818–1901) as professor and director of the institute of hygiene. At the Ludwig-Maximilians-Universität München, he was an associate of Max von Gruber (1853–1927).

Buchner was a pioneer in the field of immunology. He was the first to discover a substance in blood serum that was capable of destroying bacteria. He called the substance "alexin", which was later named "complement" by Paul Ehrlich (1854–1915).

In 1888, he introduced the pyrogallic method for cultivation of anaerobic bacteria. Along with Martin Hahn, he assisted his brother, Eduard Buchner, with the isolation of zymase. Their findings were published in a 1903 treatise titled "Die Zymasegärung" (Zymase fermentation).

== Selected writings ==
- Die ätiologische Therapie und Prophylaxe der Lungentuberculose. (Aetiological therapy and prophylaxis involving lung tuberculosis); (1883)
- Über die bakterientödtende Wirkung des zellenfreien Blutserums (On the bacteriological effects of cell-free blood serum); (1889)
- Die Zymasegärung : Untersuchungen über den Inhalt der Hefezellen und die biologische Seite des Gärungsproblems (with Eduard Buchner and Martin Hahn, 1903) - Zymase fermentation : Studies on the content of yeast cells and the biological side of the fermentation problem.
