= Prochaska Affair =

1912 Diplomatic crises

False report on Prochaska's mistreatment, Die Neue Zeitung, 19 November 1912.

The Prochaska Affair (Serbian: афера Прохаска, German: Prochaska-Affäre) refers to Serbian accusations that diplomat Oskar Prochaska (1876–1945), the Austro-Hungarian consul at Prizren in the Ottoman Empire, incited Turk and Albanian populations against Serbia, and then the following the sensational and false reports that Prochaska had been "emasculated" or killed by Serbian troops in November 1912, during the First Balkan War.

Austro-Hungarian consuls in Ottoman territory (such as Prochaska, Pözel, L. Tihi, and others) were engaged in conspiracy against Serbia with Albanians. Prochaska's personal letters were intercepted in October 1912, during the Serbian takeover of Kosovo. The letters spoke of alleged Serbian army massacres in Pristina and called Serbs and Montenegrins "savages" (die Wilden). On 20 November, Serbian general Božidar Janković filed a report following an investigation on Prochaska's alleged anti-Serbian activity, and a meeting between the two where Prochaska left a bad impression and fumbled official procedure and courtesy. Prochaska felt humiliated by a perceived slander by local Russian consul Nikolai Alekseevich Emelianov and the Serbs. Some historians maintain that Prochaska's antagonistic behaviour was sanctioned in order to spark conflict. Norwegian observers described Serbian–Montenegrin treatment of civilians as positive, and challenged Austro-Hungarian propaganda and false claims that were disseminated in European press.

There were sensational and false reports that Prochaska had been "emasculated" or killed by Serbian troops in November 1912. It shook public opinion in Austria-Hungary. The Ballhausplatz (Austrian Cabinet) sent special envoy Theodor Edel to enquire; the Serbian consul Milan Rakić who accompanied him reported that there were no complaints about mistreatment of Catholic Albanian clergy, and that alleged atrocities against Albanians were "basically false or exaggerated accusations". The false reports were used as a fact by controversial Koloman Kánia, the head of the Austro-Hungarian Press Bureau, to incite hatred against Serbs in an anti-Serbian campaign and warmongering. The affair became a major European diplomatic crisis, and brought Austria-Hungary and Serbia closer to conflict that followed in World War I. Austria-Hungary used false reports and propaganda to portray the coming invasion of Serbia as humanitarian.

In 1922, Prochaska requested that any "harmful papers" relating to the Prizren incident be removed. Prochaska was assessed to have been a catastrophic diplomat.

== See also ==
- Bosnian Crisis
- Schutzkorps
- Assassination of Archduke Franz Ferdinand
- Causes of World War I

== Sources ==
- Bjelajac, Mile (2019). "The Austro-Hungarian Creation of a "Humanitarian" Pretext for the Planned Invasion of Serbia in 1912–1913: Facts and Counter-Facts". Balcanica. 50: 131–156.
- Kann, Robert A. (1977). Die Prochaska-Affäre vom Herbst 1912: zwischen kaltem u. heissem Krieg. Verlag d. Österr. Akad. d. Wiss. ISBN 978-3-7001-0215-1.
- Mörsdorf, Sven (2022). "The Prochaska Affair Revisited: Towards a Revaluation of Austria-Hungary's Balkan Consuls". The Hungarian historical review: new series of Acta Historica Academiae Scientiarum Hungaricae. 11 (2): 305–328.
