= Läkartidningen =

- Discipline: Medicine
- Language: Swedish

Publication details
- History: 1965 to present
- Publisher: Sveriges Läkarförbund (Sweden)

Standard abbreviations
- ISO 4: Läkartidningen

Indexing
- ISSN: 0023-7205

Links
- Journal homepage

Läkartidningen is a Swedish medical journal which was first published in 1965 by the Sveriges Läkarförbund (Swedish Medical Association), an organisation founded in 1904.
