= Leo Freundlich =

Austrian–Czech journalist and politician

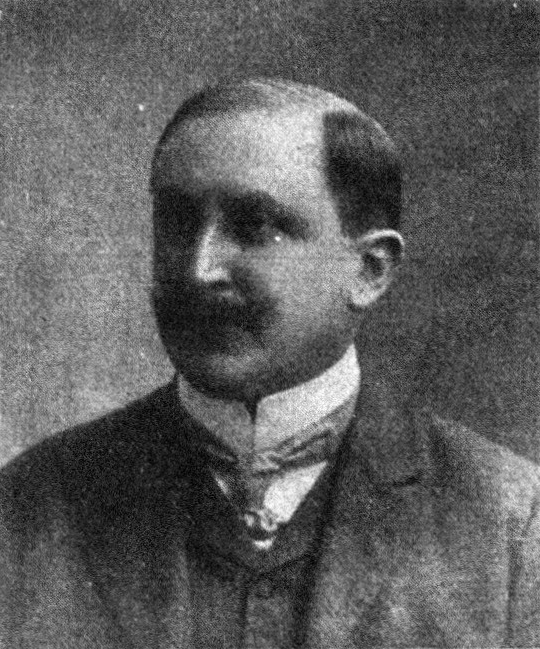
- Leo Freundlich in 1907

Member of the Imperial Council
- In office 1907–1911

Personal details
- Born: 23 April 1875 Bielitz-Biala, Austria-Hungary (now Poland)
- Died: 12 February 1953 (aged 77)
- Party: Social Democratic Party of Austria
- Spouse: Emmy Freundlich (m. 1900; div. 1911)

Leo Freundlich (23 April 1875 – 12 February 1953) was a journalist and politician from Austria-Hungary and later Austria of German ethnicity and Jewish origin. In the early 20th century, he was a social democratic member of the Imperial Council. In the interwar period, he was the diplomatic representative of Albania in Austria.

== Biography ==
Freundlich was born on 23 April 1875. He was born in Bielsko-Biała, Galicia, in a Jewish family. He was active in the socialist movement from a young age. He worked as an editor of the workers' press in Ústí nad Labem. Here he met his future wife, Emmy Freundlich (1878–1948), the daughter of the former mayor of Ústí nad Labem, Kögler. They married in Scotland in 1900 and moved to Šumperk. Both spouses were publicly and politically active. They participated in the establishment of a consumer cooperative. Leo Freundlich published the leftist paper Volkswacht. He was imprisoned for three weeks for verbal attacks on the Catholic Church.

At the beginning of the century, he became involved in national politics. In the elections to the Imperial Council in 1907, held for the first time under universal and equal suffrage, he won a mandate in the Imperial Council (national legislature) for the German electoral district of Morava 16. He joined the parliamentary faction of the Social Democratic Party of Austria. He introduced himself professionally as editor-in-chief.

Shortly after his departure from the Reichstag, Leo Freundlich divorced his wife Emma, who then permanently profiled herself as a prominent figure in the Austrian labor movement and cooperatives. In 1911–1912, Leo Freundlich dealt extensively with the Albanian question in Vienna. He published a set of analyses on Albanian ethnicity and spoke sympathetically of Albanian national aspirations. Most notably, his book Albania's Golgotha in 1913 presented a series of reports on the massacres of Albanians by Serbian troops during the Balkan Wars.

In the interwar period, Freundlich worked in Vienna as Albania's press secretary. Ahmet Zogu chose him for this position. He was even involved in the unsuccessful selection of a wife for the Albanian ruler, and in the 1930s he lobbied for Albanian business interests in Central Europe. He lived in Vienna until August 1938, but due to escalating racial persecution in Nazi Germany, he moved to Switzerland, where he worked in the Albanian representation at the League of Nations in Geneva. He remained here even during World War II, when he lived in poor conditions and was financially supported by his two daughters who lived in New York City. When the Communists took power in Albania after the war, he tried unsuccessfully to appeal to the Deputy Prime Minister, Koçi Xoxe, with the wish to become the Albanian Honorary Consul in Vienna. He died in 1953 near Geneva.
