= Blood compatibility testing =

Testing to identify incompatibilities between blood types

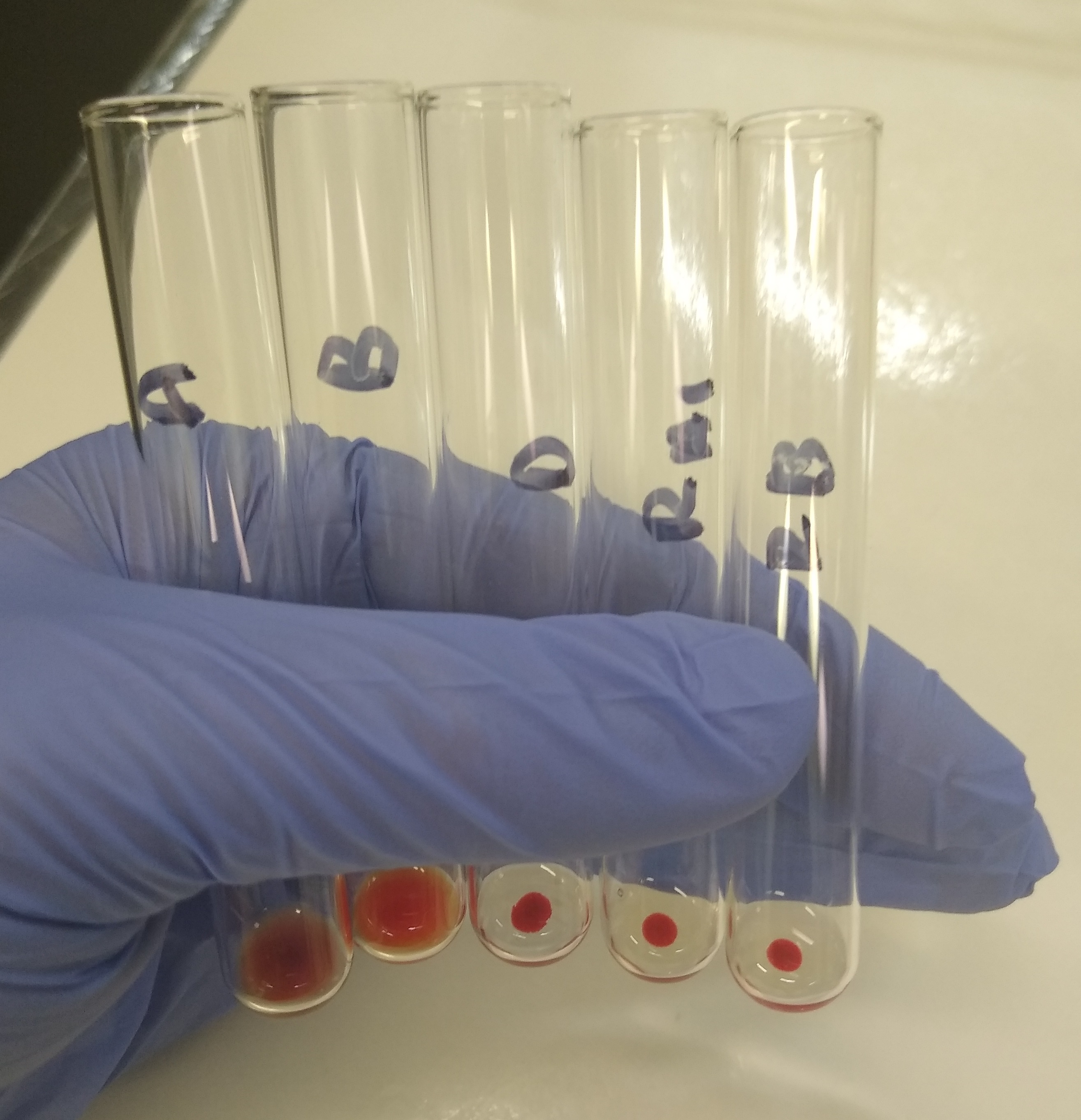
- O positive blood type determined by the tube method. From left to right: The patient's red blood cells do not agglutinate with the anti-A and anti-B reagents, but do agglutinate with the anti-D reagent. The patient's plasma agglutinates type A1 and B red blood cells.
- Purpose: Identifying incompatibilities between blood groups
- Test of: Red blood cells; blood plasma
- MedlinePlus: 003345
- eMedicine: 1731198
- LOINC: 34532-2, 883–9, 10331-7

Blood compatibility testing is conducted in a medical laboratory to identify potential incompatibilities between blood group systems in blood transfusion. It is also used to diagnose and prevent some complications of pregnancy that can occur when the baby has a different blood group from the mother. Blood compatibility testing includes blood typing, which detects the antigens on red blood cells that determine a person's blood type; testing for unexpected antibodies against blood group antigens (antibody screening and identification); and, in the case of blood transfusions, mixing the recipient's plasma with the donor's red blood cells to detect incompatibilities (crossmatching). Routine blood typing involves determining the ABO and RhD (Rh factor) type, (Note: The RhD antigen is commonly known as the "Rh factor", although there are several other antigens in the Rh antigen system.) and involves both identification of ABO antigens on red blood cells (forward grouping) and identification of ABO antibodies in the plasma (reverse grouping). Other blood group antigens may be tested for in specific clinical situations.

Blood compatibility testing makes use of reactions between blood group antigens and antibodies—specifically the ability of antibodies to cause red blood cells to clump together when they bind to antigens on the cell surface, a phenomenon called agglutination. Techniques that rely on antigen-antibody reactions are termed serologic methods, and several such methods are available, ranging from manual testing using test tubes or slides to fully automated systems. Blood types can also be determined through genetic testing, which is used when conditions that interfere with serologic testing are present or when a high degree of accuracy in antigen identification is required.

Several conditions can cause false or inconclusive results in blood compatibility testing. When these issues affect ABO typing, they are called ABO discrepancies. ABO discrepancies must be investigated and resolved before the person's blood type is reported. Other sources of error include the "weak D" phenomenon, in which people who are positive for the RhD antigen show weak or negative reactions when tested for RhD, and the presence of immunoglobulin G antibodies on red blood cells, which can interfere with antibody screening, crossmatching, and typing for some blood group antigens.

== Medical uses ==
Blood compatibility testing is routinely performed before a blood transfusion. The full compatibility testing process involves ABO and RhD (Rh factor) typing; screening for antibodies against other blood group systems; and crossmatching, which involves testing the recipient's blood plasma against the donor's red blood cells as a final check for incompatibility. If an unexpected blood group antibody is detected, further testing is warranted to identify the antibody and ensure that the donor blood is negative for the relevant antigen. Serologic crossmatching may be omitted if the recipient's antibody screen is negative, there is no history of clinically significant antibodies, and their ABO/Rh type has been confirmed against historical records or against a second blood sample; and in emergencies, blood may be transfused before any compatibility testing results are available.

Blood compatibility testing is often performed on pregnant women and on the cord blood from newborn babies, because incompatibility puts the baby at risk for developing hemolytic disease of the newborn. It is also used before hematopoietic stem cell transplantation, because blood group incompatibility can be responsible for some cases of acute graft-versus-host disease.

== Principles ==
ABO antigens and antibodies

Blood types are defined according to the presence or absence of specific antigens on the surface of red blood cells. The most important of these in medicine are the ABO and RhD antigens but many other blood group systems exist and may be clinically relevant in some situations. As of 2021, 43 blood groups are officially recognized.

People who lack certain blood group antigens on their red cells can form antibodies against these antigens. For example, a person with type A blood will produce antibodies against the B antigen. The ABO blood group antibodies are naturally occurring, meaning that they are found in people who have not been exposed to incompatible blood. Antibodies to most other blood group antigens, including RhD, develop after people are exposed to the antigens through transfusion or pregnancy. Some of these antibodies can bind to incompatible red blood cells and cause them to be destroyed, resulting in transfusion reactions and other complications.

Serologic methods for blood compatibility testing make use of these antibody-antigen reactions. In blood typing, reagents containing blood group antibodies, called antisera, are added to suspensions of blood cells. If the relevant antigen is present, the antibodies in the reagent will cause the red blood cells to agglutinate (clump together), which can be identified visually. In antibody screening, the individual's plasma is tested against a set of red blood cells with known antigen profiles; if the plasma agglutinates one of the red blood cells in the panel, this indicates that the individual has an antibody against one of the antigens present on the cells. In crossmatching, a prospective transfusion recipient's plasma is added to the donor red blood cells and observed for agglutination (or hemolysis) to detect antibodies that could cause transfusion reactions.

Blood group antibodies occur in two major forms: immunoglobulin M (IgM) and immunoglobulin G (IgG). Antibodies that are predominantly IgM, such as the ABO antibodies, typically cause immediate agglutination of red blood cells at room temperature. Therefore, a person's ABO blood type can be determined by simply adding the red blood cells to the reagent and centrifuging or mixing the sample, and in crossmatching, incompatibility between ABO types can be detected immediately after centrifugation. RhD typing also typically uses IgM reagents although anti-RhD usually occurs as IgG in the body. Antibodies that are predominantly IgG, such as those directed towards antigens of the Duffy and Kidd systems, generally do not cause immediate agglutination because the small size of the IgG antibody prevents formation of a lattice structure. Therefore, blood typing using IgG antisera and detection of IgG antibodies requires use of the indirect antiglobulin test to demonstrate IgG bound to red blood cells.

In the indirect antiglobulin test, the mixture of antiserum or plasma and red blood cells is incubated at 37 °C (99 °F), the ideal temperature for reactivity of IgG antibodies. After incubation, the red blood cells are washed with saline to remove unbound antibodies, and anti-human globulin reagent is added. If IgG antibodies have bound to antigens on the cell surface, anti-human globulin will bind to those antibodies, causing the red blood cells to agglutinate after centrifugation. If the reaction is negative, "check cells"—reagent cells coated with IgG—are added to ensure that the test is working correctly. If the test result is indeed negative, the check cells should react with the unbound anti-human globulin and demonstrate agglutination.

== Blood typing ==
=== ABO and Rh typing ===
In ABO and Rh typing, reagents containing antibodies against the A, B, and RhD antigens are added to suspensions of blood cells. If the relevant antigen is present, the red blood cells will demonstrate visible agglutination (clumping). In addition to identifying the ABO antigens, which is termed forward grouping, routine ABO blood typing also includes identification of the ABO antibodies in the person's plasma. This is called reverse grouping, and it is done to confirm the ABO blood type. In reverse grouping, the person's plasma is added to type A_{1} and type B red blood cells. The plasma should agglutinate the cells that express antigens that the person lacks, while failing to agglutinate cells that express the same antigens as the patient. For example, the plasma of someone with type A blood should react with type B red cells, but not with A_{1} cells. If the expected results do not occur, further testing is required. Agglutination is scored from 1+ to 4+ based on the strength of the reaction. In ABO typing, a score of 3+ or 4+ indicates a positive reaction, while a score of 1+ or 2+ is inconclusive and requires further investigation.

=== Other blood group systems ===
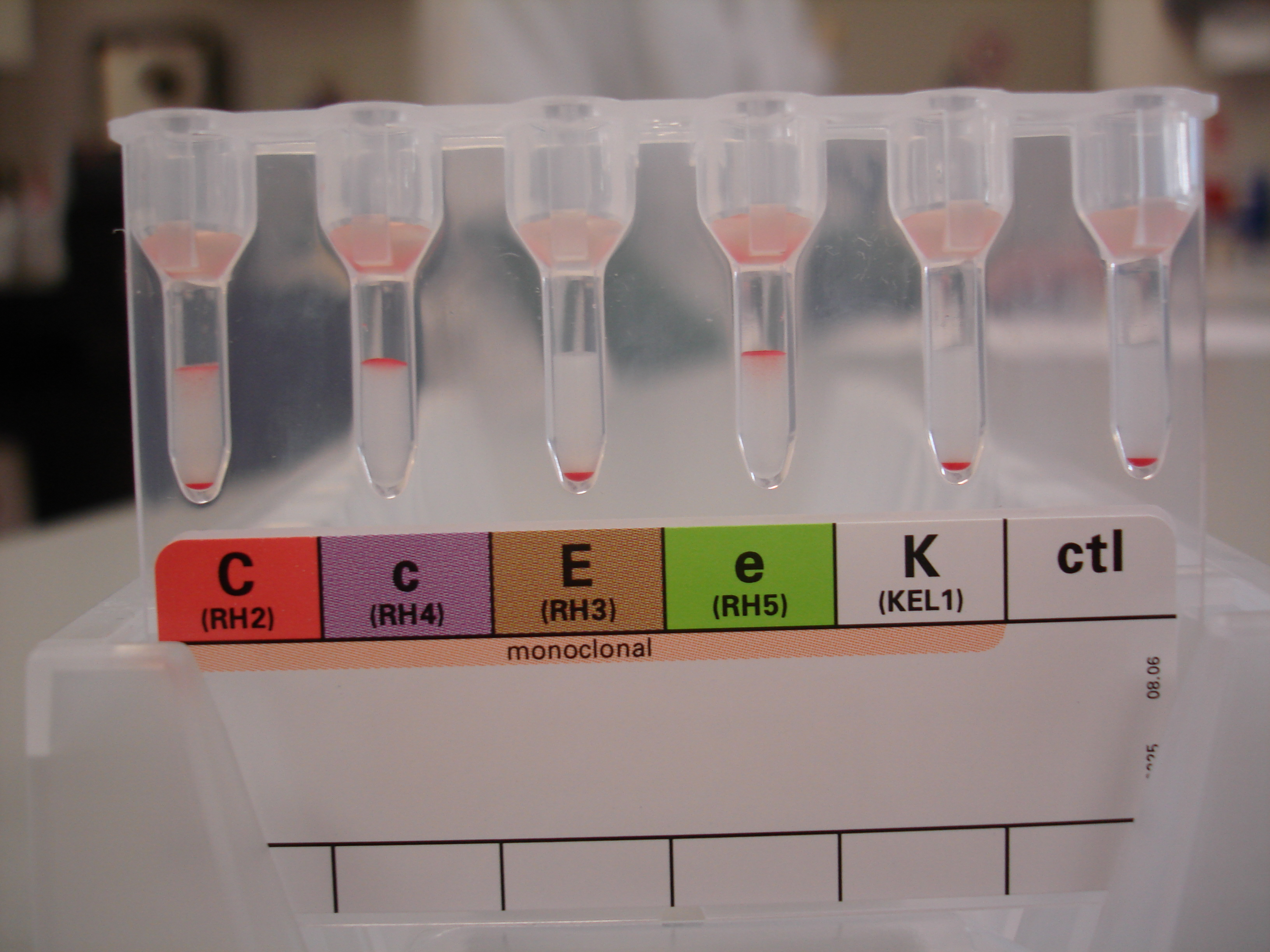
Blood typing for the RhC/c, RhE/e and K antigens

Prior to receiving a blood transfusion, individuals are screened for the presence of antibodies against antigens of non-ABO blood group systems. Blood group antigens besides ABO and RhD that are significant in transfusion medicine include the RhC/c and E/e antigens and the antigens of the Duffy, Kell, Kidd, and MNS systems. If a clinically significant antibody is identified, the recipient must be transfused with blood that is negative for the corresponding antigen to prevent a transfusion reaction. This requires the donor units to be typed for the relevant antigen. The recipient may also be typed for the antigen to confirm the identity of the antibody, as only individuals who are negative for a blood group antigen should produce antibodies against it.

In Europe, females who require blood transfusions are often typed for the Kell and extended Rh antigens to prevent sensitization to these antigens, which could put them at risk for developing hemolytic disease of the newborn during pregnancy. The American Society of Hematology recommends that people with sickle cell disease have their blood typed for the RhC/c, RhE/e, Kell, Duffy, Kidd, and MNS antigens prior to transfusion, because they often require transfusions and may become sensitized to these antigens if transfused with mismatched blood. Extended red blood cell phenotyping is also recommended for people with beta-thalassemia. Blood group systems other than ABO and Rh have a relatively small risk of complications when blood is mixed, so in emergencies such as major hemorrhage, the urgency of transfusion can exceed the need for compatibility testing against other blood group systems (and potentially Rh as well).

== Antibody screening and identification ==
Antibodies to most blood group antigens besides those of the ABO system develop after exposure to incompatible blood. Such "unexpected" blood group antibodies are only found in 0.8–2% of people; however, recipients of blood transfusions must be screened for these antibodies to prevent transfusion reactions. Antibody screening is also performed as part of prenatal care, because antibodies against RhD and other blood group antigens can cause hemolytic disease of the newborn, and because Rh-negative mothers who have developed an anti-RhD antibody are not eligible to receive Rho(D) immune globulin (Rhogam).

In the antibody screening procedure, an individual's plasma is added to a panel of two or three sets of red blood cells which have been chosen to express most clinically significant blood group antigens. Only group O cells are used in antibody screening, as otherwise the cells would react with the naturally occurring ABO blood group antibodies. The mixture of plasma and red cells is incubated at 37 °C and tested via the indirect antiglobulin test. Some antibody screening and identification protocols incorporate a phase of testing after incubation at room temperature, but this is often omitted because most unexpected antibodies that react at room temperature are clinically insignificant.

Agglutination of the screening cells by the plasma, with or without the addition of anti-human globulin, indicates that an unexpected blood group antibody is present. If this occurs, further testing using more cells (usually 10–11) is necessary to identify the antibody. By examining the antigen profiles of the red blood cells the person's plasma reacts with, it is possible to determine the antibody's identity. An "autocontrol", in which the individual's plasma is tested against their own red cells, is included to determine whether the agglutination is due to an alloantibody (an antibody against a foreign antigen), an autoantibody (an antibody against one's own antigens), or another interfering substance.

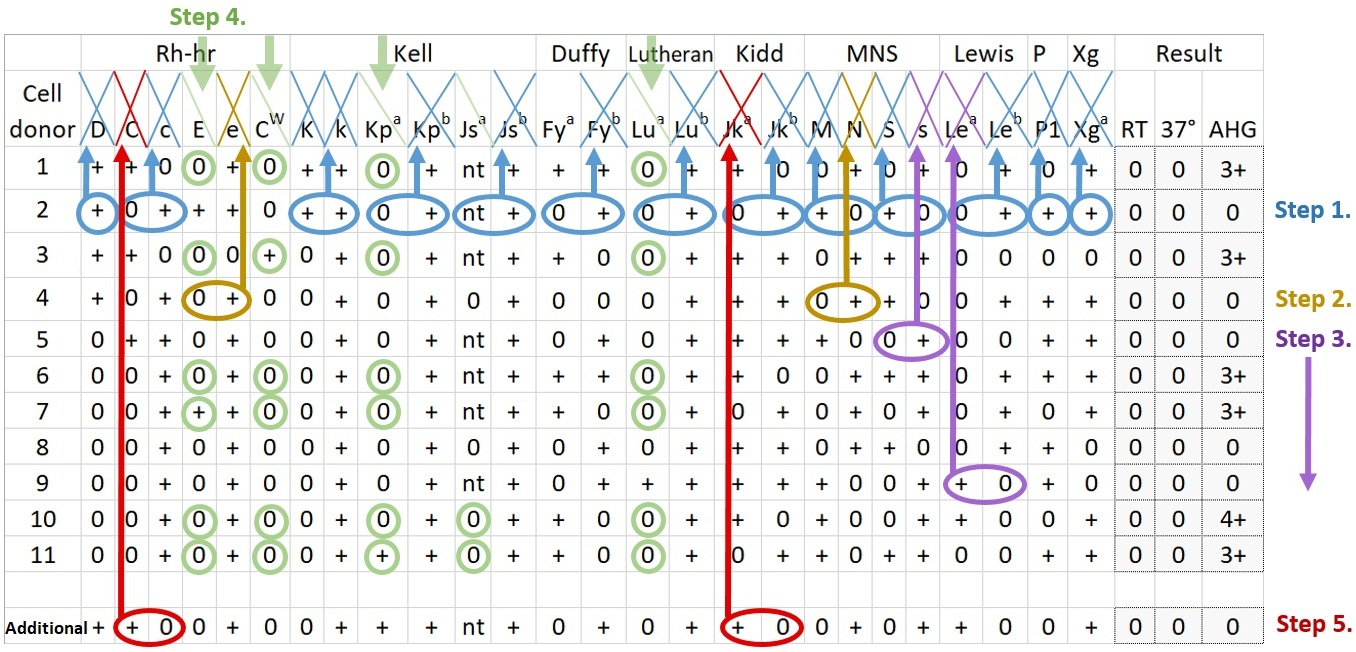

The image above shows the interpretation of an antibody panel used in serology to detect antibodies towards the most relevant blood group antigens. Each row represents "reference" or "control" red blood cells of donors which have known antigen compositions and are ABO group O. The + symbol means that the antigen is present on the reference red blood cells, and 0 means it is absent; nt means "not tested". The "result" column to the right displays reactivity when mixing reference red blood cells with plasma from the patient in 3 different phases: room temperature, 37 °C and AHG (with anti-human globulin, by the indirect antiglobulin test).

- Step 1; Annotated in blue: starting to exclude antigens without reaction in all 3 phases; looking at the first reference cell row with no reaction (0 in column at right, in this case cell donor 2), and excluding (here marked by X) each present antigen where the other pair is either practically non-existent (such as for DT) or 0 (presence is homozygous, in this case homozygous c).
  When both pairs are + (heterozygous cases), they are both excluded (here marked by X), except for C/c, E/e, Duffy, Kidd and MNS antigens (where antibodies of the patient may still react towards blood cells with homozygous antigen expression, because homozygous expression results in a higher dosage of the antigen). Thus, in this case, E/e is not excluded in this row, while K/k is, as well as Js^{b} (regardless of what Js^{a} would have shown). (Note: Besides from C/c, E/e, Duffy, Kidd and MNS, clinically significant dosage effects is rare but not impossible for other antigens, which thus may still be considered if subsequent cross-matching is reactive.)
- Step 2: Annotated in brown: Going to the next reference cell row with a negative reaction (in this case cell donor 4), and repeating for each antigen type that is not already excluded.
- Step 3: Annotated in purple. Repeating the same for each reference cell row with negative reaction.
- Step 4: Discounting antigens that were absent in all or almost all reactive cases (here marked with \). These are often antigens with low prevalence, and while there is a possibility of such antibodies being produced, they are generally not the type that is responsible for the reactivity at hand.
- Step 5: Comparing the remaining possible antigens for a most likely culprit (in this case Fy^{a}), and selectively ruling out significant differential antigens, such as with the shown additional donor cell type that is known to not contain Fy^{a} but contains C and Jk^{a}.

In this case, the antibody panel shows that anti-Fy^{a} antibodies are present. This indicates that donor blood typed to be negative for the Fy^{a} antigen must be used. Still, if a subsequent cross-matching shows reactivity, additional testing should be done against previously discounted antigens (in this case potentially E, C^{W}, Kp^{a} and/or Lu^{a}).

Hemagglutination inhibition
Neutralizing substance	Antigen cancelled
Hydatid cyst fluid; Pigeon eggs	P_{1}
Saliva	H, Le_{a}
Breast milk	I
Guinea pig urine	Sd^{a}

When multiple antibodies are present, or when an antibody is directed against a high-frequency antigen, the normal antibody panel procedure may not provide a conclusive identification. In these cases, hemagglutination inhibition can be used, wherein a neutralizing substance cancels out a specific antigen. Alternatively, the plasma may be incubated with cells of known antigen profiles in order to remove a specific antibody (a process termed adsorption); or the cells can be treated with enzymes such as ficain or papain which inhibit the reactivity of some blood group antibodies and enhance others. The effect of ficain and papain on major blood group systems is as follows:

- Enhanced: ABO, Rh, Kidd, Lewis, P1, Ii
- Destroyed: Duffy (Fy^{a} and Fy^{b}), Lutheran, MNS
- Unaffected: Kell

People who have tested positive for an unexpected blood group antibody in the past may not exhibit a positive reaction on subsequent testing; however, if the antibody is clinically significant, they must be transfused with antigen-negative blood regardless.

== Crossmatching ==
Crossmatching, which is routinely performed before a blood transfusion, involves adding the recipient's blood plasma to a sample of the donor's red blood cells. If the blood is incompatible, the antibodies in the recipient's plasma will bind to antigens on the donor red blood cells. This antibody-antigen reaction can be detected through visible clumping or destruction of the red blood cells, or by reaction with anti-human globulin, after centrifugation.

If the transfusion recipient has a negative antibody screen and no history of antibodies, an "immediate spin" crossmatch is often performed: the red blood cells and plasma are centrifuged immediately after mixing as a final check for incompatibility between ABO blood types. If a clinically significant antibody is detected (or was in the past), or if the immediate spin crossmatch demonstrates incompatibility, a "full" or "IgG crossmatch" is performed, which uses the indirect antiglobulin test to detect blood group incompatibility caused by IgG antibodies. The IgG crossmatching procedure is more lengthy than the immediate spin crossmatch, and in some cases may take more than two hours.

Individuals who have a negative antibody screen and no history of antibodies may also undergo an "electronic crossmatch", provided that their ABO and Rh type has been determined from the current blood sample and that the results of another ABO/Rh type are on record. In this case, the recipient's blood type is simply compared against that of the donor blood, without any need for serologic testing. In emergencies, blood may be issued before crossmatching is complete.

== Methods ==
=== Tube and slide methods ===
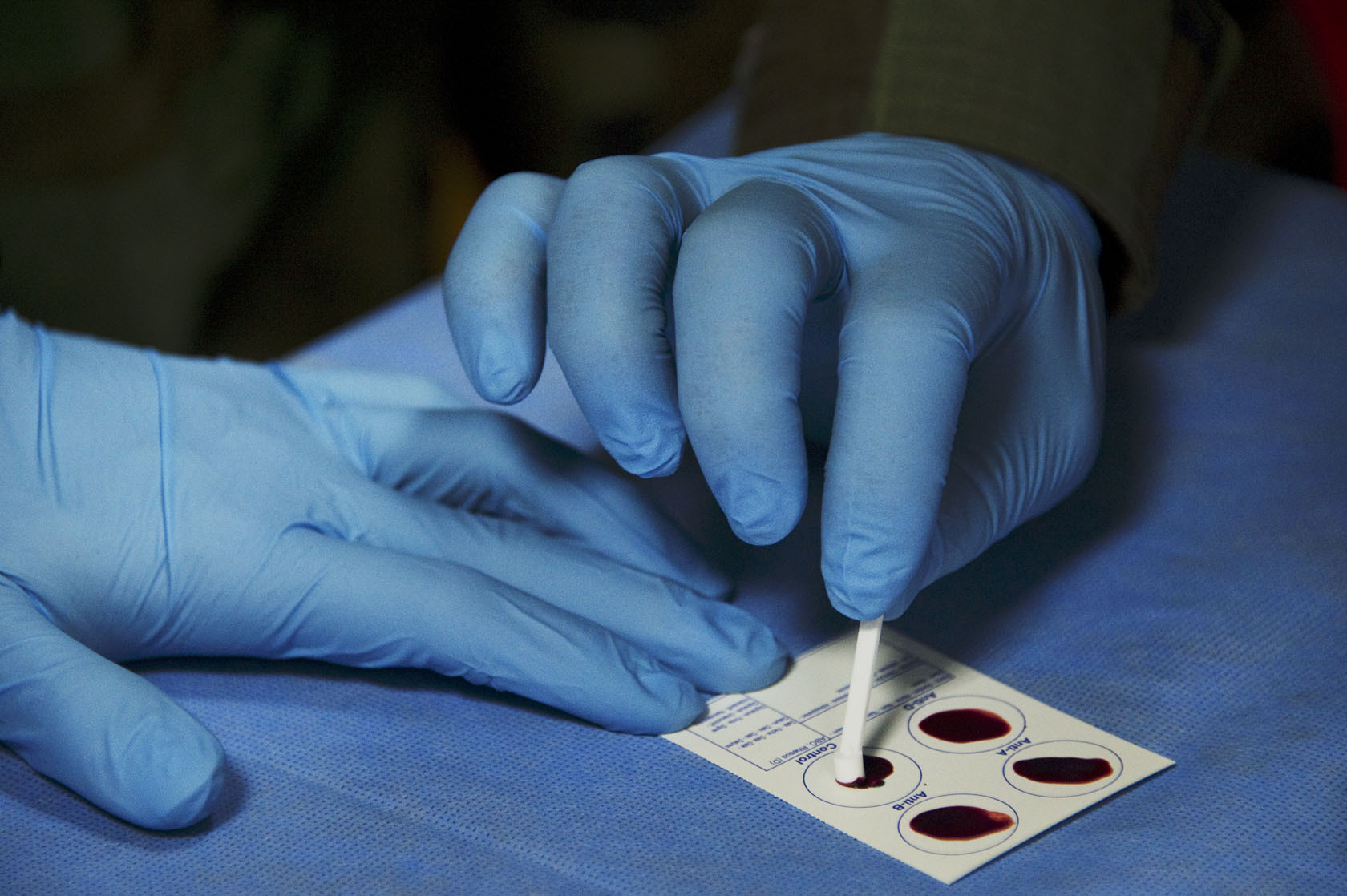
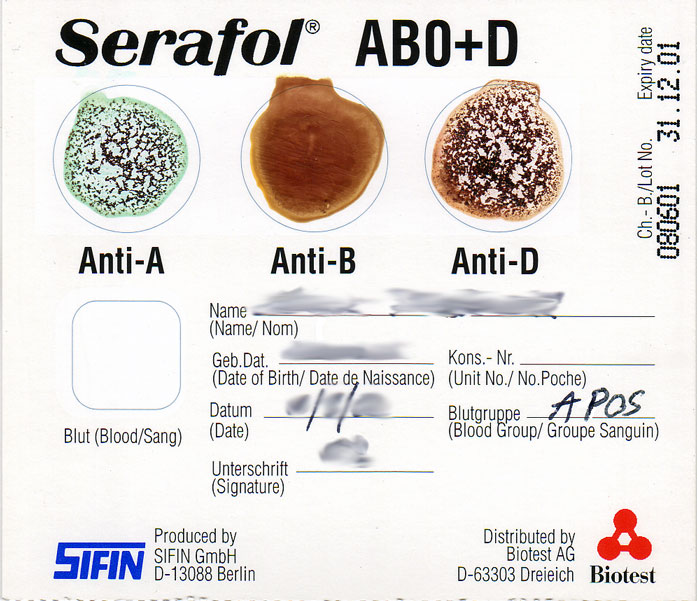
Blood typing by slide method: type A positive

Blood typing can be performed using test tubes, microplates, or blood typing slides. The tube method involves mixing a suspension of red blood cells with antisera (or plasma, for reverse grouping) in a test tube. The mixture is centrifuged to separate the cells from the reagent, and then resuspended by gently agitating the tube. If the antigen of interest is present, the red blood cells agglutinate, forming a solid clump in the tube. If it is absent, the red blood cells go back into suspension when mixed. The microplate method is similar to the tube method, except rather than using individual test tubes, blood typing is carried out in a plate containing dozens of wells, allowing multiple tests to be performed at the same time. The agglutination reactions are read after the plate is centrifuged.

Antibody screening and identification can also be carried out by the tube method. In this procedure, the plasma and red cells are mixed together in a tube containing a medium that enhances agglutination reactions, such as low ionic strength saline (LISS). The tubes are incubated at body temperature for a defined period of time, then centrifuged and examined for agglutination or hemolysis; first immediately following the incubation period, and then after washing and addition of anti-human globulin reagent. Crossmatching, likewise, may be performed by the tube method; the reactions are read immediately after centrifugation in the immediate spin crossmatch, or after incubation and addition of AHG in the full crossmatching procedure.

The slide method for blood typing involves mixing a drop of blood with a drop of antisera on a slide. The slide is tilted to mix the cells and reagents together and then observed for agglutination, which indicates a positive result. This method is typically used in under-resourced areas or emergency situations; otherwise, alternative methods are preferred.

=== Column agglutination ===
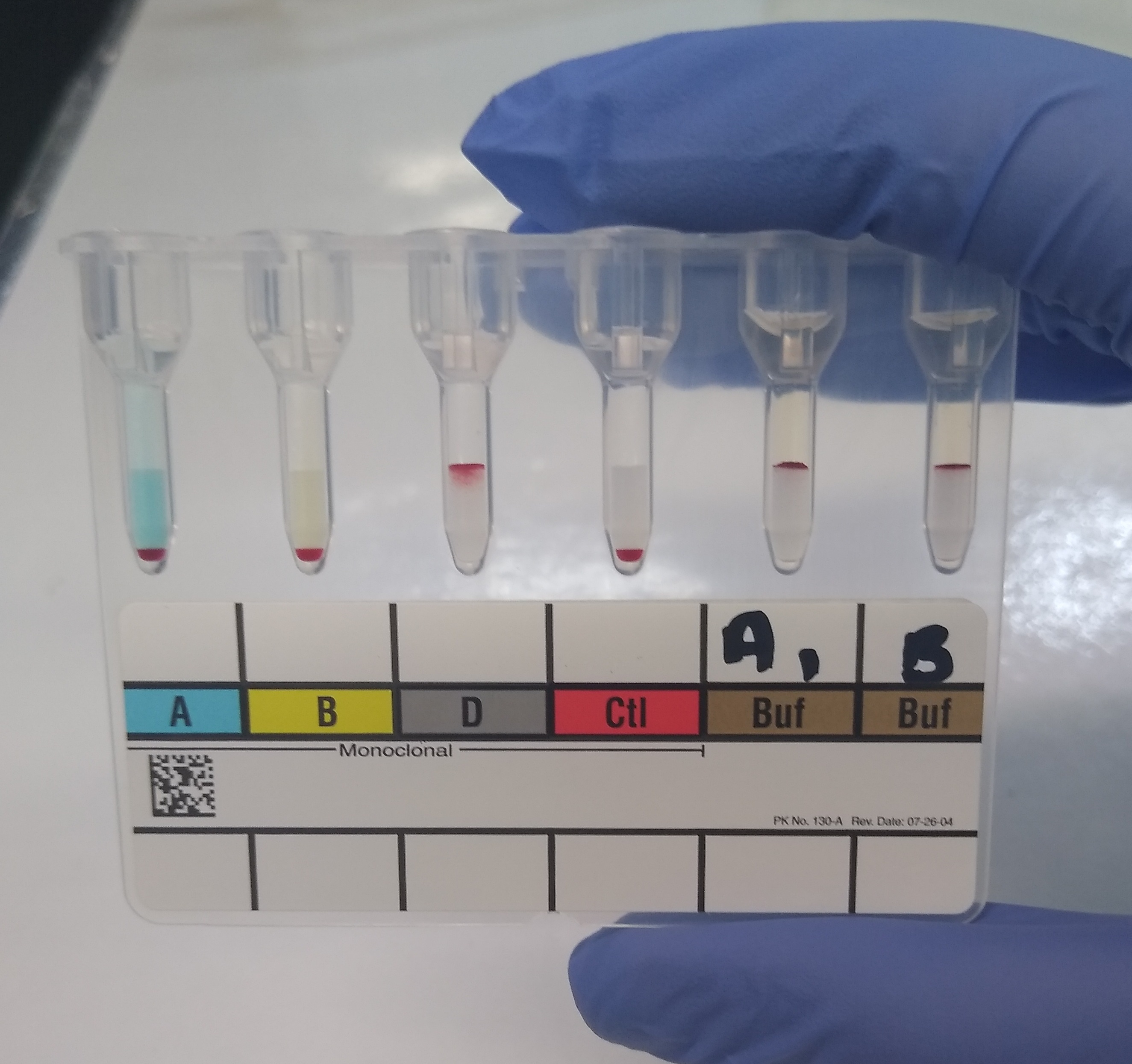
Blood typing by column agglutination method: type O positive

Column agglutination techniques for blood compatibility testing (sometimes called the "gel test") use cards containing columns of dextran-polyacrylamide gel. Cards designed for blood typing contain pre-dispensed blood typing reagents for forward grouping, and wells containing only a buffer solution, to which reagent red blood cells and plasma are added, for reverse grouping. Antibody screening and crossmatching can also be carried out by column agglutination, in which case cards containing anti-human globulin reagent are used. The gel cards are centrifuged (sometimes after incubation, depending on the test), during which red blood cell agglutinates become trapped at the top of the column because they are too large to migrate through the gel. Cells that have not agglutinated collect on the bottom. Therefore, a line of red blood cells at the top of the column indicates a positive result. The strength of positive reactions is scored from 1+ to 4+ depending on how far the cells have travelled through the gel. The gel test has advantages over manual methods in that it eliminates the variability associated with manually re-suspending the cells and that the cards can be kept as a record of the test. The column agglutination method is used by some automated analyzers to perform blood typing automatically. These analyzers pipette red blood cells and plasma onto gel cards, centrifuge them, and scan and read the agglutination reactions to determine the blood type.

=== Solid-phase assay ===
Solid-phase assays (sometimes called the "antigen capture" method) use reagent antigens or antibodies affixed to a surface (usually a microplate). Microplate wells coated with anti-A, -B and -D reagents are used for forward grouping. The test sample is added and the microplate is centrifuged; in a positive reaction, the red blood cells adhere to the surface of the well. Some automated analyzers use solid phase assays for blood typing.

=== Genotyping ===
Genetic testing can be used to determine a person's blood type in certain situations where serologic testing is insufficient. For example, if a person has been transfused with large volumes of donor blood, the results of serologic testing will reflect the antigens on the donor cells and not the person's actual blood type. Individuals who produce antibodies against their own red blood cells or who are treated with certain drugs may show spurious agglutination reactions in serologic testing, so genotyping may be necessary to determine their blood type accurately. Genetic testing is required for typing red blood cell antigens for which no commercial antisera are available.

The AABB recommends red cell genotyping for women with serologic weak D phenotypes who have the potential to bear children. This is because people with some weak D phenotypes can produce antibodies against the RhD antigen, while people with some other weak D phenotypes cannot. Such antibodies can cause hemolytic disease of the fetus and the newborn (HDFN). Genotyping can identify the specific type of weak D antigen, which determines the potential for the person to produce antibodies, thus avoiding unnecessary treatment with Rho(D) immune globulin. Genotyping is preferred to serologic testing for people with sickle cell disease, because it is more accurate for certain antigens and can identify antigens that cannot be detected by serologic methods.

Genotyping is also used in prenatal testing for hemolytic disease of the newborn. When a pregnant woman has a blood group antibody that can cause HDN, the fetus can be typed for the relevant antigen to determine if it is at risk of developing the disease. Because it is impractical to draw blood from the fetus, the blood type is determined using an amniocentesis sample or cell-free fetal DNA isolated from the mother's blood. The father may also be genotyped to predict the risk of hemolytic disease of the newborn, because if the father is homozygous for the relevant antigen (meaning having two copies of the gene) the baby will be positive for the antigen and thus at risk of developing the disease. If the father is heterozygous (having only one copy), the baby only has a 50% chance of being positive for the antigen.

== Limitations ==
=== ABO discrepancies ===
In ABO typing, the results of the forward and reverse grouping should always correspond with each other. An unexpected difference between the two results is termed an ABO discrepancy, and must be resolved before the person's blood type is reported.

==== Forward grouping ====
Weak reactions in the forward grouping may occur in people who belong to certain ABO subgroups—variant blood types characterized by decreased expression of the A or B antigens or changes in their structure. Weakened expression of ABO antigens may also occur in leukemia and Hodgkin's lymphoma. Weak reactions in forward grouping can be strengthened by incubating the blood and reagent mixture at room temperature or 4 °C (39 °F), or by using certain enzymes to enhance the antigen-antibody reactions.

Occasionally, two populations of red blood cells are apparent after reaction with the blood typing antisera. Some of the red blood cells are agglutinated, while others are not, making it difficult to interpret the result. This is called a mixed field reaction, and it can occur if someone has recently received a blood transfusion with a different blood type (as in a type A patient receiving type O blood), if they have received a bone marrow or stem cell transplant from someone with a different blood type, or in patients with certain ABO subgroups, such as A_{3}. Investigation of the person's medical history can clarify the cause of the mixed field reaction.

People with cold agglutinin disease produce antibodies against their own red blood cells that cause them to spontaneously agglutinate at room temperature, leading to false positive reactions in forward grouping. Cold agglutinins can usually be deactivated by warming the sample to 37 °C (99 °F) and washing the red blood cells with saline. If this is not effective, dithiothreitol can be used to destroy the antibodies.

Cord blood samples may be contaminated with Wharton's jelly, a viscous substance that can cause red blood cells to stick together, mimicking agglutination. Wharton's jelly can be removed by thoroughly washing the red blood cells.

In a rare phenomenon known as "acquired B antigen", a patient whose true blood type is A may show a weak positive result for B in the forward grouping. This condition, which is associated with gastrointestinal diseases such as colon cancer and intestinal obstruction, results from conversion of the A antigen to a structure mimicking the B antigen by bacterial enzymes. Unlike the true B antigen, acquired B antigen does not react with reagents within a certain pH range.

==== Reverse grouping ====
Infants under 3 to 6 months of age exhibit missing or weak reactions in reverse grouping because they produce very low levels of ABO antibodies. Therefore, reverse grouping is generally not performed for this age group. Elderly people may also exhibit decreased antibody production, as may people with hypogammaglobulinemia. Weak reactions can be strengthened by allowing the plasma and red cells to incubate at room temperature for 15 to 30 minutes, and if this is not effective, they can be incubated at 4 °C (39 °F).

Approximately 20% of individuals with the blood type A or AB belong to a subgroup of A, termed A_{2}, while the more common subgroup, encompassing approximately 80% of individuals, is termed A_{1}. Because of small differences in the structure of the A_{1} and A_{2} antigens, some individuals in the A_{2} subgroup can produce an antibody against A_{1}. Therefore, these individuals will type as A or AB in the forward grouping, but will exhibit an unexpected positive reaction with the type A_{1} red cells in the reverse grouping. The discrepancy can be resolved by testing the person's red blood cells with an anti-A_{1} reagent, which will give a negative result if the patient belongs to the A_{2} subgroup. Anti-A_{1} antibodies are considered clinically insignificant unless they react at 37 °C (99 °F). Other subgroups of A exist, as well as subgroups of B, but they are rarely encountered.

If high levels of protein are present in a person's plasma, a phenomenon known as rouleaux may occur when their plasma is added to the reagent cells. Rouleaux causes red blood cells to stack together, which can mimic agglutination, causing a false positive result in the reverse grouping. This can be avoided by removing the plasma, replacing it with saline, and re-centrifuging the tube. Rouleaux will disappear once the plasma is replaced with saline, but true agglutination will persist.

Antibodies to blood group antigens other than A and B may react with the reagent cells used in reverse grouping. If a cold-reacting autoantibody is present, the false positive result can be resolved by warming the sample to 37 °C (99 °F). If the result is caused by an alloantibody, an antibody screen can be performed to identify the antibody, and the reverse grouping can be performed using samples that lack the relevant antigen.

=== Weak D phenotype ===
Approximately 0.2 to 1% of people have a "weak D" phenotype, meaning that they are positive for the RhD antigen, but exhibit weak or negative reactions with some anti-RhD reagents due to decreased antigen expression or atypical variants of antigen structure. If routine serologic testing for RhD results in a score of 2+ or less, the antiglobulin test can be used to demonstrate the presence of RhD. Weak D testing is also performed on blood donors who initially type as RhD negative. Historically, blood donors with weak D were treated as Rh positive and patients with weak D were treated as Rh negative in order to avoid potential exposure to incompatible blood. Genotyping is increasingly used to determine the molecular basis of weak D phenotypes, as this determines whether or not individuals with weak D can produce antibodies against RhD or sensitize others to the RhD antigen.

=== Red cell antibody sensitization ===
The indirect antiglobulin test, which is used for weak D testing and typing of some red blood cell antigens, detects IgG bound to red blood cells. If IgG is bound to red blood cells in vivo, as may occur in autoimmune hemolytic anemia, hemolytic disease of the newborn and transfusion reactions, the indirect antiglobulin test will always give a positive result, regardless of the presence of the relevant antigen. A direct antiglobulin test can be performed to demonstrate that the positive reaction is due to sensitization of red cells.

== Other pretransfusion testing ==
Some groups of people have specialized transfusion requirements. Fetuses, very low-birth-weight infants, and immunocompromised people are at risk for developing severe infection with cytomegalovirus (CMV)―an opportunistic pathogen for which approximately 50% of blood donors test positive―and may be transfused with CMV-negative blood to prevent infection. Those who are at risk of developing graft-versus-host disease, such as bone marrow transplant recipients, receive blood that has been irradiated to inactivate the T lymphocytes that are responsible for this reaction. People who have had serious allergic reactions to blood transfusions in the past may be transfused with blood that has been "washed" to remove plasma. The history of the patient is also examined to see if they have previously identified antibodies and any other serological anomalies.

A direct antiglobulin test (Coombs test) is also performed as part of the antibody investigation.

Donor blood is generally screened for transfusion-transmitted infections such as HIV. As of 2018, the World Health Organization reported that nearly 100% of blood donations in high- and upper-middle-income countries underwent infectious disease screening, but the figures for lower-middle-income and low-income countries were 82% and 80.3% respectively.

== History ==
In 1901, Karl Landsteiner published the results of an experiment in which he mixed the serum and red blood cells of five different human donors. He observed that a person's serum never agglutinated their own red blood cells, but it could agglutinate others', and based on the agglutination reactions the red cells could be sorted into three groups: group A, group B, and group C. Group C, which consisted of red blood cells that did not react with any person's plasma, would later be known as group O. A fourth group, now known as AB, was described by Landsteiner's colleagues in 1902. This experiment was the first example of blood typing.

In 1945, Robin Coombs, A.E. Mourant and R.R. Race published a description of the antiglobulin test (also known as the Coombs test). Previous research on blood group antibodies had documented the presence of so-called "blocking" or "incomplete" antibodies: antibodies that occupied antigen sites, preventing other antibodies from binding, but did not cause red blood cells to agglutinate. Coombs and his colleagues devised a method to easily demonstrate the presence of these antibodies. They injected human immunoglobulins into rabbits, which caused them to produce an anti-human globulin antibody. The anti-human globulin could bind to antibodies already attached to red blood cells and cause them to agglutinate. The invention of the antiglobulin test led to the discovery of many more blood group antigens. By the early 1950s, companies had begun producing commercial antisera for special antigen testing.
