= Kastle =

== People ==
- Darwin Kastle (born 1971) Magic: The Gathering player
- Leonard Kastle (1929–2011) opera composer
- Richard Kastle (born 1958) pianist

== Other ==
- Washington Kastles, professional tennis team in Washington, D.C.
- Kastle-Meyer test
- Kastle Systems, an American security firm
