= Medical examiner =

Officer who investigates a cause of death

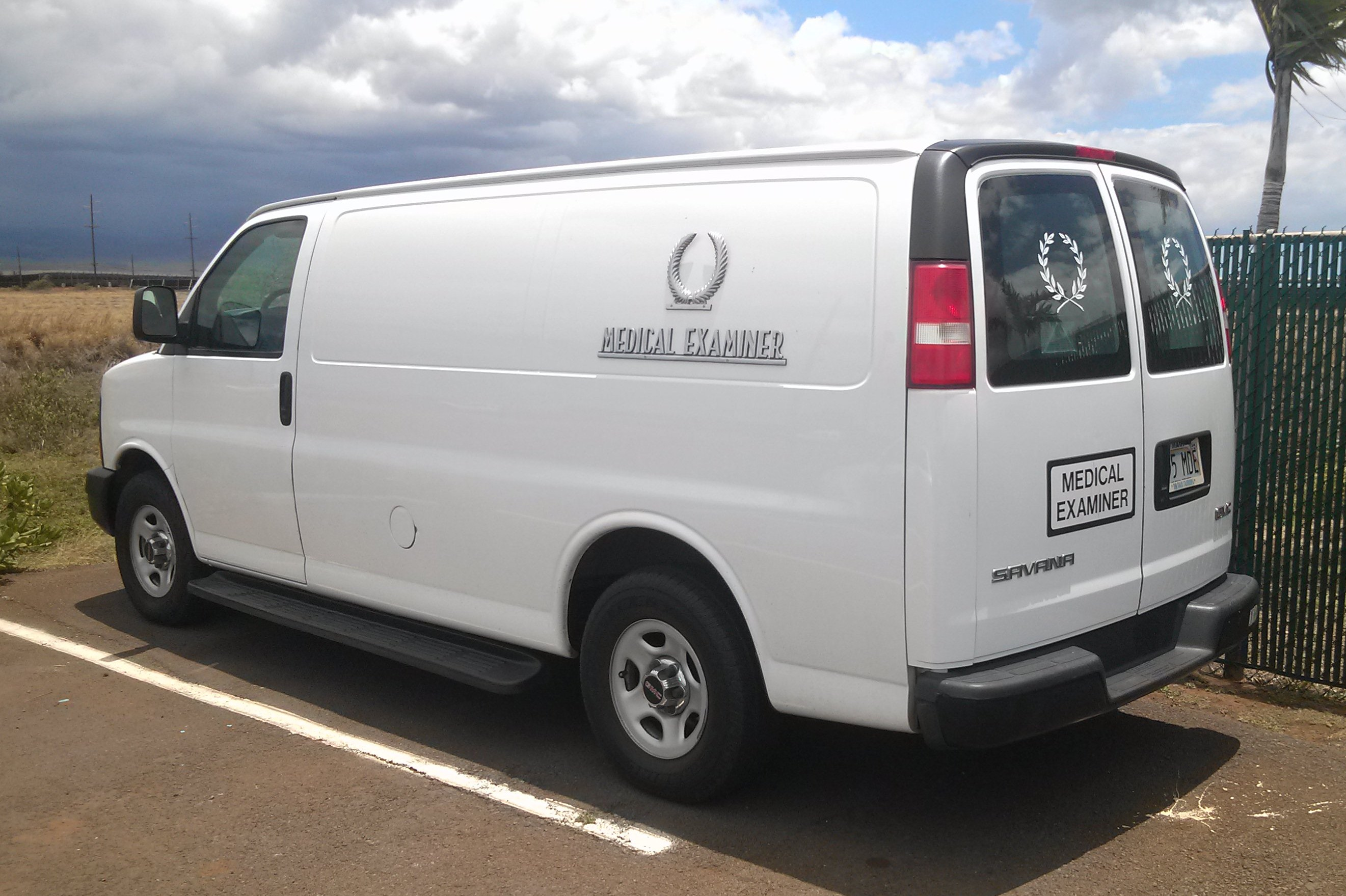
Hawaiian medical examiner van

The medical examiner is an official who is responsible for investigating the cause of a death and overseeing the death certification process. A medical examiner is usually trained in pathology. In the United States they may perform post-mortem examinations, and in some jurisdictions have the power to initiate inquests. In England and Wales, the medical examiner is mostly responsible for scrutinising the cause of a death where an inquest is not held by a coroner.

In England and Wales (and formerly in Scotland) coroners are judicial officers who have held a number of responsibilities since their inception, but today they are mostly responsible for holding inquests where the cause of a death may not be clear or suspicious. This system was adopted throughout the British Empire, including in the United States. In most of these countries, including parts of the United States, the coroner has retained this role, however parts of the United States may also have a medical examiner, which evolved from coroners during the latter half of the 19th century. The exact responsibilities of a medical examiner varies across jurisdictions, with over 2,000 separate jurisdictions for investigating unnatural deaths.

== History ==
=== United Kingdom ===
Medical examiners in England and Wales have been used to investigate deaths that are not investigated by a coroner since September 2024, and a national medical examiner has been appointed since December 2025.

=== United States ===
In the United States, as the coroner is not necessarily a medical doctor, they may be a lawyer or a layperson. In the 19th century, the public became dissatisfied with lay coroners and demanded that the coroner be replaced by a physician. In 1918, New York City introduced the office of the Chief Medical Examiner and appointed physicians experienced in the field of pathology. In 1959, the medical subspecialty of forensic pathology was formally certified.

== United States ==
In 2002, 22 states had a medical examiner system, 11 states had a coroner system, and 18 states had a mixed system. Since the 1940s, the medical examiner system has gradually replaced the coroner system and serves about 48% of the US population. The requirements to hold office vary widely between jurisdictions. The largest medical examiner's office in the United States is located in Baltimore, Maryland.

The types of death reportable to medical examiners are determined by federal, state, or local laws. Commonly, these include violent, suspicious, sudden, and unexpected deaths, death when no physician or practitioner was present or treating the decedent, inmates in public institutions, those in custody of law enforcement, deaths during or immediately following therapeutic or diagnostic procedures or deaths due to neglect.

A medical examiner's duties vary by location, but typically include:

- investigating human organs like the stomach, liver, and brain
- determining cause of death and manner of death
- examining the condition of the body
- studying tissue, organs, cells, and bodily fluids
- issuing death certificates
- maintaining death records
- responding to deaths in mass disasters
- working closely with law enforcement
- identifying unknown dead
- performing other functions depending on local law.

In some jurisdictions, a coroner performs these and other duties. It is common for a medical examiner to visit crime scenes or to testify in court. Medical examiners specialize in forensic knowledge and rely on this during their work. In addition to studying cadavers, they are also trained in toxicology, DNA technology and forensic serology (blood analysis). Pulling from each area of knowledge, a medical examiner is an expert in determining a cause of death. This information can help law enforcement solve cases and is crucial to their ability to track criminals in the event of a homicide or other related events.

== Qualifications ==
=== United Kingdom ===
In England and Wales, a new statutory Medical Examiner system based in NHS Acute Trusts commenced in 2019, coming into operation on the 9th of September 2024. A medical examiner is always a medical doctor, whereas a coroner is a judicial officer.

Pilot studies in Sheffield and seven other areas, which involved medical examiners looking at more than 27,000 deaths since 2008, found 25% of hospital death certificates were inaccurate and 20% of causes of death were wrong. Suzy Lishman, president of the Royal College of Pathologists, said it was crucial there was "independent scrutiny of causes of death".

=== United States ===
Qualifications for medical examiners in the US vary from jurisdiction to jurisdiction. In Wisconsin, for example, some counties do not require individuals to have any special educational or medical training to hold this office. In most jurisdictions, a medical examiner is required to have a medical degree, although in many there is no requirement for specialized training in pathology. Other jurisdictions have stricter requirements, including additional education in pathology, law, and forensic pathology. Medical examiners are typically appointed officers.

== Education ==
In the United States, medical examiners require extensive training in order to become experts in their field. After high school, the additional schooling may take 11–18 years. They must attend a college or university to earn a bachelor's degree sufficient for admission to medical school. Biology is usually the most common. A medical degree (MD or DO) is often required to become a medical examiner. To enter medical school, the MCAT (Medical College Admissions Test) is usually required after which medical school is another four years with the first two dedicated to academics and the rest of the two used to gain clinical experience.

To become experts in pathology, specifically, additional training is required after medical school. The first step is to complete pathological forensic training. This usually consists of anatomic and clinical pathology training which takes anywhere from four to five years to complete. After this, the physician may complete an anatomic pathology residency or a fellowship. Before practicing as a medical examiner, the physician must also become board certified through the American Board of Pathology.

== Career ==
The general job outlook for medical examiners in the United States is considered to be excellent. Remuneration varies by location, but it is estimated to average between $105,000 and $500,000.

== Shortage ==
In the United States, there are fewer than 500 board-certified forensic pathologists, but the National Commission on Forensic Science estimates the country needs 1,100–1,200 to perform the needed number of autopsies. The shortage is attributed to the nature of the work and the higher pay in other medical specialties. It has caused long delays in some states and resulted in fewer investigations and less thorough investigations in some cases.

== See also ==
- Coroner
- List of fictional medical examiners
