= Rapid Stain Identification Series =

Rapid Stain Identification Series (RSID) is designed for fast, easy and reliable detection of human fluids from a variety of samples encountered by forensic laboratories.

It has been developed in the United States for the Federal Bureau of Investigation.

This group of tests relies on antibody conjugation reactions to form colored complexes in the presence of specific biological fluids. Most tests are also designed so that only specific human fluids will end in a positive result. To perform a test, the sample in question is mixed with a buffer specific to the RSID test. The sample is then deposited onto the sample window where it is pulled through the test and control regions by a paper wick via passive diffusion. The RSID unit is impregnated with fluid-specific antibodies conjugated to colored complexes that will re-dissolve and diffuse at this time. If the fluid in question is present in the questioned sample, antibodies at the test line will react to the colored antibody complexes and form a colored line. If no fluid is present, or if the sample is not human, this line will not appear. A line will form at the control region regardless of if the sample contains body fluid or not, as it acts as an internal control.

Positive and negative controls are also performed alongside each test to confirm its reliability and functionality. Positive controls are swabs taken from known bodily fluids while negative controls are buffer without any biological sample.

== Uses ==
It is used for the fast testing of:

- Saliva – Human salivary α-amylase-specific antibodies are conjugated with colloidal gold and incorporated beneath the sample window. An anti-α-amylase antibody is fixed at the test line. If human salivary amylase is present in the sample, it will form an antigen-antibody-colloidal gold complex upon deposition. These complexes react with the antibodies fixed at the test line to form a visible red line indicating the presence of human salivary α-amylase, and therefore, human saliva.
- Blood – Human glycophorin A-specific antibodies are conjugated with colloidal gold and incorporated beneath the sample window. An anti-glycophorin A antibody is fixed at the test line. If human glycophorin A is present in the sample, it will form an antigen-antibody-colloidal gold complex upon deposition. These complexes react with the antibodies fixed at the test line to form a visible red line indicating the presence of human glycophorin A, and therefore, human blood.
- Urine – Tamm-Horsfall (THP)-specific antibodies are conjugated with blue latex beads and incorporated beneath the sample window. Another THP-specific antibody is fixed at the test line. If THP is present in the sample, it will form an antigen-antibody-colloidal gold complex upon deposition. These complexes react with the antibodies fixed at the test line to form a visible blue line indicating the presence of THP, and therefore, urine.
- Semen – Human semenogelin-specific antibodies are conjugated with colloidal gold and incorporated beneath the sample window. An anti-semenogelin antibody is fixed at the test line. If human semenogelin is present in the sample, it will form an antigen-antibody-colloidal gold complex upon deposition. These complexes react with the antibodies fixed at the test line to form a visible red line indicating the presence of human semenogelin, and therefore, human semen.

== See also ==
- Forensic serology
- Luminol
