= Forensic serology =

Study of body fluids in a crime scene

Forensic serology is the detection, identification, classification, and study of various bodily fluids such as blood, semen, saliva, and urine, and their relationship to a crime scene. A forensic serologist may also be involved in DNA analysis and bloodstain pattern analysis. Serology testing begins with presumptive tests which gives the analyst an indication that a specific bodily fluid may be present, but cannot completely confirm its presence. Following the presumptive tests, confirmatory tests are done on the same sample to confirm what the unknown substance actually is.

== Blood detection ==
Blood is composed of liquid plasma and serum with solid components consisting of red blood cells (erythrocytes), white blood cells (leukocytes), and platelets (thrombocytes). To detect blood at a crime scene or in the laboratory, an array of tests can be used. The most publicized test by crime shows is the Luminol process in which a chemical is sprayed onto a surface where blood is suspected to be. The chemical reacts with traces of blood, producing a chemi-luminescence, or apparent glow, as a result of the chemical reaction that occurs. As with all presumptive tests, this technique can produce false positive results due to metals and strong chemicals, such as bleach, that will also react. Another common presumptive test is the Kastle-Meyer or Phenolphthalein test. This is a catalytic test that detects the heme group in blood that transports oxygen and carbon dioxide. A sterile cotton swab is soaked in distilled water and applied to the area of suspected blood to pick up some of the sample. One drop of alcohol is applied to the swab, followed by the addition of one drop of the phenolphthalein reagent, followed by one drop of hydrogen peroxide. A positive result induces a color change to pink. Similar to the Kastle-Meyer test, a hemastix is also a catalytic test simplified to a specialized strip where the blood sample is extracted by a wet swab and placed directly on the hemastix. A positive result induces a colour change from yellow to dark green.

For confirmatory tests, the Takayama Crystal Assay or an immunochromatographic test are typically used. The Takayama Crystal Assay, which forms a ferro protoporphyrin ring by a reaction between pyridine and the iron atom of the heme group. The Takayama reagent is added to a slide with a presumptive blood sample. The slide is dried at 115 degrees Celsius following the addition of the Takayama reagent. Then it is placed under a microscope and a positive result is the visualization of dark red, feathery crystals. For the immunochromatographic test, it functions similar to a pregnancy test where antigens present in blood are detected and a positive result is a band at the test site and control site. After performing the various tests an analyst can confirm the presence of human blood and continue to develop a DNA profile with downstream applications such as DNA extraction, Polymerase Chain Reaction (PCR), Capillary Electrophoresis (CE), etc., followed by profile interpretation.

== Semen detection ==
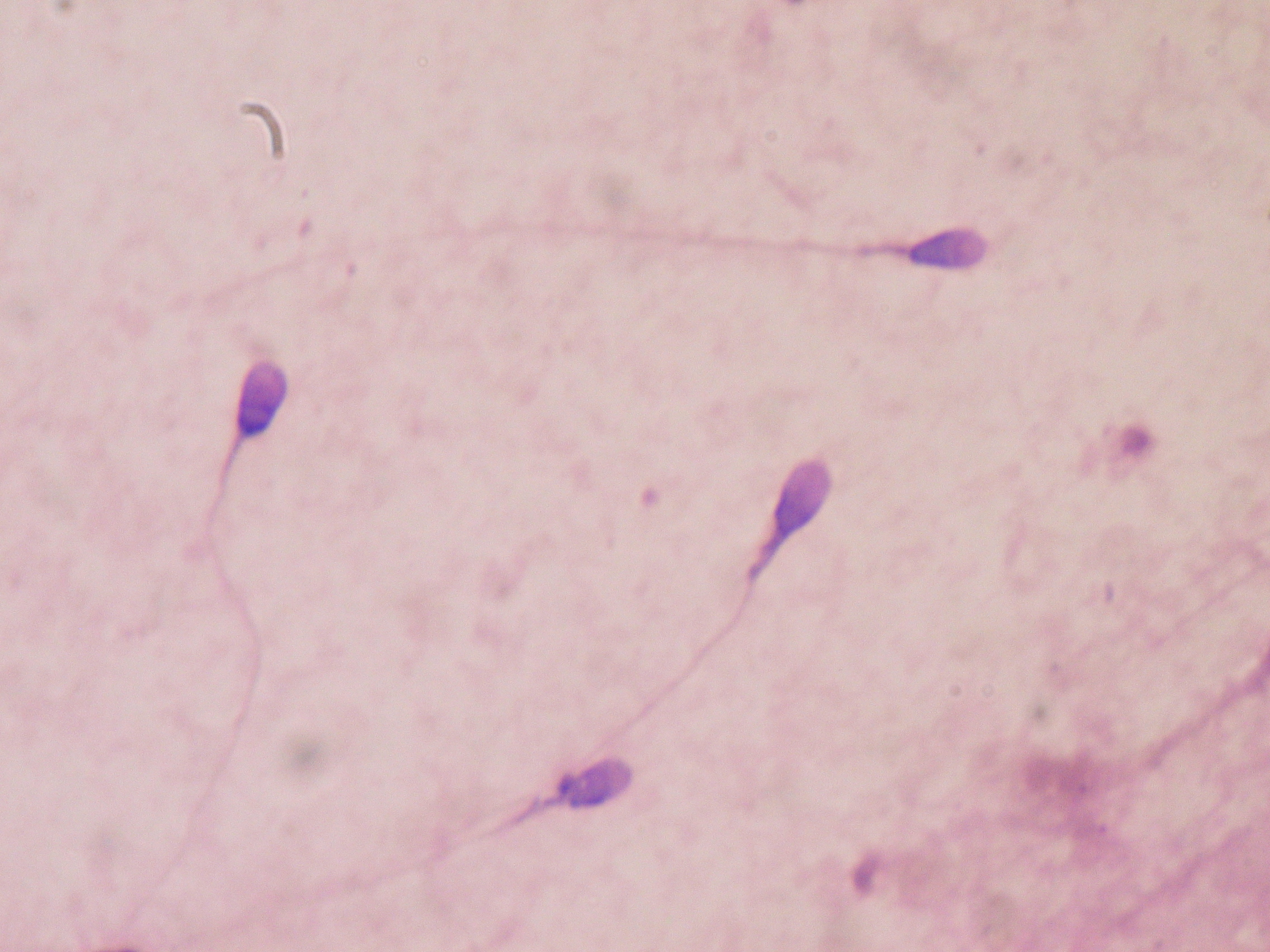
Stained sperm under microscope

Semen is a white fluid that is ejaculated from a male's penis due to sexual arousal. In order to initially detect semen, an alternative light source (ALS) is used. Under UV light, semen fluoresces making it visible to investigators to collect samples from a crime scene. A common presumptive test for detecting semen is called the acid phosphatase (AP) test. The AP test detects the enzyme acid phosphatase that is secreted from the prostate gland. However, this test is only presumptive because acid phosphatase is found in other bodily fluids. To perform the test, a drop of the reagent sodium alpha-napthyphosphate is added to the presumptive stain followed by a drop of fast blue B. A positive result of this test is a color change to dark purple.

Confirmatory tests for semen include the christmas tree stain and the p30/PSA RSID kit. For the christmas tree stain, the sample is extracted with sterile water in order to make a wet mount on a microscope slide. The sample is then heat-fixed to the slide and stained with nuclear fast red for 15 minutes, then rinsed with deionized water. Next, a green stain is applied for 10 seconds, then rinsed with ethanol. The slide is placed under a compound light microscope for sperm observation. If sperm are present, the heads will stain red and the mid-piece and tail stain green. However, not all males release sperm in their semen. If a male is aspermic or oligospermic, they either have no sperm or a low sperm count. Vasectomized males will not release sperm either. When sperm cells are not present, a second confirmatory test, the p30/PSA test, is performed.

PSA(p30) is known as a prostate-specific antigen that is produced by the prostatic gland in males. The p30/PSA test is an immunochromatographic test that detects the presence of the antigen p30 in semen samples. This test functions similar to a pregnancy test, where if the antigen p30 is present a band will appear at the test site and a control band will appear to confirm if the test is working properly. If the confirmatory test is positive, then semen is present in the sample. From there an analyst could continue to develop a DNA profile with downstream applications.

== Saliva detection ==
A presumptive test to detect saliva is the alpha-amylase test also known as the Phadebas Test. This detection technique is based on the activity of the enzyme alpha-amylase which breaks down starches from food into smaller oligosaccharide molecules, starting digestion in the mouth. Using a petri dish gel, the saliva sample is added and allowed to diffuse through the gel overnight. Visualization is accomplished by adding iodine to the gel which stains the starch in the gel blue. If saliva is present, then the alpha-amylase breaks down the starch, creating a clear coloured circle around where the sample was placed. RSID tests have also been made in order to detect alpha-amylase, but they are not always reliable because there can be a lot of false positives.

For confirmatory tests, there has not been as much research done compared to blood and semen. Since these tests specifically target amylase, confirmatory tests can not be done considering amylase can be found in other bodily fluids.

== Urine Detection ==
The presumptive detection of urine can be done by alternative light sources or a p-Dimethylaminocinnamaldehyde test (DMAC). The DMAC will react with urea, uric acid or ammonia which can all be found in urine. When a sample with potential urine is found, 0.1% DMAC can be applied. If there is a positive reaction, a pink/magenta colour will be present on the stain. There are only presumptive tests for urine detection because the tests used target material that can be found in other bodily fluids. This can cause a lot of false positives and inaccurate results.

== Research ==
=== MicroRNA ===
Testing for different body fluids with traditional serological techniques, such as those listed above, is possible, but not without some drawbacks. Firstly, not all body fluids have a reliable confirmatory test, and those that do typically require a larger amount of the suspected stain in order to perform the confirmatory test. This can be limiting if the forensic sample being tested is small to begin with. Also, serology is often done before any downstream analyses like DNA, so if sample is limited in size to begin with performing serological analyses and obtaining a DNA profile successfully may not be possible. Currently, researchers are looking into ways to identify bodily fluids with more success and less sample needed, and an emerging way to do this is with micro RNAs.

Micro RNAs (miRNA) are small, noncoding, single-stranded RNA that are used to regulate gene expression by either regulating translation (protein synthesis) or marking messenger RNA (mRNA) for degradation. Given their regulatory role, the theory is that different miRNAs would be present in different amounts in certain fluid or tissue types because each of those tissue types should have unique proteins and mRNA based on their role in the body. MiRNAs are also an ideal target for forensic analysis because they are small compared to other cellular components, so they tend to resist degradation better than other tissue markers, which is important considering that case work samples are not always going to be in pristine condition. Finally, miRNAs have the potential to be co-extracted and analyzed at the same time as DNA, combining the two processes into one for biological sample analysis, saving time and sample.

miRNA can be extracted using a number of commercially available kits, such as the Solid Phase QIAmp DNA mini kit. Ideally, like the QIAmp kit, the extraction method used is able to extract DNA and miRNA simultaneously, minimizing the amount of reactions and the amount of sample used. miRNAs can be quantified using quantitative Real Time PCR, similar to traditional DNA samples. However, primers and probes would have to be designed for the miRNA targets in order to do so. Unlike routine DNA profiling, miRNA amplification requires an extra step before the PCR process. miRNA requires a reverse transcription step to convert the miRNA fragments into their complementary DNA (cDNA) fragments. Once this conversion has happened, the cDNA and the other DNA in the sample can be amplified using PCR and then separated/visualized using a capillary electrophoresis protocol. cDNA specific primers would have to be designed for your miRNA targets. The final output is an electropherogram that contains not only the STR profile of the sample, but also a peak representing which miRNA is present in that sample.

Current potential miRNA biomarkers: Research is still needed in order to narrow down potential biomarkers, as some tissues and fluids have the same miRNA expressed in different concentrations. To date, blood and semen miRNAs have been the most studied and have found promising candidate biomarkers.

Bodily Fluid	Potential Biomarkers for ID
Blood	miR451, miR16
Semen	miR135b, miR10b
Saliva	miR658, miR205
Vaginal Secretions	miR124a miR372
Menstrual Blood	miR412 with miR451

=== Loop-mediated isothermal amplification ===
Like the technique of extracting miRNA, researchers have been able to test one or more samples by extracting DNA and testing it in an instrument that most labs have readily available. This method has proven to produce more DNA than PCR based amplification. Researchers have also added other factors to the loop-mediated isothermal amplification make identification of different body fluids. Using LAMP has reduced the time needed to get results, which is what the ultimate goal was. Although it has proven to decrease total and hands-on time needed to get a result, there are still kinks to work out before this method is used in many or all forensic labs.

== See also ==
- RSID
- Karl Landsteiner
- Paul Uhlenhuth
- microRNA
- Loop-mediated isothermal amplification
