= Cross-matching =

Testing before a blood transfusion

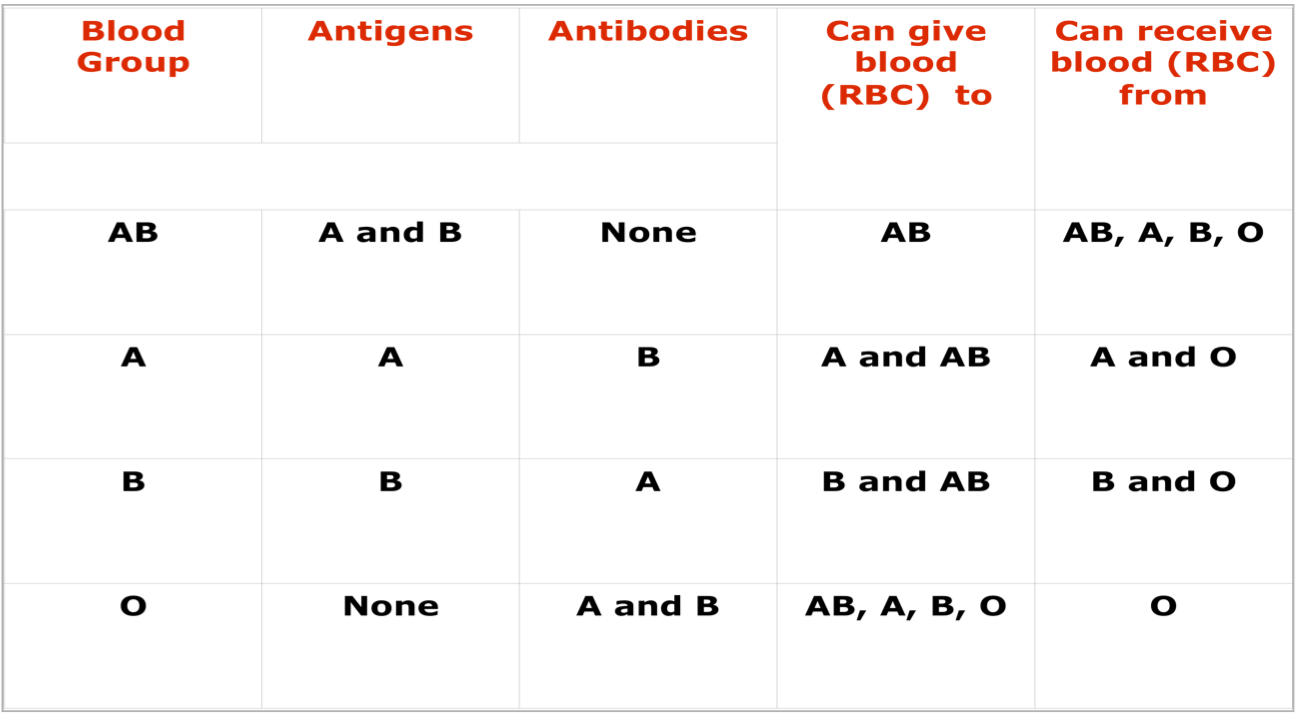
- Compatibility testing concerning RBCs
- MeSH: D001788

Cross-matching or crossmatching is a test performed before a blood transfusion as part of blood compatibility testing. Normally, this involves adding the recipient's blood plasma to a sample of the donor's red blood cells. If the blood is incompatible, the antibodies in the recipient's plasma will bind to antigens on the donor red blood cells. This antibody-antigen reaction can be detected through visible clumping or destruction of the red blood cells, or by reaction with anti-human globulin. Along with blood typing of the donor and recipient and screening for unexpected blood group antibodies, cross-matching is one of a series of steps in pre-transfusion testing. In some circumstances, an electronic cross-match can be performed by comparing records of the recipient's ABO and Rh blood type against that of the donor sample. In emergencies, blood may be issued before cross-matching is complete. Cross-matching is also used to determine compatibility between a donor and recipient in solid organ transplantation including heart/lung transplation.

== Types ==
=== Immediate-spin cross-matching ===
Immediate-spin cross-matching (ISCM) is an abbreviated form of cross-matching that is faster, but less sensitive; its primary use is to detect a mismatch between ABO blood types. It is an immediate test that involves combining the patient's serum and donor's red blood cells at room temperature, then centrifuging the sample and observing for agglutination or hemolysis. A lack of agglutination or hemolysis indicates a negative test reaction, or compatible match. ISCM is not appropriate in all circumstances; if the recipient's antibody screen is positive, or if they have had a positive antibody screen in the past, a full crossmatch is performed instead.

=== Anti-human globulin cross-matching ===
The AHG crossmatch is done by incubating the recipient serum/plasma with the donor's red blood cells and adding anti-human globulin. It is essentially an indirect Coomb's test. It is also called "full cross-matching", "IAT cross-matching" and "Coomb's cross-matching".

=== Electronic cross-matching ===
Electronic cross-matching is a computer-assisted analysis using data, from the donor unit (where a donor's blood is tested prior to donation) and testing done on blood samples from the intended recipient. This includes ABO/Rh typing of the unit and of the recipient, and an antibody screen of the recipient. Electronic cross-matching can only be used if a patient has a negative antibody screen, which means that they do not have any active red blood cell atypical antibodies, or they are below the detectable level of current testing methods. If all of the data entered is compatible, the computer will print a compatibility label stating that the unit is safe to transfuse.

=== Major versus minor ===
- Major cross-match: Here the Recipient serum is tested against donor packed cells to determine if the recipient has preformed antibodies against any antigens on the donor's cells. This is the required cross-match prior to release of a unit of packed cell from blood bank.
- Minor cross-match: Here the Recipient red cells are tested against donor serum to detect donor antibodies directed against a patient's antigens. This is no longer required. It is assumed that the small amount of donor serum and antibodies left in a unit of packed cells will be diluted in a recipient.

== Emergencies ==
As the complete cross-matching process takes approximately 1 hour, it is not always used in emergencies.

In the case of an emergency, a type-specific blood to which the recipient has no antibodies, can be requested. It is thought that this lifesaving measure is of more benefit than any risk of an antibody-mediated transfusion reaction. This type of blood has less risk of a serious transfusion reaction because it is both ABO compatible and Rhesus (Rh)-compatible.

Universal donor blood, which is both type O and Rh negative, can be given if the recipient's blood group is not known, as may happen in an emergency. It is the policy of some institutions to reserve the releasing of O− blood only for female patients of childbearing age. This serves two purposes. First, it preserves the lower stock of O− blood and secondly, this eliminates the risk of O− negative mothers forming anti-D (Rh) antibodies from exposure to O+ blood. Anti-D (Rh) can cross the placenta during pregnancy and attack an unborn child's RBCs if they are D (Rh) positive causing haemolytic disease of the newborn.

In an emergency, blood grouping can be done easily and quickly in 2 or 3 minutes in the laboratory on glass slides with appropriate reagents, by trained technical staff. This method depends on the presence or absence of agglutination (clumping of red blood cells), which can usually be visualized directly. Presence of agglutination indicates incompatibility. Occasionally a light microscope may be needed. If laboratory services are not available, the bedside card method of blood grouping may be used, where a drop of the intended recipients blood is added to dried reagents on a prepared card. This method may not be as reliable as laboratory methods, which are preferable.

== See also ==
- Blood compatibility testing
