= Mixed-field agglutination =

In transfusion medicine, mixed-field agglutination refers to mixed reactions during cell typing where two distinct cell populations are present: agglutinated cells admixed with many unagglutinated cells. The presence of two or more cell populations is known as chimerism. Mixed-field agglutination is an important cause of ABO typing and genotype discrepancies. The cause of mixed field agglutinations should be sought prior to setting up blood for transfusion.

== Causes ==
=== False chimerism ===
By far the most common cause of mixed-field agglutination is false chimerism. There are several causes of false chimerism;

1) Transfusion of donor red cells. For example, a blood group B individual who has received a transfusion of group O donor red cells may show mixed field agglutination with anti-B sera. His own group B red cells are agglutinated by the anti-B sera while the group O donor red cells in his circulation are unagglutinated

2) After an ABO mismatched stem cell transplant for example a blood group O stem cell donor and a blood group A stem cell recipient.

3) Weak expression of the A or B blood group antigen

4) In some diseases, for example leukaemia

=== True chimerism ===
A true chimerism is a rare sporadic phenomenon whereby an individual has a dual cell population derived from more than one zygote. This may result from intrauterine exchange of erythrocyte precursors between twins (twin chimerism) or two fertilized eggs fuse into one individual. Twin chimerism results from mixing of blood between two twin fetuses through placental blood vessel anastomoses, leading to engraftment of hematopoietic stem cells from one twin within the marrow of the other. Each twin ends up with two distinct cell populations of varying proportions.
