= Agglutination (biology) =

Type of antibody response

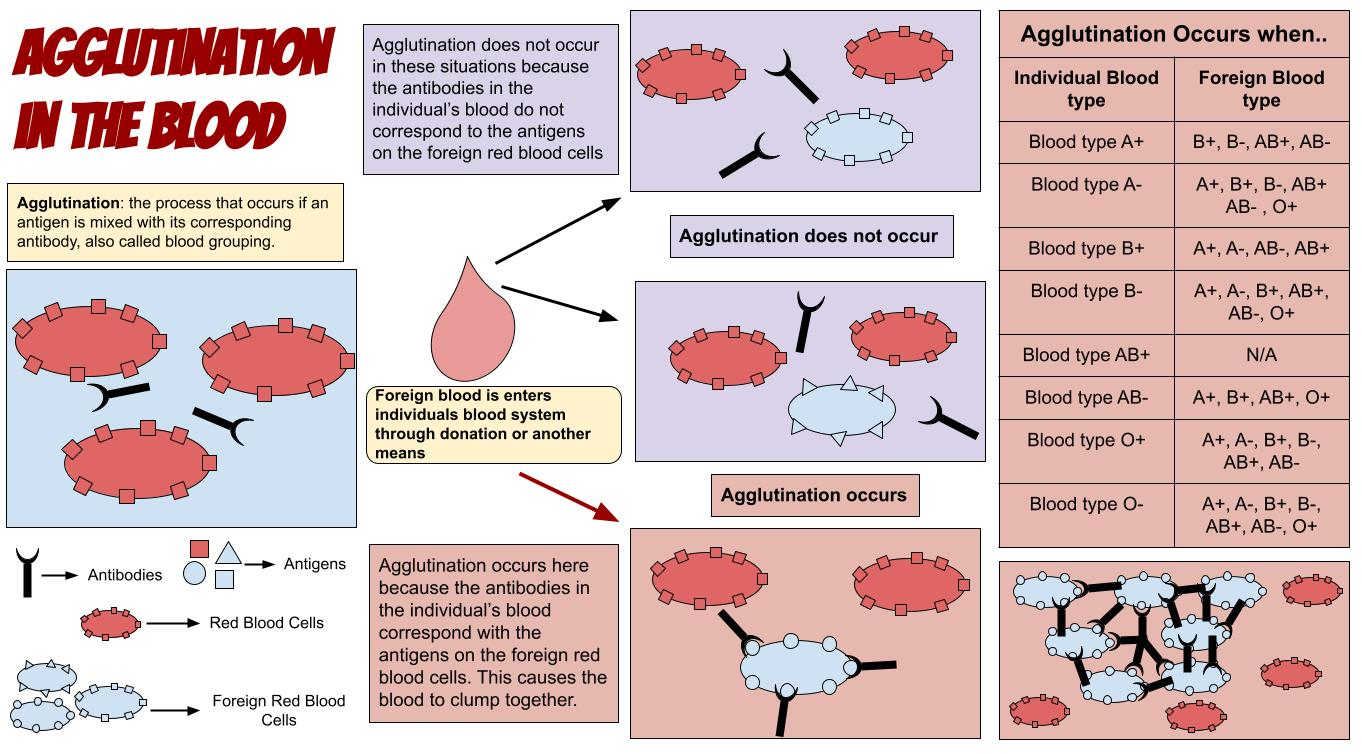
This image explains agglutination in the blood

Agglutination is the clumping of particles. The word agglutination comes from the Latin agglutinare (glueing to).

Agglutination is a reaction in which particles (as red blood cells or bacteria) suspended in a liquid collect into clumps usually as a response to a specific antibody.

Agglutination(clumping) of red blood cells.

This occurs in biology in two main examples:

1. The clumping of cells such as bacteria or red blood cells in the presence of an antibody or complement. The antibody or other molecule binds multiple particles and joins them, creating a large complex. This increases the efficacy of microbial elimination by phagocytosis as large clumps of bacteria can be eliminated in one pass, versus the elimination of single microbial antigens.
2. When people are given blood transfusions of the wrong blood group, the antibodies react with the incorrectly transfused blood group and as a result, the erythrocytes clump up and stick together causing them to agglutinate. The coalescing of small particles that are suspended in a solution; these larger masses are then (usually) precipitated.

== In immunohematology ==
=== Hemagglutination ===
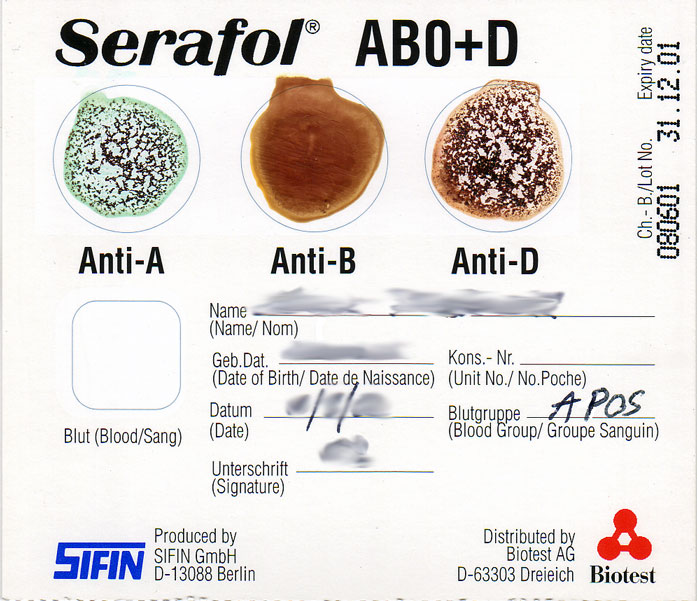
The 'bedside card' method of blood typing, in this case using a Serafol card. The result is blood group A positive.

Hemagglutination is the process by which red blood cells agglutinate, meaning clump or clog. The agglutin involved in hemagglutination is called hemagglutinin. In cross-matching, donor red blood cells and the recipient's serum or plasma are incubated together. If agglutination occurs, this indicates that the donor and recipient blood types are incompatible.

When a person produces antibodies against their own red blood cells, as in cold agglutinin disease and other autoimmune conditions, the cells may agglutinate spontaneously. This is called autoagglutination and it can interfere with laboratory tests such as blood typing and the complete blood count.

=== Leukoagglutination ===
Leukoagglutination occurs when the particles involved are white blood cells.

An example is the PH-L form of phytohaemagglutinin.

== In microbiology ==
Agglutination is commonly used as a method of identifying specific bacterial antigens and the identity of such bacteria, and therefore is an important technique in diagnosis.

== History of discoveries ==
Two bacteriologists, Herbert Edward Durham (1866-1945) and Max von Gruber (1853–1927), discovered specific agglutination in 1896. The clumping became known as Gruber-Durham reaction. Gruber introduced the term agglutinin (from the Latin) for any substance that caused agglutination of cells.

French physician Fernand Widal (1862–1929) put Gruber and Durham's discovery to practical use later in 1896, using the reaction as the basis for a test for typhoid fever. Widal found that blood serum from a typhoid carrier caused a culture of typhoid bacteria to clump, whereas serum from a typhoid-free person did not. This Widal test was the first example of serum diagnosis.

Austrian physician Karl Landsteiner found another important practical application of the agglutination reaction in 1900. Landsteiner's agglutination tests and his discovery of ABO blood groups was the start of the science of blood transfusion and serology which has made transfusion possible and safer.

== See also ==
- Agglutination-PCR
- Blocking antibody
- Coagulation
- Immune system
- Macrophage
- Mannan oligosaccharides (MOS)
