= Presumptive and confirmatory tests =

Presumptive tests, in medical and forensic science, analyze a sample and establish one of the following:

1. The sample is definitely not a certain substance.
2. The sample probably is the substance.

For example, the Kastle–Meyer test will show either that a sample is not blood or that the sample is probably blood, but may be a less common substance. Further chemical tests are needed to prove that the substance is blood.

Confirmatory tests are the tests required to confirm the analysis. Confirmatory tests cost more than simpler presumptive tests so presumptive tests are often done to see if confirmatory tests are necessary.

Similarly, in medicine, a presumptive diagnosis identifies the likely condition of a patient, and a confirmatory diagnosis is needed to confirm the condition.

== Examples ==
- Acid phosphatase test for semen
- Cobalt thiocyanate test for cocaine
- Duquenois-Levine reagent for cannabis
- Kastle-Meyer test for blood
- Malachite green test for blood
- Marquis reagent for narcotics and alkaloids
- Benzidine test for blood which changes from clear to blue in color with the presence of blood
- Luminol, phenolphthalein, Hemastix, Hemident, and Bluestar are all also used for blood testing

== FDA recommendations ==
The US Food and Drug Administration issued a Premarket Submission and Labeling Recommendations for Drugs of Abuse Screening Tests. Its availability was announced in the Federal Register, Vol. 68, No. 231 on December 2, 2003, and is listed under "Notices." Presumptive testing has found widespread use by employers and public entities. Most people who take a drug test take a presumptive test, cheaper and faster than other methods of testing. However, it is less accurate and can render false results. The FDA recommends for confirmatory testing to be conducted and the placing of a warning label on the presumptive drug test: "This assay provides only a preliminary result. Clinical consideration and professional judgment should be applied to any drug of abuse test result, in evaluating a preliminary positive result. To obtain a confirmed analytical result, a more specific alternate chemical method is needed. Gas chromatography/mass spectrometry (GC/MS) is the recommended confirmatory method."
