= Kastle–Meyer test =

Blood test utilizing phenolphthalein

The Kastle–Meyer test is a presumptive blood test, first described in 1903, in which the chemical indicator phenolphthalein is used to detect the possible presence of hemoglobin. It relies on the peroxidase-like activity of hemoglobin in blood to catalyze the oxidation of phenolphthalin (the colorless reduced form of phenolphthalein) into phenolphthalein, which is visible as a bright pink color. The Kastle–Meyer test is a form of catalytic blood test, one of the two main classes of forensic tests commonly employed by crime labs in the chemical identification of blood. The other class of tests used for this purpose are microcrystal tests, such as the Teichmann crystal test and the Takayama crystal test.

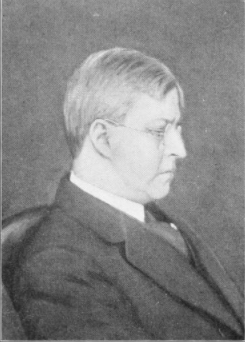
Joseph Hoeing Kastle

The test was named after the American agricultural chemist, Joseph Hoeing Kastle (1864–1916), who in 1901, invented and tested the crude blood test, and the German physician and chemist, Erich Meyer (1874–1927), who modified the test in 1903.

== History ==
In 1901, Joseph Hoeing Kastle and Oliver March Shedd in the U.S. found that biological material could cause the oxidation of phenolphthalin to phenolphthalein in slightly alkaline solutions. In 1903, Erich Meyer in Germany found that blood cells could also trigger the reaction. In 1906, Kastle and Amoss found that chick hemoglobin in blood triggered the reaction. In 1909, Kastle found that the test was sensitive to very dilute samples of blood. However, in 1908, Pozzi-Escot (who by then was living in Lima, Peru) found that the test produced false positive reactions in response to a number of substances besides blood.

== Method ==
A presumed blood sample is first collected with a swab. A drop of phenolphthalein reagent is added to the sample, and after a few seconds, a drop of hydrogen peroxide is applied to the swab. If the swab turns pink rapidly, it is said to test presumptive positive for blood. Waiting for periods over 30 seconds will result in most swabs turning pink naturally as they oxidize on their own in the air.

Optionally, the swab can first be treated with a drop of ethanol in order to lyse the cells present and gain increased sensitivity and specificity. This test is nondestructive to the sample, which can be kept and used in further tests at the lab; however, few labs would use the swab used for the Kastle–Meyer test in any further testing, opting instead to use a fresh swab of the original stain.

== Limitations ==
While the Kastle–Meyer test has been reported as being able to detect blood dilutions down to 1:10^{7}, there are a number of important limitations to the test. Chemical oxidants such as copper and nickel salts will cause the Kastle–Meyer reagent to turn pink before the addition of the hydrogen peroxide, thus it is vitally important to add the reagent first, then wait a few seconds, then add the hydrogen peroxide.

The Kastle–Meyer test has the same reaction with human blood as it does with any other hemoglobin-based blood, so a confirmatory test such as the Ouchterlony test must be performed to definitively conclude from which species the blood originated.

Color catalytic tests are very sensitive, but not specific. The positive color test alone should not be interpreted as positive proof of blood. A negative result is generally proof of the absence of detectable quantities of heme, however a false negative can be generated in the presence of a reducing agent. The test is unable to give specific evidence as to what is in the blood.

== Mechanism ==
The phenolphthalein used in this test has been modified from its conventional form, in that it has been reduced by two electrons and is pre-dissolved in alkaline solution. This is typically achieved by boiling an alkaline solution of phenolphthalein with powdered zinc, which reduces the phenolphthalein into phenolphthalin. Upon reduction, the very intense pink color of the cationic form of phenolphthalein fades to a faint yellow color. It is this form of phenolphthalein that is present in Kastle–Meyer test kits. In order to generate the intense pink color indicative of a positive test, the reduced phenolphthalein must be oxidized back to its normal, colored form.

In the relevant reaction, hydrogen peroxide reacts with the hemoglobin in the blood. Phenolphthalein does not directly participate in this process; instead, it acts as an external source of electrons. In its reaction with hydrogen peroxide, the heme center of hemoglobin behaves as a peroxidase, reducing the peroxide to water. This activity depletes hemoglobin of electrons that are, in turn, re-supplied by the phenolphthalein. Donating electrons to hemoglobin converts the phenolphthalin back into the intensely colored phenolphthalein. As long as the enzyme survives, the reaction of heme with peroxide is catalytic, making this test very sensitive to small quantities of blood present on the test swab. The hemoglobin-catalyzed reduction of peroxide that occurs is shown in the reaction below. The two electrons are supplied by phenolphthalein:

HOOH + 2 e^{−} + 2 H^{+} → 2 H_{2}O

The consumption of protons during the course of the reaction has the effect of raising the pH of the solution, but the amount of base produced is negligible compared to the amount of base already present in the reagent mixture.

== Other sources ==
- Culliford, Bryan J., The Examination and Typing of Bloodstains in the Crime Laboratory, Washington, D.C.: U.S. Government Printing Office, 1971.
- Gaensslen, Robert E., Sourcebook in Forensic Serology, Immunology, and Biochemistry, Washington, D.C.: U.S. Government Printing Office, 1983.
- Kirk, Paul L., Crime Investigation, John Wiley and Son, 1974.
- Metropolitan Police Forensic Science Laboratory, Biology Methods Manual, 1978.
- Ponce, Ana Castelló; Pascual, Fernando A. Verdú, "Critical Revision of Presumptive Tests for Bloodstains," Forensic Science Communications, vol. 1, No. 2, July 1999, pages 1–15.
- Saferstein, Richard, Forensic Science Handbook, Prentice Hall, Inc., 1982.
