= MYLIP =

Protein-coding gene in the species Homo sapiens

Identifiers
- Aliases: MYLIP, IDOL, MIR, myosin regulatory light chain interacting protein
- External IDs: OMIM: 610082; MGI: 2388271; GeneCards: MYLIP
Available structures
PDB	Ortholog search: PDBe RCSB
PDB	List of PDB id codes 2YHN, 2YHO
Enzyme activity
EC #	BRENDA	ExPASy	KEGG	MetaCyc
2.3.2.27	↗	↗	↗	↗

Gene location (Human)
Chr.	Chromosome 6 (human)
Band	6p22.3	Start	16,129,086 bp
Band	6p22.3	End	16,148,248 bp

Gene location (Mouse)
Chr.	Chromosome 13 (mouse)
Band	13|13 A5	Start	45,543,218 bp
Band	13|13 A5	End	45,565,498 bp
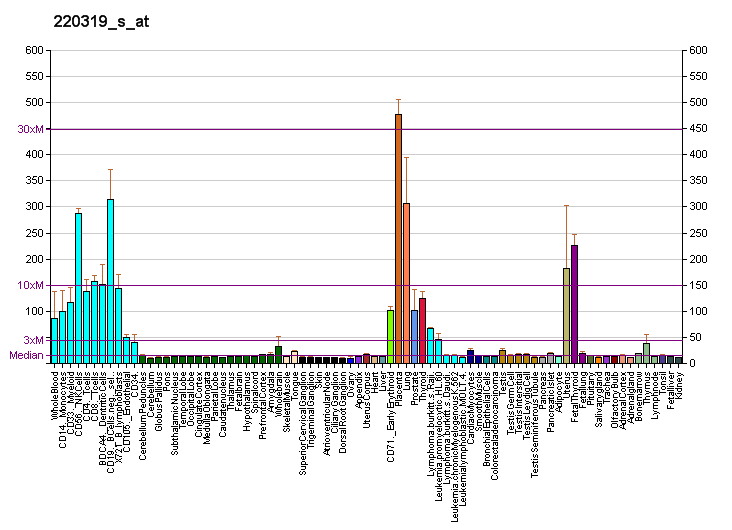
RNA expression pattern
Bgee	Human / Mouse (ortholog); Top expressed in: oocyte; secondary oocyte; nipple; lower lobe of lung; lactiferous duct; synovial joint; renal medulla; saphenous vein; urethra; cardia / Top expressed in: calvaria; lymph node; transitional epithelium of urinary bladder; ciliary body; tibiofemoral joint; parotid gland; sciatic nerve; mesenteric lymph nodes; skin of external ear; iris; More reference expression data
BioGPS	More reference expression data
Gene ontology
Molecular function	metal ion binding; cytoskeletal protein binding; protein binding; ubiquitin-protein transferase activity; structural constituent of cytoskeleton; transferase activity; ubiquitin protein ligase activity
Cellular component	cytoplasm; membrane; plasma membrane; intracellular anatomical structure; cytosol; cytoskeleton
Biological process	positive regulation of protein catabolic process; negative regulation of low-density lipoprotein particle clearance; regulation of low-density lipoprotein particle receptor catabolic process; nervous system development; protein destabilization; protein ubiquitination; cholesterol homeostasis; protein polyubiquitination; actomyosin structure organization; low-density lipoprotein particle receptor catabolic process; negative regulation of neuron projection development; ubiquitin-dependent protein catabolic process; cytoskeleton organization
Sources:Amigo / QuickGO
Orthologs
Databases	NCBI: entry; OMA: entry
Species	Human	Mouse
Entrez	29116	218203
Ensembl	ENSG00000007944	ENSMUSG00000038175
UniProt	Q8WY64	Q8BM54
RefSeq (mRNA)	NM_013262	NM_153789
RefSeq (protein)	NP_037394	NP_722484
Location (UCSC)	Chr 6: 16.13 – 16.15 Mb	Chr 13: 45.54 – 45.57 Mb
PubMed search
- Wikidata
View/Edit Human	View/Edit Mouse

Myosin regulatory light chain interacting protein, also known as MYLIP, is a protein that in humans is encoded by the MYLIP gene.

MYLIP is also known as IDOL "Inducible Degrader of the LDL receptor" based on its involvement in cholesterol regulation or MIR "Modulator Of Immune Recognition". The expression of IDOL is induced by the sterol-activated liver X receptor.

Increased Degradation of LDL Receptor Protein (IDOL) is a ubiquitin ligase that ubiquinates LDL receptors in endosomes and directs the receptors to the lysosomal compartment for degradation. IDOL is transcriptionally up-regulated by LXR/RXR in response to an increase in intracellular cholesterol. Pharmacologic inhibition of IDOL could reduce plasma LDL cholesterol by increasing plasma LDL receptor density.

== Function ==
The ERM protein family members ezrin, radixin, and moesin are cytoskeletal effector proteins linking actin to membrane-bound proteins at the cell surface. Myosin regulatory light chain interacting protein (MYLIP) is a novel ERM-like protein that interacts with myosin regulatory light chain and inhibits neurite outgrowth.
