= Sodium-hydrogen antiporter 3 regulator 1 =

Protein-coding gene in humans

NHERF1
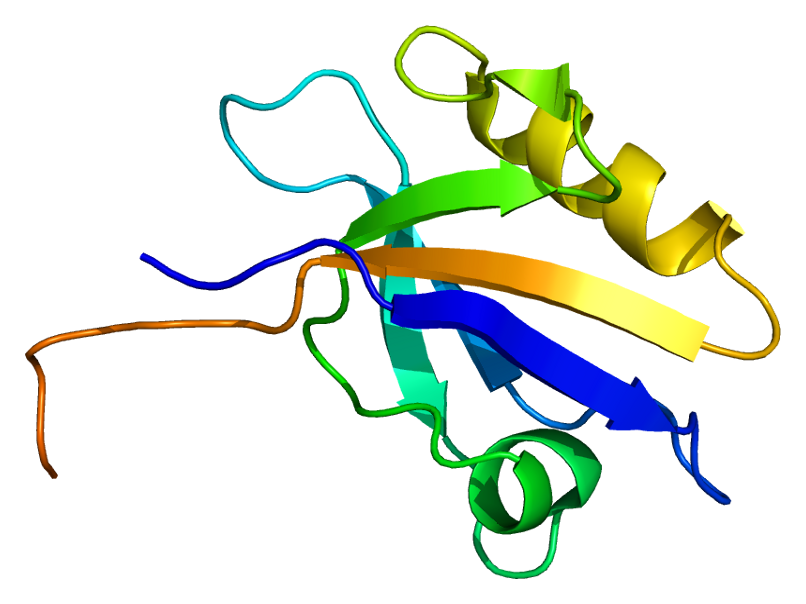

Identifiers
- Aliases: NHERF1, EBP50, NHERF, NHERF-1, NPHLOP2, Sodium-hydrogen antiporter 3 regulator 1, SLC9A3 regulator 1, SLC9A3R1
- External IDs: OMIM: 604990; MGI: 1349482; GeneCards: NHERF1
Available structures
PDB	Ortholog search: PDBe RCSB
PDB	List of PDB id codes 1G9O, 1GQ4, 1GQ5, 1I92, 2D10, 2JXO, 2KJD, 2KRG, 2M0T, 2M0U, 2M0V, 2OZF, 4JL7, 4LMM, 4MPA, 4N6X, 4PQW, 4Q3H

Gene location (Human)
Chr.	Chromosome 17 (human)
Band	17q25.1	Start	74,748,628 bp
Band	17q25.1	End	74,769,353 bp

Gene location (Mouse)
Chr.	Chromosome 11 (mouse)
Band	11|11 E2	Start	115,054,167 bp
Band	11|11 E2	End	115,072,007 bp
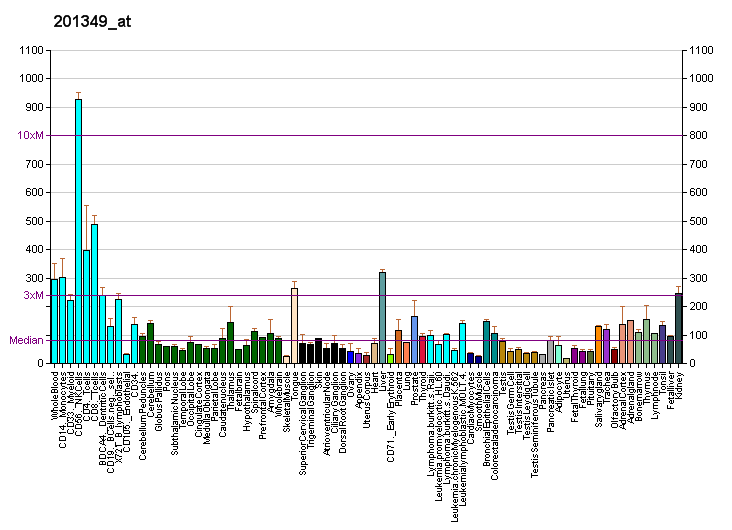
RNA expression pattern
Bgee	Human / Mouse (ortholog); Top expressed in: granulocyte; olfactory zone of nasal mucosa; mucosa of transverse colon; right adrenal gland; mucosa of ileum; right adrenal cortex; right lobe of liver; jejunal mucosa; left adrenal cortex; minor salivary glands / Top expressed in: jejunum; retinal pigment epithelium; yolk sac; ileum; duodenum; left lobe of liver; granulocyte; right kidney; left colon; primitive streak; More reference expression data
BioGPS	More reference expression data
Gene ontology
Molecular function	protein self-association; growth factor receptor binding; dopamine receptor binding; beta-catenin binding; beta-2 adrenergic receptor binding; phosphatase binding; signaling receptor binding; molecular adaptor activity; protein binding; protein-containing complex binding; protein domain specific binding; chloride channel regulator activity; PDZ domain binding; myosin II binding; protein N-terminus binding
Cellular component	brush border membrane; vesicle; endomembrane system; nucleus; cell periphery; cell projection; actin cytoskeleton; perinuclear region of cytoplasm; apical part of cell; ruffle; stereocilium; extracellular exosome; membrane; membrane raft; microvillus membrane; cytoplasm; microvillus; stereocilium tip; apical plasma membrane; sperm midpiece; filopodium; plasma membrane; intracellular membrane-bounded organelle
Biological process	negative regulation of cell population proliferation; regulation of protein kinase activity; positive regulation of intrinsic apoptotic signaling pathway; regulation of cell size; actin cytoskeleton organization; renal absorption; regulation of sodium:proton antiporter activity; phospholipase C-activating dopamine receptor signaling pathway; microvillus assembly; bile acid secretion; cAMP-mediated signaling; establishment of Golgi localization; hearing; renal phosphate ion absorption; gland morphogenesis; negative regulation of cell motility; negative regulation of protein kinase B signaling; auditory receptor cell stereocilium organization; negative regulation of phosphatidylinositol 3-kinase signaling; establishment of epithelial cell apical/basal polarity; negative regulation of ERK1 and ERK2 cascade; adenylate cyclase-activating dopamine receptor signaling pathway; regulation of excretion; cellular phosphate ion homeostasis; negative regulation of mitotic cell cycle; glutathione transport; renal sodium ion transport; negative regulation of sodium:proton antiporter activity; negative regulation of platelet-derived growth factor receptor signaling pathway; negative regulation of cell migration; regulation of cell shape; Wnt signaling pathway; negative regulation of sodium ion transport; nuclear migration; protein localization to plasma membrane; positive regulation of ion transmembrane transport; protein-containing complex assembly; negative regulation of canonical Wnt signaling pathway
Sources:Amigo / QuickGO
Orthologs
Databases	NCBI: entry; OMA: entry
Species	Human	Mouse
Entrez	9368	26941
Ensembl	ENSG00000109062	ENSMUSG00000020733
UniProt	O14745	P70441
RefSeq (mRNA)	NM_004252	NM_012030
RefSeq (protein)	NP_004243	NP_036160
Location (UCSC)	Chr 17: 74.75 – 74.77 Mb	Chr 11: 115.05 – 115.07 Mb
PubMed search
- Wikidata
View/Edit Human	View/Edit Mouse

Sodium-hydrogen antiporter 3 regulator 1 (SLC9A3R1) is a protein that in humans is encoded by the NHERF1 gene (previously SLC9A3R1). It is a regulator of Sodium-hydrogen antiporter 3. It is also known as ERM Binding Protein 50 (EBP50) or Na+/H+ Exchanger Regulatory Factor (NHERF1). It is believed to interact via long-range allostery, involving significant protein dynamics.

== Mechanism ==
Members of the ezrin (VIL2; MIM 123900)-radixin (RDX; MIM 179410)-moesin (MSN; MIM 309845) (ERM) protein family are highly concentrated in the apical aspect of polarized epithelial cells. These cells are studded with microvilli containing bundles of actin filaments, which must attach to the membrane to assemble and maintain the microvilli. The ERM proteins, together with merlin, the NF2 (MIM 607379) gene product, are thought to be linkers between integral membrane and cytoskeletal proteins, and they bind directly to actin in vitro. Actin cytoskeleton reorganization requires the activation of a sodium/hydrogen exchanger (SLC9A3; MIM 182307). SLC9A3R1 is an ERM-binding protein.[supplied by OMIM]

== Interactions ==
Sodium-hydrogen antiporter 3 regulator 1 has been shown to interact with:

- ADRB2,
- Beta-catenin,
- CFTR,
- GNAQ,
- OPRK1,
- PAG1,
- PDGFRA,
- PDGFRB,
- PDZK1,
- PTH1R,
- SLC4A8,
- YAP1, and
- EZR

== See also ==
- Cystic fibrosis transmembrane conductance regulator
- Ezrin
- Moesin
- Neutron spin echo
- Radixin
- Solute carrier family
