= Merlin (protein) =

Mammalian protein found in Homo sapiens

NF2
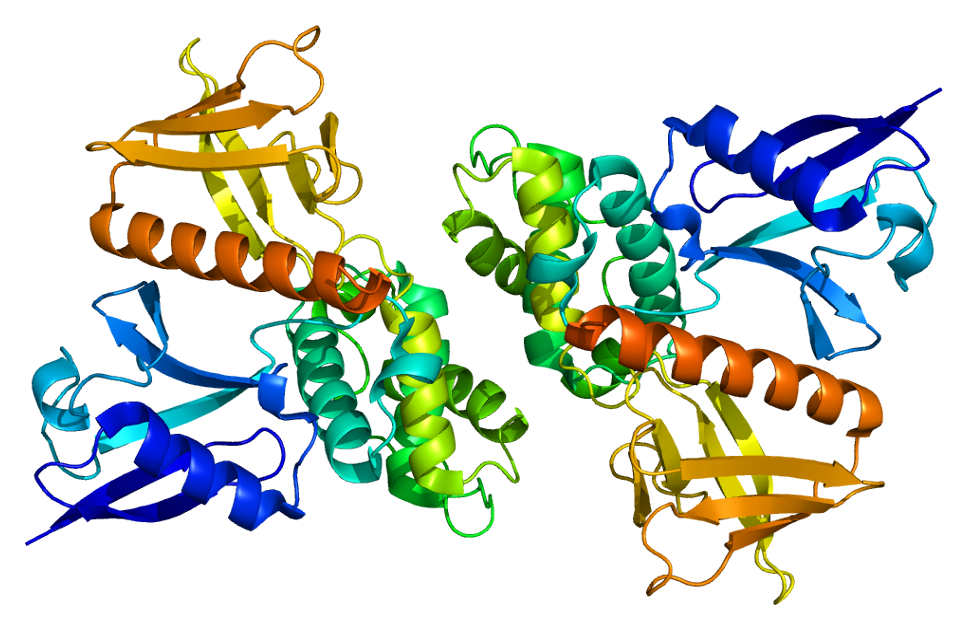

Identifiers
- Aliases: NF2, ACN, BANF, SCH, neurofibromin 2 (merlin), neurofibromin 2, merlin-1, moesin-ezrin-radixin like (MERLIN) tumor suppressor
- External IDs: OMIM: 607379; MGI: 97307; GeneCards: NF2
Available structures
PDB	Ortholog search: PDBe RCSB
PDB	List of PDB id codes 4ZRJ, 1H4R, 3U8Z, 4ZRI

Gene location (Human)
Chr.	Chromosome 22 (human)
Band	22q12.2	Start	29,603,556 bp
Band	22q12.2	End	29,698,598 bp

Gene location (Mouse)
Chr.	Chromosome 11 (mouse)
Band	11 A1|11 3.0 cM	Start	4,715,845 bp
Band	11 A1|11 3.0 cM	End	4,799,536 bp
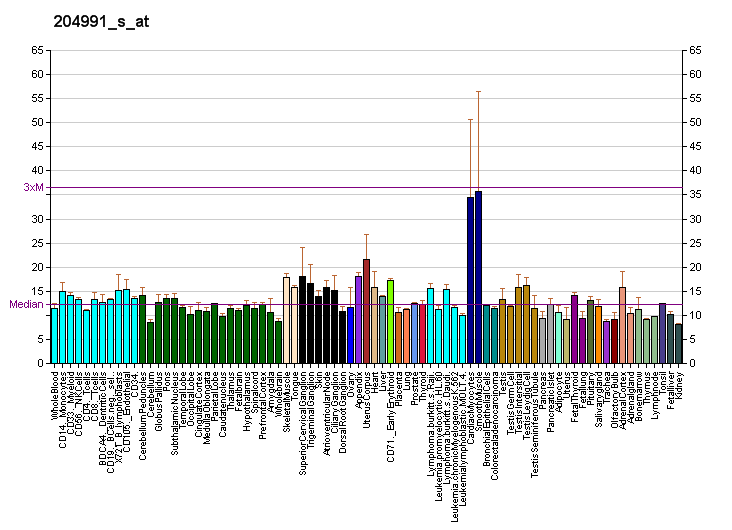

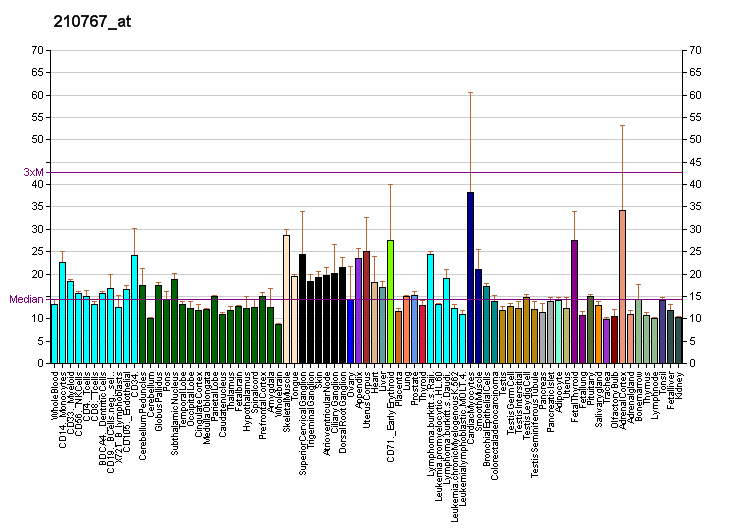

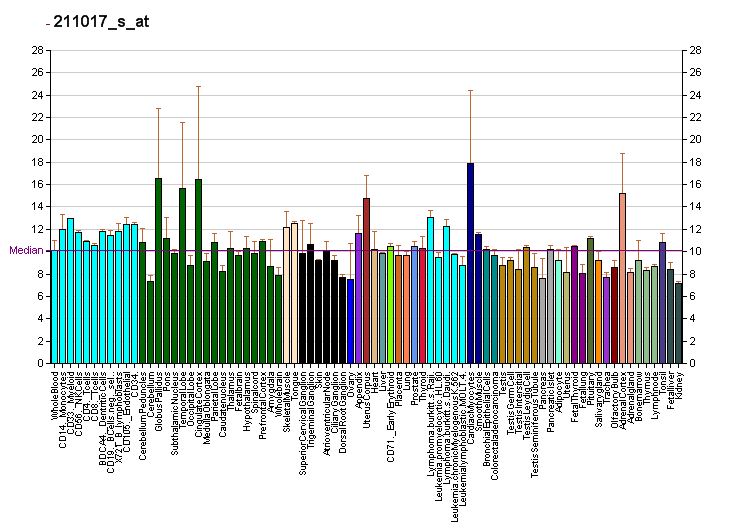
RNA expression pattern
Bgee	Human / Mouse (ortholog); Top expressed in: stromal cell of endometrium; dorsal motor nucleus of vagus nerve; tendon of biceps brachii; Region I of hippocampus proper; glutes; postcentral gyrus; vastus lateralis muscle; triceps brachii muscle; entorhinal cortex; inferior olivary nucleus / Top expressed in: gastrula; saccule; otic vesicle; neural layer of retina; otic placode; submandibular gland; muscle of thigh; secondary oocyte; molar; myocardium of ventricle; More reference expression data
BioGPS	More reference expression data
Gene ontology
Molecular function	cytoskeletal protein binding; protein binding; actin binding
Cellular component	cytoplasm; cell body; cell projection; membrane; filopodium; ruffle; adherens junction; plasma membrane; apical part of cell; ruffle membrane; early endosome; nucleolus; cortical actin cytoskeleton; perinuclear region of cytoplasm; neuron projection; cleavage furrow; cytoskeleton; nucleus; lamellipodium; filopodium membrane; cytosol
Biological process	negative regulation of receptor signaling pathway via JAK-STAT; regulation of gliogenesis; cell-cell junction organization; regulation of protein stability; negative regulation of cell-cell adhesion; negative regulation of protein kinase activity; mesoderm formation; ectoderm development; negative regulation of DNA replication; Schwann cell proliferation; regulation of neural precursor cell proliferation; regulation of protein localization to nucleus; negative regulation of cell-matrix adhesion; odontogenesis of dentin-containing tooth; brain development; negative regulation of cell migration; lens fiber cell differentiation; regulation of cell population proliferation; positive regulation of cell differentiation; negative regulation of MAPK cascade; regulation of hippo signaling; hippocampus development; regulation of stem cell proliferation; regulation of neurogenesis; actin cytoskeleton organization; positive regulation of stress fiber assembly; negative regulation of cell population proliferation; negative regulation of tyrosine phosphorylation of STAT protein; regulation of apoptotic process; regulation of cell cycle
Sources:Amigo / QuickGO
Orthologs
Databases	NCBI: entry; OMA: entry
Species	Human	Mouse
Entrez	4771	18016
Ensembl	ENSG00000186575	ENSMUSG00000009073
UniProt	P35240	P46662
RefSeq (mRNA)	NM_181835; NM_000268; NM_016418; NM_181825; NM_181826 NM_181827; NM_181828; NM_181829; NM_181830; NM_181831; NM_181832; NM_181833; NM_181834	NM_001252250; NM_001252251; NM_001252252; NM_001252253; NM_010898 NM_001361675; NM_001361676; NM_001361677
RefSeq (protein)	NP_000259; NP_057502; NP_861546; NP_861966; NP_861967 NP_861968; NP_861969; NP_861970; NP_861971	NP_001239179; NP_001239180; NP_001239181; NP_001239182; NP_035028 NP_001348604; NP_001348605; NP_001348606
Location (UCSC)	Chr 22: 29.6 – 29.7 Mb	Chr 11: 4.72 – 4.8 Mb
PubMed search
- Wikidata
View/Edit Human	View/Edit Mouse

Merlin (also called neurofibromin 2 or schwannomin) is a cytoskeletal protein. In humans, it is a tumor suppressor protein involved in neurofibromatosis type II. Sequence data reveal its similarity to the ERM protein family.

Merlin is an acronym for "Moesin-Ezrin-Radixin-like protein".

== Gene ==
Human merlin is coded by the gene NF2 in chromosome 22. Mouse merlin gene is located on chromosome 11 and rat merlin gene on chromosome 17. Fruit fly merlin gene (symbol Mer) is located on chromosome 1 and shares 58% similarity to its human homologue. Other merlin-like genes are known from a wide range of animals, and the derivation of merlin is thought to be in early metazoa. Merlin is a member of the ERM family of proteins including ezrin, moesin, and radixin, which are in the protein 4.1 superfamily of proteins. Merlin is also known as schwannomin, a name derived from the most common type of tumor in the NF2 patient phenotype, the schwannoma.

== Structure ==
Vertebrate merlin is a 70 kDa protein. There are 10 known isoforms of human merlin molecule (the full molecule being 595 amino acids in length). The two most common of these are also found in the mouse and are called type 1 and type 2, differing by the absence or presence of exon 16 or 17, respectively). All the known varieties have a conserved N-terminal part, which contains a FERM domain (a domain found in most cytoskeletal-membrane organizing proteins). The FERM domain is followed by an alpha-helical domain and a hydrophilic tail. Merlin can dimerize with itself and heterodimerize with other ERM family proteins.

== Function ==
Merlin is a membrane-cytoskeleton scaffolding protein, i.e. linking actin filaments to cell membrane or membrane glycoproteins. Human merlin is predominantly found in nervous tissue, but also in several other fetal tissues, and is mainly located in adherens junctions. Its tumor suppressor properties are probably associated with contact-mediated growth inhibition. Drosophila merlin is expressed in embryonic hindgut, salivary glands, and imaginal discs, and has apparently a slightly different role than in vertebrates.

The phosphorylation of serine 518 is known to alter the functional state of merlin. The signaling pathway of merlin is proposed to include several salient cell growth controlling molecules, including eIF3c, CD44, protein kinase A, and p21 activated kinases.

Work in Drosophila identified Merlin as an upstream regulator of the Hippo tumor suppressor pathway, a function that is conserved in mammals. The Hippo pathway is a well conserved signalling pathway that coordinately regulates cell proliferation and apoptosis.

Mutations of the NF2 gene cause a human autosomal dominant disease called neurofibromatosis type 2. It is characterized by the development of tumors of the nervous system, most commonly of bilateral vestibular schwannomas (also called acoustic neuromas). NF2 belongs to the tumor suppressor group of genes.

== Interactions ==
Merlin (protein) has been shown to interact with:

- CUL4A,
- DDB1,
- EZR,
- HGS,
- MED28,
- RIT1,
- SDCBP,
- SPTBN1, and
- VPRBP.
