= FARP1 =

Protein-coding gene in the species Homo sapiens

Identifiers
- Aliases: FARP1, CDEP, FARP1-IT1, PLEKHC2, PPP1R75, FERM, ARH/RhoGEF and pleckstrin domain protein 1
- External IDs: OMIM: 602654; MGI: 2446173; GeneCards: FARP1
Available structures
PDB	Ortholog search: PDBe RCSB
PDB	List of PDB id codes 4H6Y

Gene location (Human)
Chr.	Chromosome 13 (human)
Band	13q32.2	Start	98,142,562 bp
Band	13q32.2	End	98,455,176 bp

Gene location (Mouse)
Chr.	Chromosome 14 (mouse)
Band	14|14 E5	Start	121,272,612 bp
Band	14|14 E5	End	121,521,156 bp
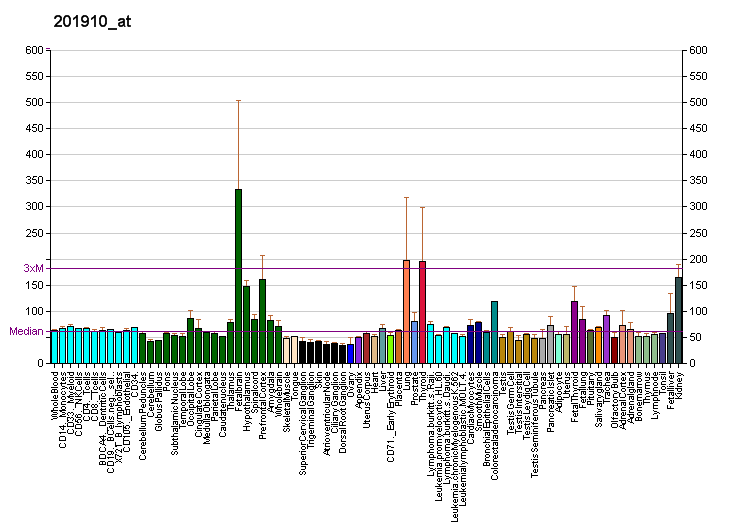
RNA expression pattern
Bgee	Human / Mouse (ortholog); Top expressed in: renal medulla; stromal cell of endometrium; corpus epididymis; ganglionic eminence; human kidney; ventricular zone; epithelium of colon; right lobe of liver; parotid gland; thyroid gland / Top expressed in: internal carotid artery; external carotid artery; mandibular prominence; molar; maxillary prominence; hand; Gonadal ridge; medullary collecting duct; vas deferens; pituitary gland; More reference expression data
BioGPS	More reference expression data
Gene ontology
Molecular function	guanyl-nucleotide exchange factor activity; cytoskeletal protein binding
Cellular component	cytosol; cell projection; membrane; filopodium; extrinsic component of cytoplasmic side of plasma membrane; plasma membrane; dendritic spine; synapse; cell junction; dendrite; neuron projection; cytoskeleton; cytoplasm
Biological process	dendrite morphogenesis; negative regulation of phosphatase activity; multicellular organism development; synapse assembly; regulation of Rho protein signal transduction
Sources:Amigo / QuickGO
Orthologs
Databases	NCBI: entry; OMA: entry
Species	Human	Mouse
Entrez	10160	223254
Ensembl	ENSG00000152767	ENSMUSG00000025555
UniProt	Q9Y4F1	F8VPU2
RefSeq (mRNA)	NM_001001715; NM_001286839; NM_005766	NM_134082
RefSeq (protein)	NP_001001715; NP_001273768; NP_005757	NP_598843
Location (UCSC)	Chr 13: 98.14 – 98.46 Mb	Chr 14: 121.27 – 121.52 Mb
PubMed search
- Wikidata
View/Edit Human	View/Edit Mouse

FERM, RhoGEF and pleckstrin domain-containing protein 1 is a protein that in humans is encoded by the FARP1 gene.

This gene was originally isolated through subtractive hybridization due to its increased expression in differentiated chondrocytes versus dedifferentiated chondrocytes. The resulting protein contains a predicted ezrin-like domain, a Dbl homology domain, and a pleckstrin homology domain. It is believed to be a member of the band 4.1 superfamily whose members link the cytoskeleton to the cell membrane. Two alternatively spliced transcript variants encoding distinct isoforms have been found for this gene.

== See also ==
- FARP2
- FERM domain
- RhoGEF domain
- Pleckstrin homology domain
