= FARP2 =

Protein-coding gene in the species Homo sapiens

Identifiers
- Aliases: FARP2, FIR, FRG, PLEKHC3, FERM, ARH/RhoGEF and pleckstrin domain protein 2
- External IDs: OMIM: 617586; MGI: 2385126; GeneCards: FARP2
Available structures
PDB	Ortholog search: PDBe RCSB
PDB	List of PDB id codes 4GYV, 4GZU

Gene location (Human)
Chr.	Chromosome 2 (human)
Band	2q37.3	Start	241,356,285 bp
Band	2q37.3	End	241,494,841 bp

Gene location (Mouse)
Chr.	Chromosome 1 (mouse)
Band	1|1 D	Start	93,439,801 bp
Band	1|1 D	End	93,549,698 bp
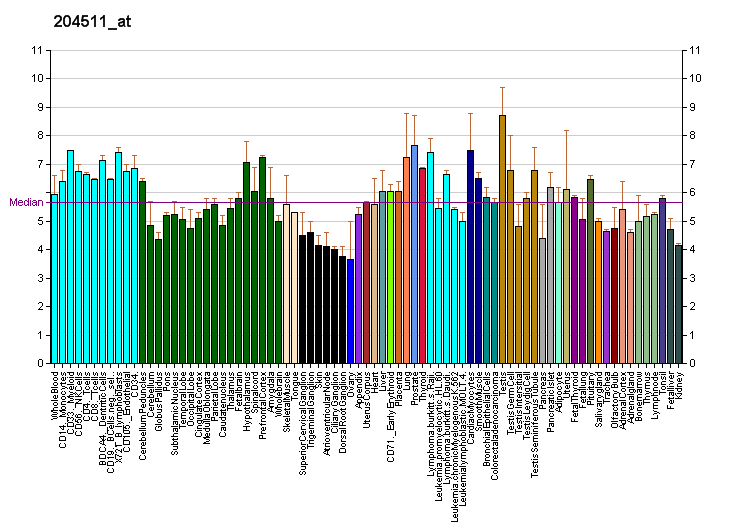
RNA expression pattern
Bgee	Human / Mouse (ortholog); Top expressed in: epithelium of colon; sural nerve; right testis; left testis; right hemisphere of cerebellum; skin of leg; skin of abdomen; rectum; mucosa of sigmoid colon; mucosa of transverse colon / Top expressed in: fossa; calvaria; primary oocyte; zygote; retinal pigment epithelium; left lobe of liver; secondary oocyte; epithelium of lens; body of femur; molar; More reference expression data
BioGPS	More reference expression data
Gene ontology
Molecular function	cytoskeletal protein binding; guanyl-nucleotide exchange factor activity
Cellular component	cytosol; cytoskeleton; cytoplasm
Biological process	osteoclast differentiation; neuron remodeling; actin cytoskeleton reorganization; regulation of integrin activation; podosome assembly; cell adhesion; Rac protein signal transduction; regulation of Rho protein signal transduction; semaphorin-plexin signaling pathway; hair cycle process
Sources:Amigo / QuickGO
Orthologs
Databases	NCBI: entry; OMA: entry
Species	Human	Mouse
Entrez	9855	227377
Ensembl	ENSG00000006607	ENSMUSG00000034066
UniProt	O94887	Q91VS8
RefSeq (mRNA)	NM_001282983; NM_001282984; NM_014808	NM_145519
RefSeq (protein)	NP_001269912; NP_001269913; NP_055623	NP_663494
Location (UCSC)	Chr 2: 241.36 – 241.49 Mb	Chr 1: 93.44 – 93.55 Mb
PubMed search
- Wikidata
View/Edit Human	View/Edit Mouse

FERM, RhoGEF and pleckstrin domain-containing protein 2 is a protein that in humans is encoded by the FARP2 gene.

== Interactions ==
FARP2 has been shown to interact with PDZK1.

== See also ==
- FARP1
- FERM domain
- RhoGEF domain
- Pleckstrin homology domain
