= CLEC4M =

Protein-coding gene in humans

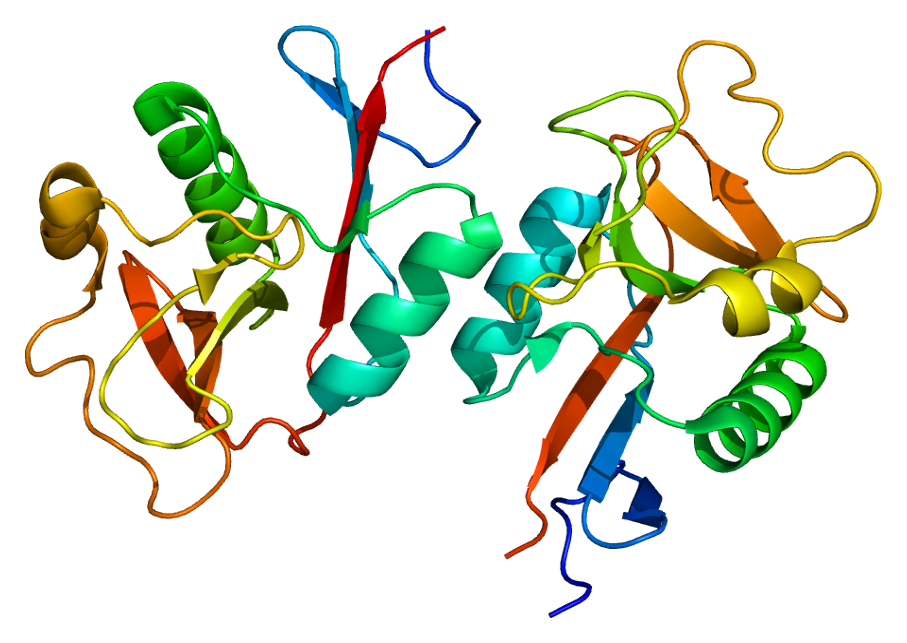

Identifiers
- Aliases: CLEC4M, CD209L, CD299, DC-SIGN2, DC-SIGNR, DCSIGNR, HP10347, L-SIGN, LSIGN, C-type lectin domain family 4 member M
- External IDs: OMIM: 605872; MGI: 2157942; GeneCards: CLEC4M
Available structures
PDB	Ortholog search: PDBe RCSB
PDB	List of PDB id codes 1K9J, 1SL6, 1XAR, 1XPH, 3JQH

Gene location (Human)
Chr.	Chromosome 19 (human)
Band	19p13.2	Start	7,763,210 bp
Band	19p13.2	End	7,769,605 bp

Gene location (Mouse)
Chr.	Chromosome 8 (mouse)
Band	8|8 A1.1	Start	3,793,397 bp
Band	8|8 A1.1	End	3,798,984 bp
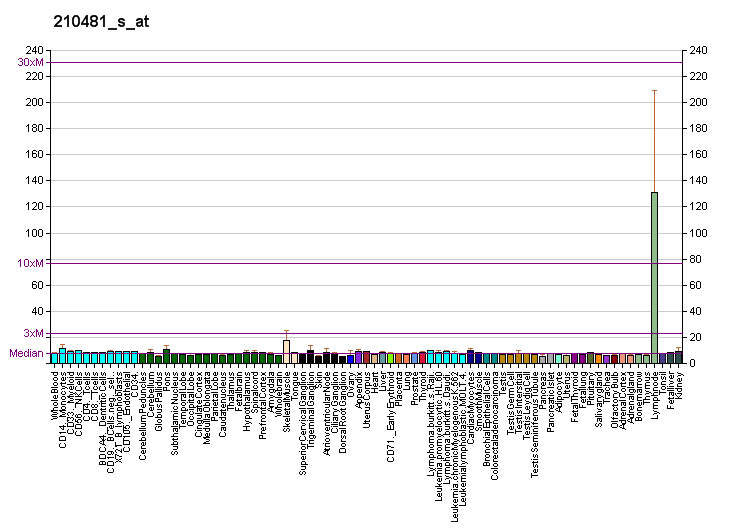

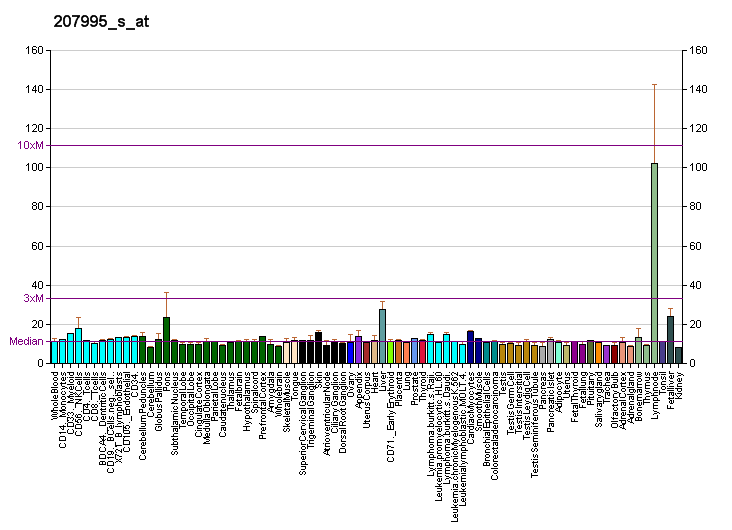
RNA expression pattern
Bgee	Human / Mouse (ortholog); Top expressed in: right lobe of liver; germinal epithelium; lymph node; pancreatic ductal cell; right lung; testicle; placenta; left ovary; right adrenal gland; left adrenal cortex / Top expressed in: granulocyte; lip; skin of abdomen; right kidney; muscle of thigh; spleen; right lung lobe; white adipose tissue; carotid body; skin of external ear; More reference expression data
BioGPS	More reference expression data
Gene ontology
Molecular function	peptide antigen binding; virus receptor activity; metal ion binding; calcium-dependent protein binding; mannose binding; virion binding; ICAM-3 receptor activity; carbohydrate binding; signaling receptor activity; protein binding
Cellular component	cytoplasm; integral component of membrane; membrane; plasma membrane; integral component of plasma membrane; extracellular region; host cell
Biological process	leukocyte cell-cell adhesion; cell-cell recognition; intracellular transport of virus; intracellular signal transduction; antigen processing and presentation; endocytosis; adaptive immune response; immune system process; viral genome replication; peptide antigen transport; modulation by virus of host process; innate immune response; viral process; virion attachment to host cell; viral entry into host cell
Sources:Amigo / QuickGO
Orthologs
Databases	NCBI: entry; OMA: entry
Species	Human	Mouse
Entrez	10332	170786
Ensembl	ENSG00000104938	ENSMUSG00000031494
UniProt	Q9H2X3	Q91ZX1
RefSeq (mRNA)	NM_001144904; NM_001144905; NM_001144906; NM_001144907; NM_001144908 NM_001144909; NM_001144910; NM_001144911; NM_014257; NM_214675; NM_214676	NM_133238
RefSeq (protein)	NP_001138376; NP_001138377; NP_001138378; NP_001138379; NP_001138380 NP_001138381; NP_001138382; NP_001138383; NP_055072	NP_573501
Location (UCSC)	Chr 19: 7.76 – 7.77 Mb	Chr 8: 3.79 – 3.8 Mb
PubMed search
- Wikidata
View/Edit Human	View/Edit Mouse

C-type lectin domain family 4 member M is a protein that in humans is encoded by the CLEC4M gene. CLEC4M has also been designated as CD299 (cluster of differentiation 299).

This gene encodes L-SIGN (liver/lymph node-specific intracellular adhesion molecules-3 grabbing non-integrin), a type II integral membrane protein that is 77% identical to CD209 antigen, an HIV gp120-binding protein. This protein, like CD209, efficiently binds both intercellular adhesion molecule 3 (ICAM3) and HIV-1 gp120, and enhances HIV-1 infection of T cells. This gene is mapped to 19p13.3, in a cluster with the CD209 and CD23/FCER2 genes. Multiple alternatively spliced transcript variants have been found for this gene, but the biological validity of some variants has not been determined.
