= CD43 =

Mammalian protein found in humans

SPN

Identifiers
- Aliases: SPN, CD43, GALGP, GPL115, LSN, sialophorin, LEU-22
- External IDs: OMIM: 182160; MGI: 98384; GeneCards: SPN

Gene location (Human)
Chr.	Chromosome 16 (human)
Band	16p11.2	Start	29,662,979 bp
Band	16p11.2	End	29,670,876 bp

Gene location (Mouse)
Chr.	Chromosome 7 (mouse)
Band	7 F3|7 69.35 cM	Start	126,731,404 bp
Band	7 F3|7 69.35 cM	End	126,736,995 bp
RNA expression pattern
Bgee	Human / Mouse (ortholog); Top expressed in: buccal mucosa cell; granulocyte; monocyte; tendon of biceps brachii; sperm; pancreatic ductal cell; bone marrow cell; vena cava; triceps brachii muscle; internal globus pallidus / Top expressed in: blood; granulocyte; thymus; lymph node; mesenteric lymph nodes; spleen; decidua; tibiofemoral joint; body of femur; submandibular gland; More reference expression data
BioGPS	n/a
Gene ontology
Molecular function	transmembrane signaling receptor activity; Hsp70 protein binding; heat shock protein binding
Cellular component	integral component of membrane; membrane; plasma membrane; integral component of plasma membrane; basement membrane; cell surface; uropod; extracellular exosome; external side of plasma membrane; extracellular space
Biological process	negative regulation of cell adhesion; positive regulation of protein phosphorylation; negative regulation of type IV hypersensitivity; response to protozoan; T cell costimulation; negative thymic T cell selection; chemotaxis; establishment or maintenance of cell polarity; cellular defense response; cell surface receptor signaling pathway; negative regulation of T cell proliferation; defense response to bacterium; immune response; positive regulation of T cell proliferation; regulation of immune response; apoptotic signaling pathway; regulation of defense response to virus; negative regulation of T cell activation; leukocyte migration; signal transduction
Sources:Amigo / QuickGO
Orthologs
Databases	NCBI: entry; OMA: entry
Species	Human	Mouse
Entrez	6693	20737
Ensembl	ENSG00000197471	ENSMUSG00000051457
UniProt	P16150	P15702
RefSeq (mRNA)	NM_001030288; NM_003123	NM_001037810; NM_009259
RefSeq (protein)	NP_001025459; NP_003114	NP_001032899; NP_033285
Location (UCSC)	Chr 16: 29.66 – 29.67 Mb	Chr 7: 126.73 – 126.74 Mb
PubMed search
- Wikidata
View/Edit Human	View/Edit Mouse

Leukosialin also known as sialophorin or CD43 (cluster of differentiation 43) is a transmembrane cell surface protein that in humans is encoded by the SPN (sialophorin) gene.

== Function ==
Sialophorin (leukosialin) is a major sialoglycoprotein on the surface of human T lymphocytes, monocytes, granulocytes, and some B lymphocytes, which appears to be important for immune function and may be part of a physiologic ligand-receptor complex involved in T-cell activation.

== Clinical significance ==
Defects in the CD43 molecule are associated with the development of Wiskott–Aldrich syndrome. It also appears in about 25% of intestinal MALTomas. Using immunohistochemistry, CD43 can be demonstrated in the paracortical T-cells of healthy lymph nodes and tonsils; it is also positive in a range of lymphoid and myeloid tumours. Although it is present in over 90% of T-cell lymphomas, it is generally less effective at demonstrating this condition than is CD3 antigen. However, it may be useful as part of a panel to demonstrate B-cell lymphoblastic lymphoma, since the malignant cells in this condition are often CD43 positive, and may be difficult to stain with other antibodies. Because it stains granulocytes and their precursors, it is also an effective marker for myeloid tumours.

== Interactions ==
CD43 has been shown to interact with EZR and Moesin.
