= ICAM2 =

Protein-coding gene in the species Homo sapiens

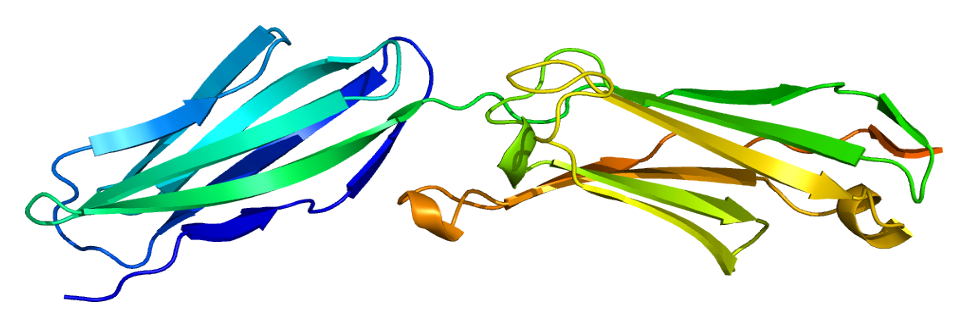

Identifiers
- Aliases: ICAM2, CD102, intercellular adhesion molecule 2
- External IDs: OMIM: 146630; MGI: 96394; GeneCards: ICAM2
Available structures
PDB	Ortholog search: PDBe RCSB
PDB	List of PDB id codes 1ZXQ

Gene location (Human)
Chr.	Chromosome 17 (human)
Band	17q23.3	Start	64,002,594 bp
Band	17q23.3	End	64,020,634 bp

Gene location (Mouse)
Chr.	Chromosome 11 (mouse)
Band	11 E1|11 69.09 cM	Start	106,268,482 bp
Band	11 E1|11 69.09 cM	End	106,278,901 bp
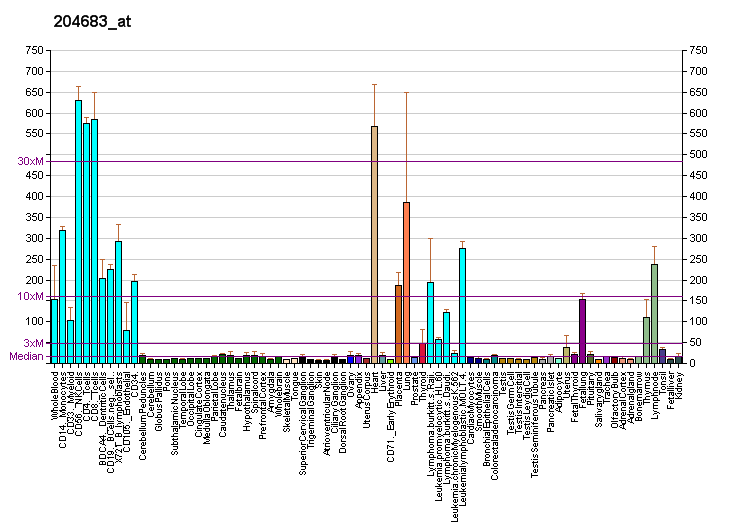

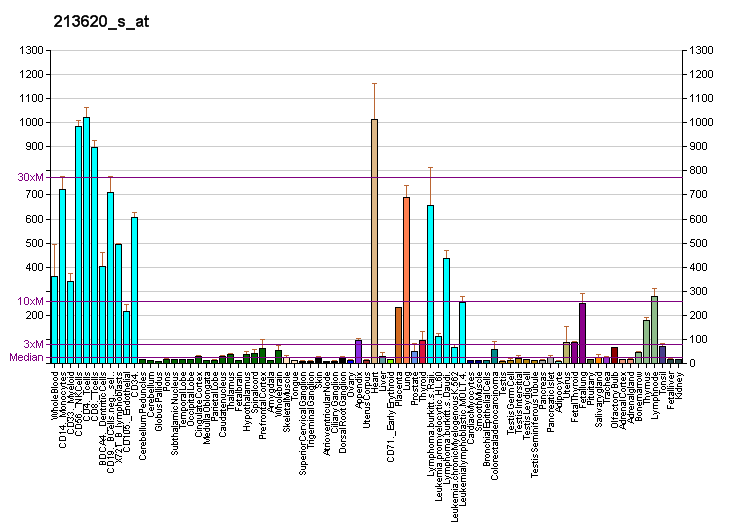
RNA expression pattern
Bgee	Human / Mouse (ortholog); Top expressed in: spleen; granulocyte; vena cava; pericardium; apex of heart; right lung; upper lobe of lung; upper lobe of left lung; abdominal fat; lower lobe of lung / Top expressed in: right lung lobe; left lung; left lung lobe; thymus; endocardial cushion; atrioventricular valve; carotid body; dermis; external carotid artery; renal corpuscle; More reference expression data
BioGPS	More reference expression data
Gene ontology
Molecular function	integrin binding
Cellular component	integral component of membrane; plasma membrane; uropod; extracellular exosome; membrane; cell periphery; integral component of plasma membrane; cleavage furrow; microvillus; cell projection
Biological process	cell adhesion; stimulatory C-type lectin receptor signaling pathway; extracellular matrix organization; regulation of immune response; cell-cell adhesion
Sources:Amigo / QuickGO
Orthologs
Databases	NCBI: entry; OMA: entry
Species	Human	Mouse
Entrez	3384	15896
Ensembl	ENSG00000108622	ENSMUSG00000001029
UniProt	P13598	P35330
RefSeq (mRNA)	NM_001099789; NM_000873; NM_001099786; NM_001099787; NM_001099788	NM_010494
RefSeq (protein)	NP_000864; NP_001093256; NP_001093257; NP_001093258; NP_001093259	NP_034624
Location (UCSC)	Chr 17: 64 – 64.02 Mb	Chr 11: 106.27 – 106.28 Mb
PubMed search
- Wikidata
View/Edit Human	View/Edit Mouse

Intercellular adhesion molecule 2 (ICAM2), also known as CD102 (Cluster of Differentiation 102), is a human gene, and the protein resulting from it.

== Protein structure ==
The protein encoded by this gene is a member of the intercellular adhesion molecule (ICAM) family. All ICAM proteins are type I transmembrane glycoproteins, contain 2–9 immunoglobulin-like C2-type domains, and bind to the leukocyte adhesion LFA-1 protein.

== Protein functions ==
ICAM-2 molecules regulate spermatid adhesion on Sertoli cell on the apical side of the blood-testis barrier (towards the lumen), thus playing a major role in spermatogenesis.

This protein may also play a role in lymphocyte recirculation by blocking LFA-1-dependent cell adhesion. It mediates adhesive interactions important for antigen-specific immune response, NK-cell mediated clearance, lymphocyte recirculation, and other cellular interactions important for immune response and surveillance.

== Interactions ==
ICAM2 has been shown to interact with EZR. It has also been shown to bind to P9 (Uniprot: B2UM07), a secreted protein from Akkermansia muciniphila.

== See also ==
- Cluster of differentiation
