= Tenapanor =

Medication

Clinical data
- Trade names: Ibsrela, Xphozah, others
- Other names: Tenapanor hydrochloride
- AHFS/Drugs.com: Monograph
- License data: US DailyMed: Tenapanor
- Routes of administration: By mouth
- Drug class: NHE3 inhibitors
- ATC code: A06AX08 (WHO)

Legal status
- Legal status: CA: ℞-only; US: ℞-only

Identifiers
- IUPAC name: N,N'-(10,17,-dioxo-3,6,21,24-tetraoxa-9,11,16,18-tetraazahexacosane-1,26-diyl)bis([(4S)-6,8-dichloro-2-methyl-1,2,3,4-tetrahydroisoquinolin-4-yl]benzenesulfonamide)
- CAS Number: 1234423-95-0
- PubChem CID: 71587953
- DrugBank: DB11761
- ChemSpider: 32056950
- UNII: WYD79216A6; 50605O2ZNS
- KEGG: D11652; D11653
- ChEMBL: ChEMBL3304485
- CompTox Dashboard (EPA): DTXSID40154016
- ECHA InfoCard: 100.243.471

Chemical and physical data
- Formula: C_{50}H_{66}Cl_{4}N_{8}O_{10}S_{2}
- Molar mass: 1145.04 g·mol^{−1}
- 3D model (JSmol): Interactive image
- SMILES: CN1C[C@H](C2=C(C1)C(=CC(=C2)Cl)Cl)C3=CC(=CC=C3)S(=O)(=O)NCCOCCOCCNC(=O)NCCCCNC(=O)NCCOCCOCCNS(=O)(=O)C4=CC=CC(=C4)[C@@H]5CN(CC6=C5C=C(C=C6Cl)Cl)C
- InChI: InChI=1S/C50H66Cl4N8O10S2/c1-61-31-43(41-27-37(51)29-47(53)45(41)33-61)35-7-5-9-39(25-35)73(65,66)59-15-19-71-23-21-69-17-13-57-49(63)55-11-3-4-12-56-50(64)58-14-18-70-22-24-72-20-16-60-74(67,68)40-10-6-8-36(26-40)44-32-62(2)34-46-42(44)28-38(52)30-48(46)54/h5-10,25-30,43-44,59-60H,3-4,11-24,31-34H2,1-2H3,(H2,55,57,63)(H2,56,58,64)/t43-,44-/m0/s1; Key:DNHPDWGIXIMXSA-CXNSMIOJSA-N

Tenapanor, sold under the brand name Ibsrela among others, is a medication used for the treatment of adults with a disease of the gut called irritable bowel syndrome with constipation commonly referred to as IBS-C. It is used in form of tenapanor hydrochloride. It is also used in the treatment of hyperphosphatemia associated with chronic kidney disease. Tenapanor is a sodium hydrogen exchanger 3 (NHE3) inhibitor.

Tenapanor is a drug developed by Ardelyx and acts as an inhibitor of the sodium-proton exchanger NHE3. This antiporter protein is found in the kidney and intestines and normally acts to regulate the levels of sodium absorbed and secreted by the body. When administered orally, tenapanor selectively inhibits sodium uptake in the intestines, limiting the amount absorbed from food and thereby reduces levels of sodium in the body. This may make it useful in the treatment of chronic kidney disease and hypertension, both of which are exacerbated by excess sodium in the diet.

Tenapanor was approved for medical use in the United States in September 2019. The U.S. Food and Drug Administration (FDA) considers it to be a first-in-class medication.

In October 2023, tenapanor was approved by the FDA for the treatment of hyperphosphatemia.
