= Sodium–hydrogen antiporter 3 =

Protein-coding gene in the species Homo sapiens

SLC9A3

Identifiers
- Aliases: SLC9A3, NHE3, NHE-3, Sodium–hydrogen antiporter 3, DIAR8, solute carrier family 9 member A3
- External IDs: OMIM: 182307; MGI: 105064; GeneCards: SLC9A3

Gene location (Human)
Chr.	Chromosome 5 (human)
Band	5p15.33	Start	470,456 bp
Band	5p15.33	End	524,449 bp

Gene location (Mouse)
Chr.	Chromosome 13 (mouse)
Band	13 C1|13 40.15 cM	Start	74,269,576 bp
Band	13 C1|13 40.15 cM	End	74,317,561 bp
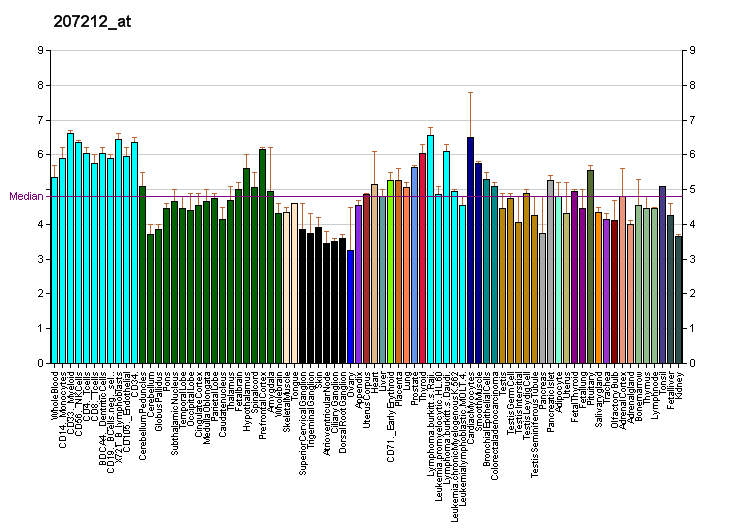
RNA expression pattern
Bgee	Human / Mouse (ortholog); Top expressed in: mucosa of transverse colon; sural nerve; gallbladder; body of stomach; gonad; testicle; right uterine tube; human kidney; appendix; mucosa of esophagus / Top expressed in: jejunum; right kidney; duodenum; human kidney; zygote; large intestine; colon; secondary oocyte; primary oocyte; proximal tubule; More reference expression data
BioGPS	More reference expression data
Gene ontology
Molecular function	protein binding; PDZ domain binding; antiporter activity; solute:proton antiporter activity; potassium:proton antiporter activity; sodium:proton antiporter activity
Cellular component	integral component of membrane; membrane; cell surface; extracellular exosome; plasma membrane; brush border membrane; brush border; apical plasma membrane; vesicle
Biological process	regulation of pH; proton transmembrane transport; ion transport; cation transport; sodium ion transport; potassium ion transmembrane transport; transmembrane transport; regulation of intracellular pH; sodium ion import across plasma membrane; transport; anion transmembrane transport
Sources:Amigo / QuickGO
Orthologs
Databases	NCBI: entry; OMA: entry
Species	Human	Mouse
Entrez	6550	105243
Ensembl	ENSG00000281861; ENSG00000066230	ENSMUSG00000036123
UniProt	P48764	G3X939
RefSeq (mRNA)	NM_001284351; NM_004174	NM_001081060
RefSeq (protein)	NP_001271280; NP_004165	NP_001074529
Location (UCSC)	Chr 5: 0.47 – 0.52 Mb	Chr 13: 74.27 – 74.32 Mb
PubMed search
- Wikidata
View/Edit Human	View/Edit Mouse

Sodium–hydrogen antiporter 3 also known as sodium–hydrogen exchanger 3 (NHE3) or solute carrier family 9 member 3 (SLC9A3) is a protein that in humans is encoded by the SLC9A3 gene.

SLC9A3 is a sodium–hydrogen antiporter. It is found on the apical side of the epithelial cells of the proximal tubule of the nephron of the kidney, in the apical membrane of enterocytes of the intestine, as well as the basolateral side of both duodenal and pancreatic cells responsible for the release of bicarbonate into the duodenal lumen. It is primarily responsible for maintaining the balance of sodium. It is also indirectly linked to buffering of blood pH. The NHE3 antiporter imports one sodium ion into the cytosol of a tubule cell as it ejects one hydrogen ion from the cell into the lumen of the proximal tubule. The sodium within the tubule cell may then be retained by the body rather than excreted in the urine. The NHE3 antiporter indirectly contributes to blood buffering capacity because hydrogen ions that are ejected are the products of the carbonic anhydrase enzyme, which also makes bicarbonate.

== Regulation ==
Protein kinase C stimulates NHE3, while protein kinase A inhibits it.

There is a specific protein functioning as an NHE3 regulator, Sodium-hydrogen antiporter 3 regulator 1.

=== Inhibitors ===
- Tenapanor

=== Stimulators ===
- Insulin stimulates NHE3 and thereby proximal tubule sodium absorption.

== Interactions ==
Sodium–hydrogen antiporter 3 has been shown to interact with CHP.
