= S100P =

Protein-coding gene in the species Homo sapiens

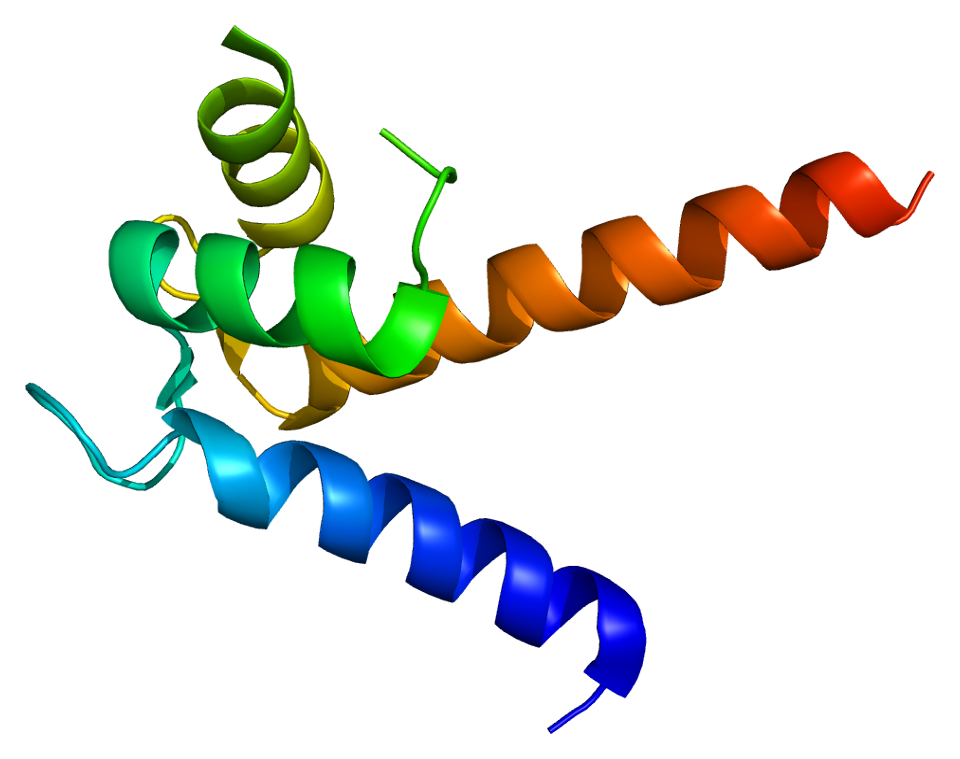

Identifiers
- Aliases: S100P, MIG9, S100 calcium binding protein P
- External IDs: OMIM: 600614; GeneCards: S100P
Available structures
PDB	Human UniProt search: PDBe RCSB
PDB	List of PDB id codes 1J55, 1OZO, 2MJW

Gene location (Human)
Chr.	Chromosome 4 (human)
Band	4p16.1	Start	6,693,878 bp
Band	4p16.1	End	6,697,170 bp
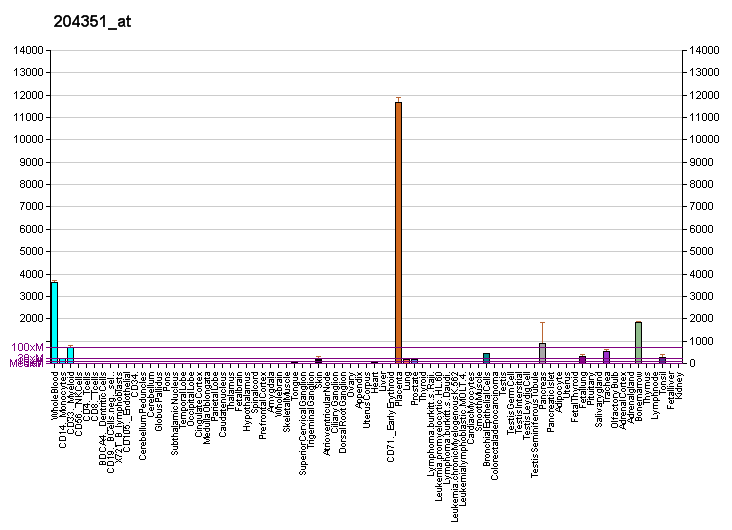
RNA expression pattern
Bgee	Human / Mouse (ortholog); Top expressed in: nasal epithelium; mucosa of urinary bladder; palpebral conjunctiva; olfactory zone of nasal mucosa; bone marrow; amniotic fluid; periodontal fiber; epithelium of nasopharynx; pylorus; testicle / n/a; More reference expression data
BioGPS	More reference expression data
Gene ontology
Molecular function	calcium ion binding; protein binding; RAGE receptor binding; metal ion binding; calcium-dependent protein binding; magnesium ion binding; cadherin binding; transition metal ion binding; protein homodimerization activity
Cellular component	plasma membrane; cell projection; extracellular exosome; membrane; nucleus; microvillus membrane; cytoplasm; extracellular region; nuclear body; secretory granule lumen
Biological process	response to organic substance; endothelial cell migration; neutrophil degranulation
Sources:Amigo / QuickGO
Orthologs
Databases	NCBI: entry; OMA: entry
Species	Human	Mouse
Entrez	6286	n/a
Ensembl	ENSG00000163993	n/a
UniProt	P25815	n/a
RefSeq (mRNA)	NM_005980	n/a
RefSeq (protein)	NP_005971	n/a
Location (UCSC)	Chr 4: 6.69 – 6.7 Mb	n/a
PubMed search		n/a
- Wikidata
View/Edit Human

S100 calcium-binding protein P (S100P) is a protein that in humans is encoded by the S100P gene.

== Function ==
The protein encoded by this gene is a member of the S100 family of proteins containing 2 EF-hand calcium-binding motifs. S100 proteins are localized in the cytoplasm and/or nucleus of a wide range of cells, and involved in the regulation of a number of cellular processes such as cell cycle progression and differentiation. S100 genes include at least 13 members which are located as a cluster on chromosome 1q21; however, this gene is located at 4p16. This protein, in addition to binding Ca^{2+}, also binds Zn^{2+} and Mg^{2+}. This protein may play a role in the etiology of prostate cancer.

== Interactions ==
S100P has been shown to interact with EZR and RAGE. The interactions between S100P and RAGE are disrupted by cromolyn and pentamidine.
