= PAG1 =

Protein-coding gene in the species Homo sapiens

Identifiers
- Aliases: PAG1, CBP, PAG, phosphoprotein membrane anchor with glycosphingolipid microdomains 1
- External IDs: OMIM: 605767; MGI: 2443160; HomoloGene: 10198; GeneCards: PAG1; OMA:PAG1 - orthologs

Gene location (Human)
Chr.	Chromosome 8 (human)
Band	8q21.13	Start	80,967,810 bp
Band	8q21.13	End	81,112,068 bp

Gene location (Mouse)
Chr.	Chromosome 3 (mouse)
Band	3|3 A1	Start	9,752,539 bp
Band	3|3 A1	End	9,898,739 bp
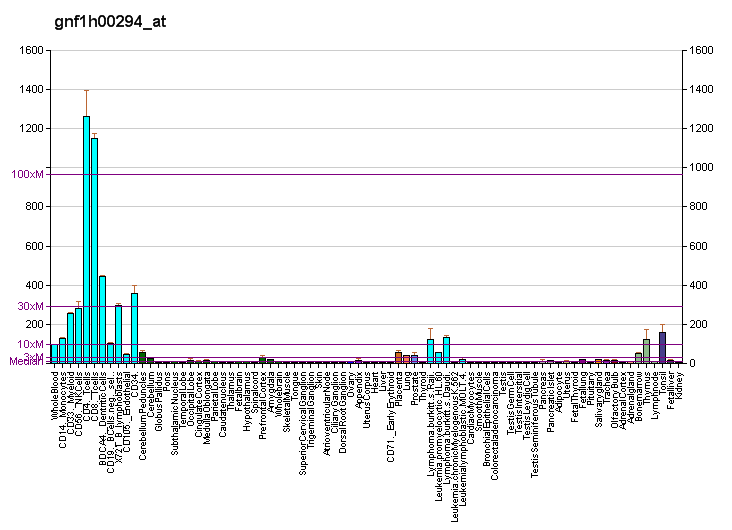
RNA expression pattern
Bgee	Human / Mouse (ortholog); Top expressed in: secondary oocyte; mucosa of ileum; visceral pleura; endothelial cell; lower lobe of lung; jejunal mucosa; spinal ganglia; mucosa of colon; mucosa of sigmoid colon; tibia / Top expressed in: pineal gland; superior cervical ganglion; ciliary body; granulocyte; left lung lobe; substantia nigra; lateral septal nucleus; blood; trigeminal ganglion; iris; More reference expression data
BioGPS	More reference expression data
Gene ontology
Molecular function	SH2 domain binding; protein binding; transmembrane receptor protein tyrosine kinase adaptor activity
Cellular component	integral component of membrane; membrane raft; plasma membrane; membrane; integral component of plasma membrane; intracellular anatomical structure
Biological process	intracellular signal transduction; T cell receptor signaling pathway; adaptive immune response; regulation of T cell activation; signal transduction; immune system process; positive regulation of signal transduction; transmembrane receptor protein tyrosine kinase signaling pathway; negative regulation of T cell activation
Sources:Amigo / QuickGO
Orthologs
Species	Human	Mouse
Entrez	55824	94212
Ensembl	ENSG00000076641	ENSMUSG00000027508
UniProt	Q9NWQ8	Q3U1F9
RefSeq (mRNA)	NM_018440; NM_001007549	NM_001195031; NM_053182
RefSeq (protein)	NP_060910	NP_001181960; NP_444412
Location (UCSC)	Chr 8: 80.97 – 81.11 Mb	Chr 3: 9.75 – 9.9 Mb
PubMed search
- Wikidata
View/Edit Human	View/Edit Mouse

Phosphoprotein associated with glycosphingolipid-enriched microdomains 1 is a protein that in humans is encoded by the PAG1 gene.

The protein encoded by this gene is a type III transmembrane adaptor protein that binds to the tyrosine kinase csk protein. It is thought to be involved in the regulation of T cell activation.

== Interactions ==
PAG1 has been shown to interact with FYN, C-src tyrosine kinase, Sodium-hydrogen antiporter 3 regulator 1 and Abl gene.
