= ICAM3 =

Mammalian protein found in Homo sapiens

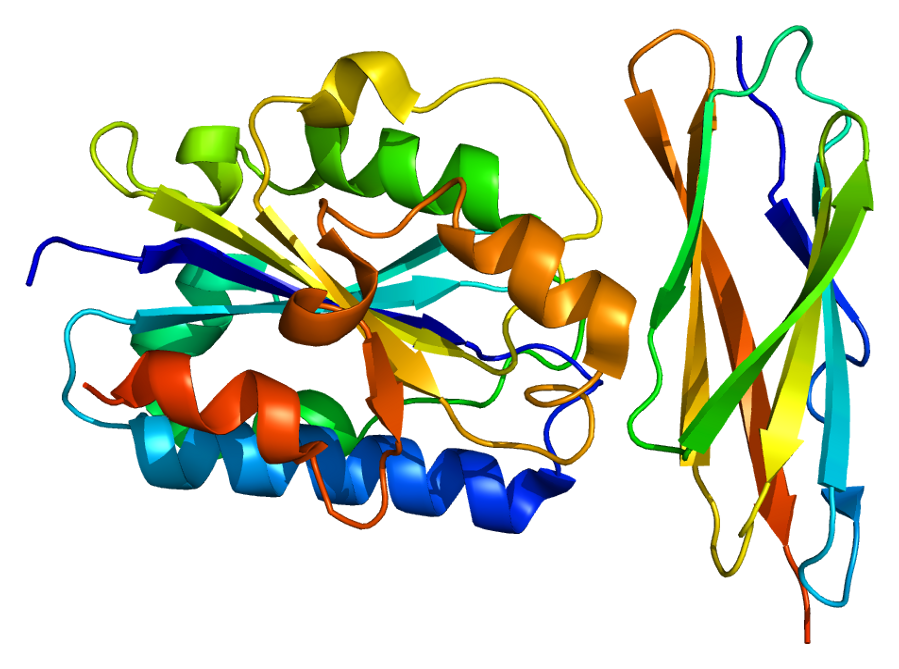

Identifiers
- Aliases: ICAM3, CD50, CDW50, ICAM-R, intercellular adhesion molecule 3
- External IDs: OMIM: 146631; GeneCards: ICAM3
Available structures
PDB	Human UniProt search: PDBe RCSB
PDB	List of PDB id codes 1T0P

Gene location (Human)
Chr.	Chromosome 19 (human)
Band	19p13.2	Start	10,333,776 bp
Band	19p13.2	End	10,339,661 bp
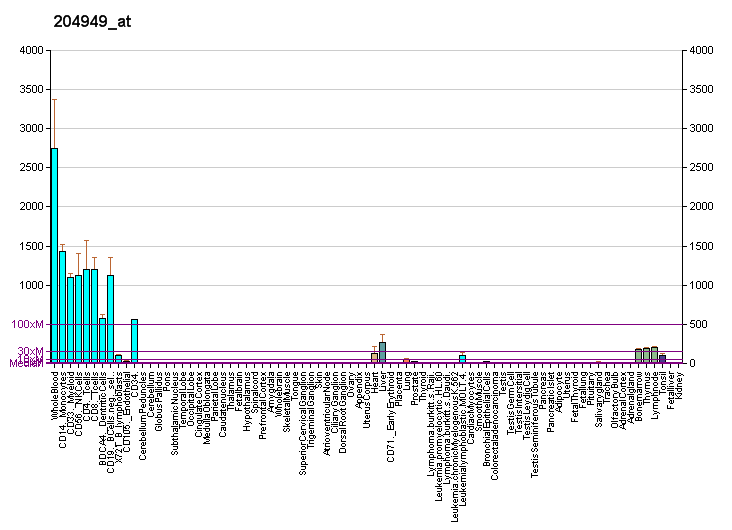
RNA expression pattern
Bgee	Human / Mouse (ortholog); Top expressed in: blood; granulocyte; monocyte; bone marrow cell; trabecular bone; periodontal fiber; spleen; lymph node; right lobe of liver; appendix / n/a; More reference expression data
BioGPS	More reference expression data
Gene ontology
Molecular function	integrin binding; signaling receptor binding; protein binding
Cellular component	integral component of membrane; plasma membrane; integral component of plasma membrane; extracellular exosome; membrane
Biological process	cell adhesion; extracellular matrix organization; stimulatory C-type lectin receptor signaling pathway; regulation of immune response; phagocytosis; cell-cell adhesion
Sources:Amigo / QuickGO
Orthologs
Databases	NCBI: entry; OMA: entry
Species	Human	Mouse
Entrez	3385	n/a
Ensembl	ENSG00000076662	n/a
UniProt	P32942	n/a
RefSeq (mRNA)	NM_002162; NM_001320605; NM_001320606; NM_001320608; NM_001395374 NM_001395375; NM_001395376	n/a
RefSeq (protein)	NP_001307534; NP_001307535; NP_001307537; NP_002153	n/a
Location (UCSC)	Chr 19: 10.33 – 10.34 Mb	n/a
PubMed search		n/a
- Wikidata
View/Edit Human

Intercellular adhesion molecule 3 (ICAM3) also known as CD50 (Cluster of Differentiation 50), is a protein that in humans is encoded by the ICAM3 gene. The protein is constitutively expressed on the surface of leukocytes, which are also called white blood cells and are part of the immune system. ICAM3 mediates adhesion between cells by binding to specific integrin receptors. It plays an important role in the immune cell response through its facilitation of interactions between T cells and dendritic cells, which allows for T cell activation. ICAM3 also mediates the clearance of cells undergoing apoptosis by attracting and binding macrophages, a type of cell that breaks down infected or dying cells through a process known as phagocytosis, to apoptotic cells.

== Protein structure ==
ICAM3 is a 110–160 kDa protein that belongs to the intercellular adhesion molecule (ICAM) family. Like the other proteins in this family, ICAM3 is a type I transmembrane glycoprotein and consists in part of a hydrophobic transmembrane domain and a short domain that extends into the cytoplasm. ICAM3 also contains five extracellular immunoglobulin domains.

== Function ==
ICAM3 is found on the surface of leukocytes, and the ICAM3 gene is constitutively expressed in these cells. Interactions between ICAM3 and specific integrin receptors facilitate adhesion between cells.

=== Dendritic and T cell binding ===
ICAM3 has an important function in the immune cell response, as it helps facilitate initial interactions between T cells and dendritic cells. Resting T cells show high levels of ICAM3 expression. ICAM3 on these T cells can bind to DC-SIGN, a transmembrane receptor present on dendritic cells, creating temporary contact between resting T cells and dendritic cells. This adhesion allows the T cell receptor (TCR) to interact with major histocompatibility complex (MHC) molecules on the surface of the dendritic cell, which, upon binding between the TCR, the MHC, and the peptide coupled to the MHC, facilitates T cell activation.

=== Apoptosis ===
ICAM3 plays a role in apoptotic cell clearance by promoting the movement of macrophages, which ingest and break down unhealthy cells via phagocytosis, to cells undergoing apoptosis. Apoptotic cells can release extracellular vesicles containing ICAM3, which acts as a chemoattractant to phagocytes such as macrophages, directing them toward apoptotic cells. Apoptotic cells also contain altered ICAM3 proteins on their surface. These altered proteins allow macrophages to specifically target and bind apoptotic cells. This process is believed to involve binding between ICAM3 and CD14 receptors, which are a type of cell surface receptor expressed on macrophages and other phagocytes.

=== Mast cells ===
ICAM3 is also found on mast cells, another type of leukocyte. Mast cells taken from human lungs and the HMC-1 line, a human mast cell line, both showed expression of ICAM3. ICAM3 helps mediate the adhesion of mast cells to the extracellular matrix.

== Interactions ==
=== Dendritic and T cell binding ===
Binding between ICAM3 and DC-SIGN, which takes place during initial interactions between T cells and dendritic cells, occurs with high affinity. This binding process is also calcium-dependent.

=== Apoptosis ===
CD14, a receptor expressed on the surface of phagocytes, can also bind ICAM3. Interactions between CD14 and altered ICAM3 molecules on apoptotic cells are believed to help promote phagocytosis of apoptotic cells.

=== Integrins ===
ICAM3 is a known ligand for LFA-1, an integrin expressed by leukocytes. To facilitate binding, the I domain of LFA-1 interacts with the ICAM3 protein's first immunoglobulin domain. ICAM3 also binds the integrin αDβ2.

=== Additional interactions ===
ICAM3 has been shown to interact with activated ERM proteins, including ezrin (EZR) and moesin, in T cells.

== See also ==
- Cluster of differentiation
