= DC-SIGN =

Protein-coding gene in the species Homo sapiens

CD209
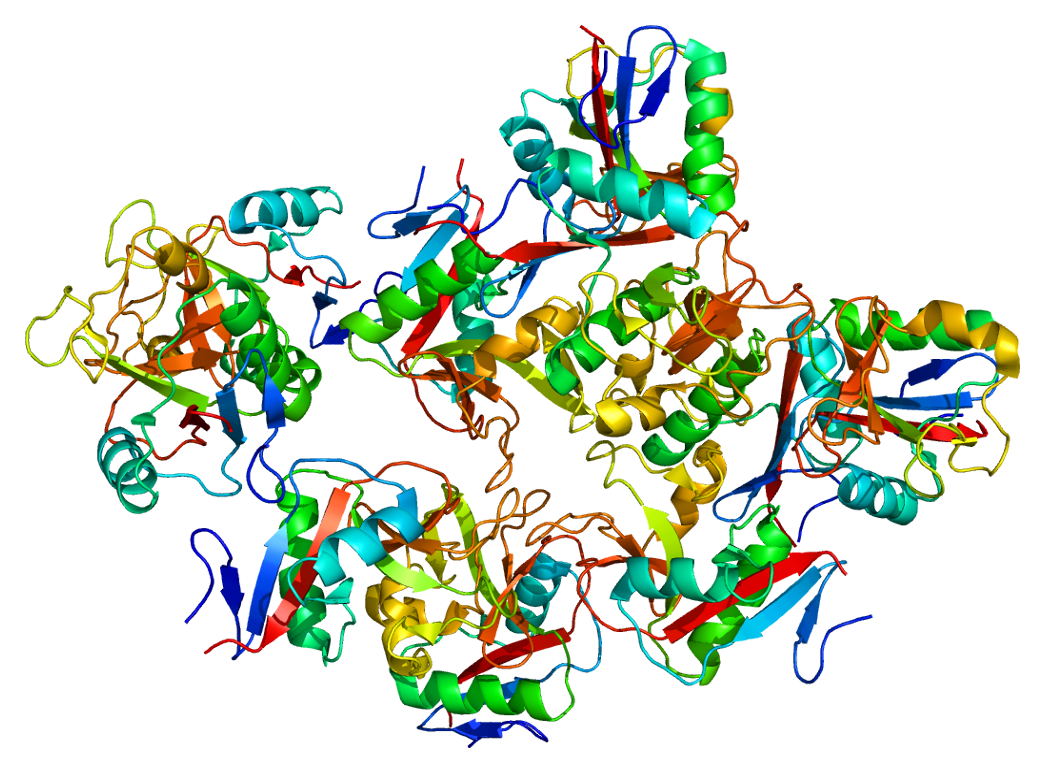

Identifiers
- Aliases: CD209, CDSIGN, CLEC4L, DC-SIGN, DC-SIGN1, CD209 molecule, hDC-SIGN
- External IDs: OMIM: 604672; MGI: 2157948; GeneCards: CD209
Available structures
PDB	Ortholog search: PDBe RCSB
PDB	List of PDB id codes 1K9I, 1SL4, 1SL5, 2B6B, 2IT5, 2IT6, 2XR5, 2XR6

Gene location (Human)
Chr.	Chromosome 19 (human)
Band	19p13.2	Start	7,739,993 bp
Band	19p13.2	End	7,747,564 bp

Gene location (Mouse)
Chr.	Chromosome 8 (mouse)
Band	8|8 A1.1	Start	3,897,965 bp
Band	8|8 A1.1	End	3,904,309 bp
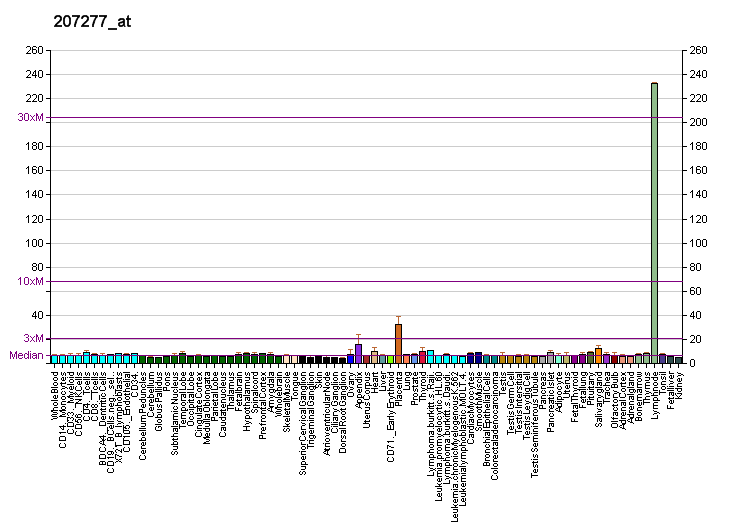

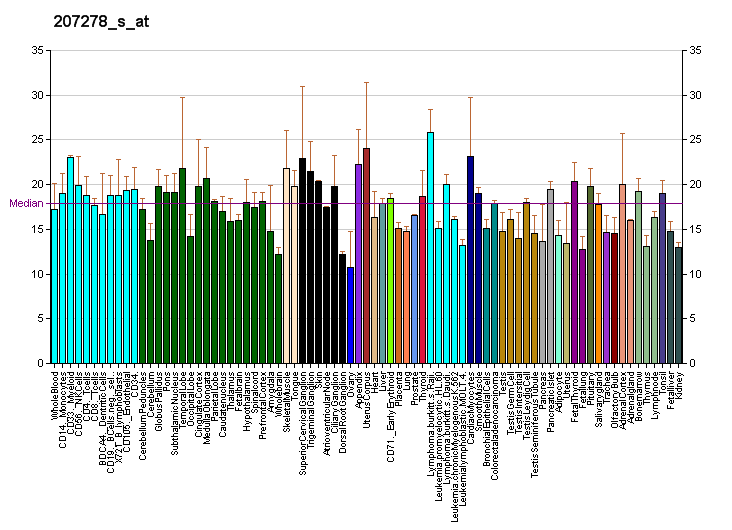
RNA expression pattern
Bgee	Human / Mouse (ortholog); Top expressed in: lymph node; superficial temporal artery; decidua; rectum; right coronary artery; mucosa of ileum; jejunal mucosa; gallbladder; apex of heart; duodenum / Top expressed in: morula; skin of abdomen; blastocyst; mesenteric lymph nodes; lip; skin of external ear; thymus; muscle of thigh; skin of back; white adipose tissue; More reference expression data
BioGPS	More reference expression data
Gene ontology
Molecular function	peptide antigen binding; virus receptor activity; metal ion binding; protein binding; mannose binding; virion binding; carbohydrate binding
Cellular component	cytoplasm; integral component of membrane; membrane; extracellular region; cell surface; extracellular exosome; external side of plasma membrane; host cell; plasma membrane
Biological process	leukocyte cell-cell adhesion; cell-cell recognition; intracellular transport of virus; regulation of T cell proliferation; heterophilic cell-cell adhesion via plasma membrane cell adhesion molecules; intracellular signal transduction; antigen processing and presentation; endocytosis; adaptive immune response; immune system process; viral genome replication; stimulatory C-type lectin receptor signaling pathway; peptide antigen transport; cell adhesion; modulation by virus of host process; viral entry into host cell; viral process; virion attachment to host cell; innate immune response; positive regulation of T cell proliferation; B cell adhesion
Sources:Amigo / QuickGO
Orthologs
Databases	NCBI: entry; OMA: entry
Species	Human	Mouse
Entrez	30835	170780
Ensembl	ENSG00000090659	ENSMUSG00000040197
UniProt	Q9NNX6	Q91ZW7
RefSeq (mRNA)	NM_001144893; NM_001144894; NM_001144895; NM_001144896; NM_001144897 NM_001144899; NM_021155	NM_130905
RefSeq (protein)	NP_001138365; NP_001138366; NP_001138367; NP_001138368; NP_001138369 NP_001138371; NP_066978	NP_570975
Location (UCSC)	Chr 19: 7.74 – 7.75 Mb	Chr 8: 3.9 – 3.9 Mb
PubMed search
- Wikidata
View/Edit Human	View/Edit Mouse

DC-SIGN (Dendritic Cell-Specific Intercellular adhesion molecule-3-Grabbing Non-integrin) also known as CD209 (Cluster of Differentiation 209) is a protein which in humans is encoded by the CD209 gene.

DC-SIGN is a C-type lectin receptor present on the surface of both macrophages and dendritic cells. DC-SIGN on macrophages recognises and binds with high affinity to high-mannose type N-glycans, a class of PAMPs (pathogen associated molecular patterns) commonly found on viruses, bacteria and fungi. This binding interaction activates phagocytosis. On myeloid and pre-plasmacytoid dendritic cells DC-SIGN mediates dendritic cell rolling interactions with blood endothelium and activation of CD4+ T cells, as well as recognition of pathogen haptens.

== Function ==
DC-SIGN is a C-type lectin and has a high affinity for the ICAM3 molecule. It binds various microorganisms by recognizing high-mannose-containing glycoproteins on their surface, and can function as a co-receptor for several viruses such as HIV and Hepatitis C. Binding to DC-SIGN can promote HIV and Hepatitis C virus to infect target cells (T-cells and hepatocytes, respectively).

Besides functioning as an adhesion molecule, recent studies have also shown that DC-SIGN can initiate innate immunity by modulating toll-like receptors, though the detailed mechanism is not yet known. DC-SIGN together with other C-type lectins is involved in recognition of tumors by dendritic cells. DC-SIGN is also a potential engineering target for dendritic cell based cancer vaccine.

== Clinical significance ==
=== HIV infection ===
This molecule is involved in the initial stages of the human immunodeficiency virus infection, as the HIV gp120 molecule causes co-internalization of the DC-SIGN molecule and HIV virus particle (virion). The dendritic cell then migrates to the cognate lymphoid organ, whereupon recycling of the DC-SIGN/HIV virion complex to the cell periphery facilitates HIV infection of CD4^{+} T cells by interaction between DC-SIGN and ICAM-3.

=== Ebola infection ===
Different studies have demonstrated that the ebola virus infection process starts when the virus reaches the cellular DC-SIGN receptor to infect the dendritic cells (of the immune system). In 2015 European researchers designed a "giant" molecule formed by thirteen fullerenes covered by carbohydrates which, by blocking DC-SIGN receptor, are able to inhibit the cell infection by an artificial ebola virus model. These antiviral molecules decorated with specific carbohydrates (sugars) present affinity by the receptor used as an entry point to infect the cell and act blocking it, thus inhibiting the infection in a sub-nanomolar range.

=== SARS-CoV-2 ===
Similarly to HIV-1 gp120 binding, both DC-SIGN and its homologue L-SIGN (CD209L or CD299) have also been identified as receptors facilitating the entry of Severe acute respiratory syndrome coronavirus 2 (SARS-CoV-2) into human cells. Significant CD209L expression has been revealed in lung and kidney epithelia and endothelia and interactions with SARS-CoV-2 Spike protein (S protein) have been demonstrated in vitro. CD209L also exhibits interaction with Angiotensin-converting enzyme-2 (ACE2), suggesting a potential role for CD209L-ACE2 heterodimerization in SARS-CoV-2 entry and infection in cell types expressing both proteins. It is shown that DC/L-SIGN can enhance viral infection and dissemination by contributing to additional routes of infection mediated by the S protein in a process called trans-infection. This process seems to be exclusive for DC/L-SIGN interaction. This complexity in the recognition patterns and functions of these C-lectin receptors is similar to what has been described for other viruses (like HIV and Ebola virus) and thus both DC/L-SIGN are considered as pattern recognition receptors (PRR).

== Gene family ==
DC-SIGN/CD209 is an animal "C-lectin", a large and diverse family of proteins found in both prokaryotes and eukaryotes most of which are functional lectins, meaning they bind carbohydrate ligands, and whose ligand-binding affinity requires calcium (hence "C-lectin"). Among the animal C-lectins, a subfamily known as the ASGR (asialoglycoprotein receptors) group contains several sub-sub-families, many of which are important to innate immunity.

A cluster of genes in both humans and mice contains three related members of the "DC Receptor" class, so named because of their homology to DC-SIGN. Of these, CD23 is, however, not expressed on dendritic cells but is a characteristic surface molecule of B lymphocytes, and LSectin (CLEC4G) is expressed on the sinusoidal endothelium of the liver. The third gene group consists of multiple paralogues of CD209. Thus, both primates and mice have multiple paralogues of CD209 more closely related to each other within the species than to their orthologous counterparts in the other species. Higher primates have at least three DC-SIGN genes, DC-SIGN, DC-SIGNL1 (also known as DC-SIGNR or L-SIGN) and DC-SIGNL2, although not all three are present in every species; DC-SIGNL2 has not been detected in humans. Eight paralogous of DC-SIGN have been reported in the laboratory mouse strain C57BL/6; these go by the names DC-SIGN, DC-SIGNR2...DC-SIGNR8. DC-SIGNR6 is a pseudogene. The genes labeled "DC-SIGN" in the human and mouse are thus not unique orthologues, although they resemble each other functionally and by being expressed on dendritic cells. Other members of the mouse CD209 gene group are differentially expressed on different cell types. For example, DC-SIGNR1 is expressed largely on macrophages in the marginal zones of the spleen and in the medulla of lymph nodes.
