= Electroneutral sodium bicarbonate exchanger 1 =

Protein-coding gene in the species Homo sapiens

SLC4A8
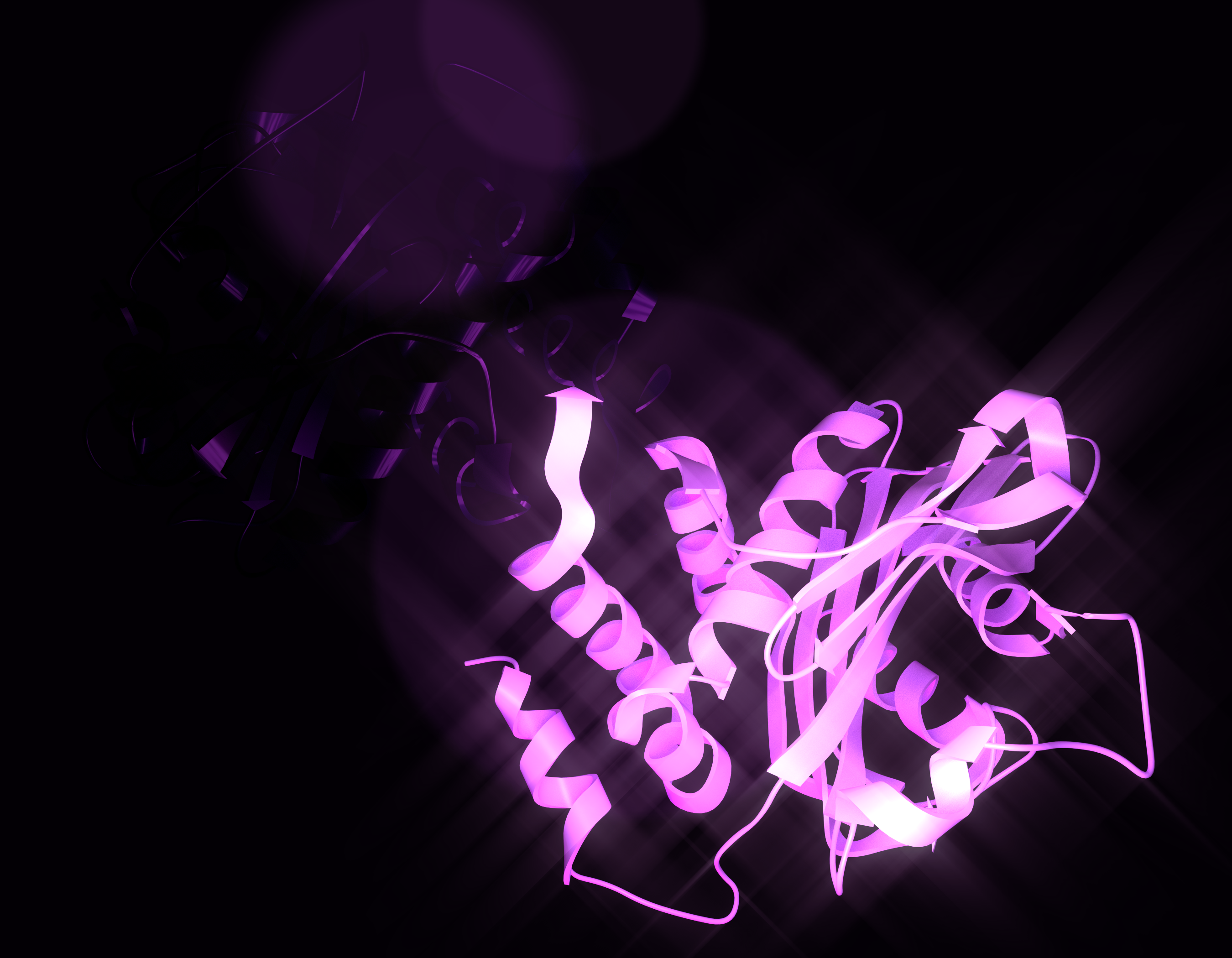

Identifiers
- Aliases: SLC4A8, NBC3, NDCBE, solute carrier family 4 member 8
- External IDs: OMIM: 605024; MGI: 1928745; GeneCards: SLC4A8

Gene location (Human)
Chr.	Chromosome 12 (human)
Band	12q13.13	Start	51,391,317 bp
Band	12q13.13	End	51,515,763 bp

Gene location (Mouse)
Chr.	Chromosome 15 (mouse)
Band	15|15 F1	Start	100,659,628 bp
Band	15|15 F1	End	100,721,849 bp
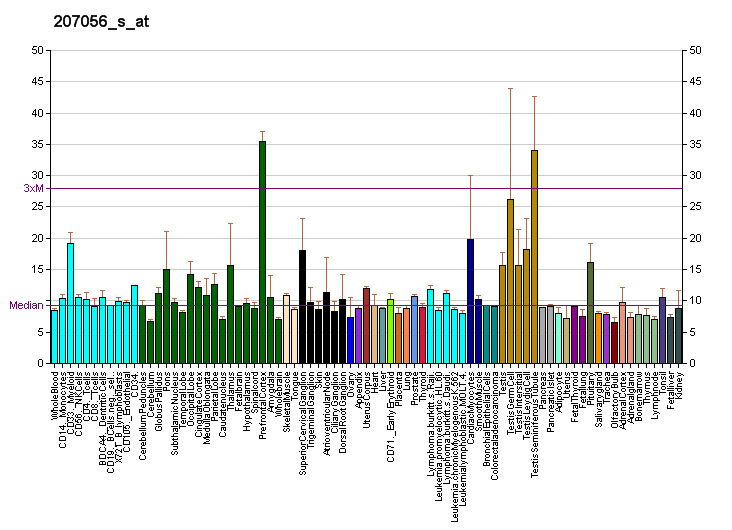
RNA expression pattern
Bgee	Human / Mouse (ortholog); Top expressed in: pons; Brodmann area 23; superior vestibular nucleus; corpus callosum; middle temporal gyrus; ventral tegmental area; postcentral gyrus; inferior ganglion of vagus nerve; lateral nuclear group of thalamus; cerebellar vermis / Top expressed in: spermatocyte; spermatid; zygote; neural layer of retina; secondary oocyte; lumbar subsegment of spinal cord; superior frontal gyrus; dentate gyrus of hippocampal formation granule cell; primary oocyte; cerebellar cortex; More reference expression data
BioGPS	More reference expression data
Gene ontology
Molecular function	antiporter activity; inorganic anion exchanger activity; anion transmembrane transporter activity; sodium:bicarbonate symporter activity
Cellular component	integral component of membrane; neuronal cell body membrane; neuron projection; plasma membrane; membrane; integral component of plasma membrane
Biological process	anion transport; sodium ion transport; regulation of intracellular pH; inorganic anion transport; ion transport; bicarbonate transport; transmembrane transport; anion transmembrane transport
Sources:Amigo / QuickGO
Orthologs
Databases	NCBI: entry; OMA: entry
Species	Human	Mouse
Entrez	9498	59033
Ensembl	ENSG00000050438	ENSMUSG00000023032
UniProt	Q2Y0W8	Q8JZR6
RefSeq (mRNA)	NM_001039960; NM_001258401; NM_001258402; NM_001258403; NM_001267615 NM_004858; NM_001405266; NM_001405268; NM_001405270	NM_001033218; NM_021530; NM_001347102
RefSeq (protein)	NP_001035049; NP_001245330; NP_001245331; NP_001245332; NP_001254544	NP_001334031; NP_067505
Location (UCSC)	Chr 12: 51.39 – 51.52 Mb	Chr 15: 100.66 – 100.72 Mb
PubMed search
- Wikidata
View/Edit Human	View/Edit Mouse

Electroneutral sodium bicarbonate exchanger 1 is a protein that in humans is encoded by the SLC4A8 gene.

== See also ==
- Solute carrier family
- cotransporter

== Interactions ==
SLC4A8 has been shown to interact with Sodium-hydrogen antiporter 3 regulator 1 and Cystic fibrosis transmembrane conductance regulator.
