= FERM domain =

FERM N-terminal domain
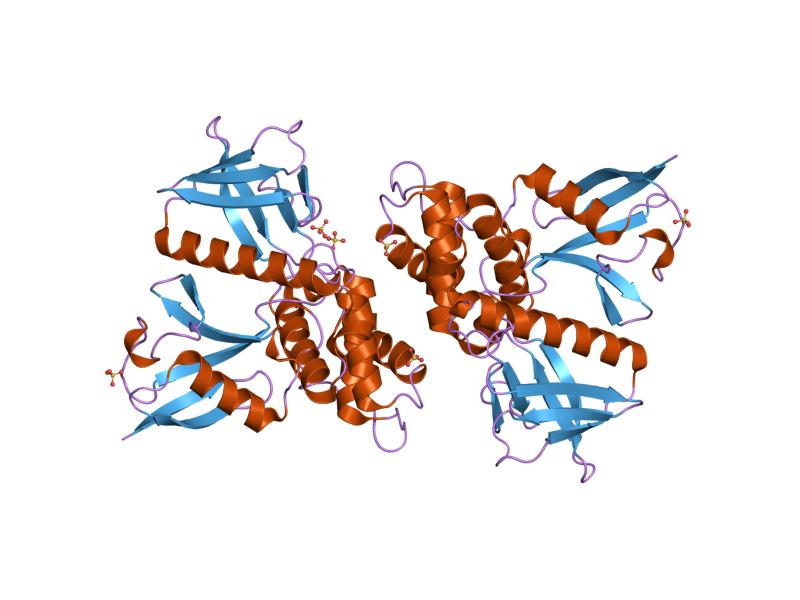
- crystal structure of the ferm domain of merlin, the neurofibromatosis 2 tumor suppressor protein.

Identifiers
- Symbol: FERM_N
- Pfam: PF09379
- Pfam clan: CL0072
- InterPro: IPR018979
- SCOP2: 1gc7 / SCOPe / SUPFAM
- OPM superfamily: 49
- OPM protein: 1gc6
- Membranome: 161
Available protein structures:
- PDB: IPR018979 PF09379 (ECOD; PDBsum)
- AlphaFold: IPR018979; PF09379

FERM central domain
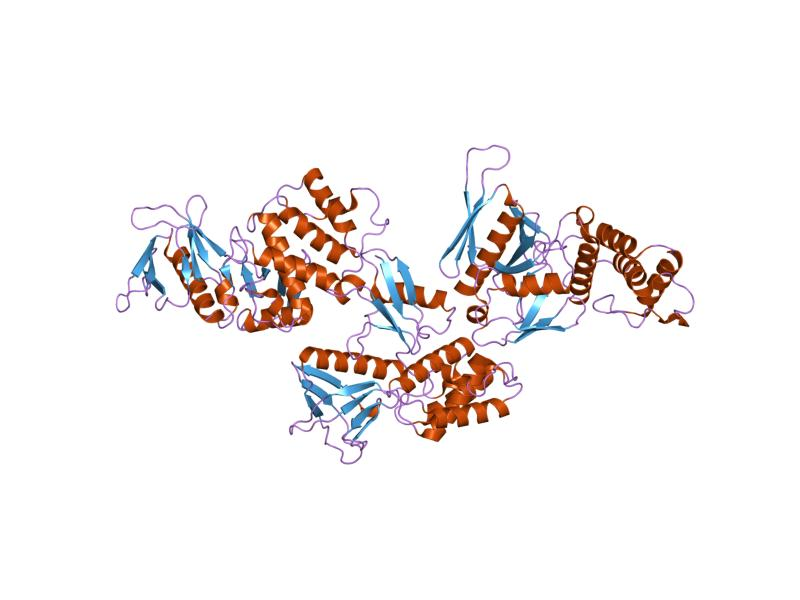
- crystal structure of the protein 4.1r membrane binding domain

Identifiers
- Symbol: FERM_M
- Pfam: PF00373
- InterPro: IPR019748
- SCOP2: 1gc7 / SCOPe / SUPFAM
- CDD: cd14473
Available protein structures:
- PDB: IPR019748 PF00373 (ECOD; PDBsum)
- AlphaFold: IPR019748; PF00373

FERM C-terminal PH-like domain
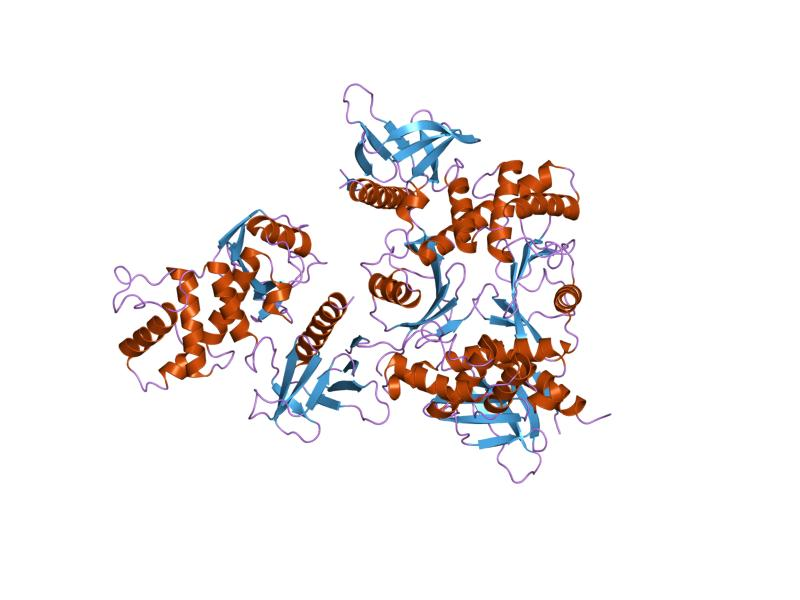
- crystal structure of the radixin ferm domain complexed with the nep cytoplasmic tail

Identifiers
- Symbol: FERM_C
- Pfam: PF09380
- Pfam clan: CL0266
- InterPro: IPR018980
- SCOP2: 1ef1 / SCOPe / SUPFAM
- CDD: cd00836
Available protein structures:
- PDB: IPR018980 PF09380 (ECOD; PDBsum)
- AlphaFold: IPR018980; PF09380

In molecular biology, the FERM domain (F for 4.1 protein, E for ezrin, R for radixin and M for moesin) is a widespread protein module involved in localising proteins to the plasma membrane. FERM domains are found in a number of cytoskeletal-associated proteins that associate with various proteins at the interface between the plasma membrane and the cytoskeleton. The FERM domain is located at the N terminus in the majority of proteins in which it is found.

== Structure and function ==
Ezrin, moesin, and radixin are highly related proteins (ERM protein family), but the other proteins in which the FERM domain is found do not share any region of similarity outside of this domain. ERM proteins are made of three domains, the FERM domain, a central helical domain and a C-terminal tail domain, which binds F-actin. The amino-acid sequence of the FERM domain is highly conserved among ERM proteins and is responsible for membrane association by direct binding to the cytoplasmic domain or tail of integral membrane proteins. ERM proteins are regulated by an intramolecular association of the FERM and C-terminal tail domains that masks their binding sites for other molecules. For cytoskeleton-membrane cross-linking, the dormant molecules becomes activated and the FERM domain attaches to the membrane by binding specific membrane proteins, while the last 34 residues of the tail bind actin filaments. Aside from binding to membranes, the activated FERM domain of ERM proteins can also bind the guanine nucleotide dissociation inhibitor of Rho GTPase (RhoGDI), which suggests that in addition to functioning as a cross-linker, ERM proteins may influence Rho signalling pathways. The crystal structure of the FERM domain reveals that it is composed of three structural modules (F1, F2, and F3) that together form a compact clover-shaped structure. The N-terminal module is ubiquitin-like. The C-terminal module is a PH-like domain.

The FERM domain has also been called the amino-terminal domain, the 30kDa domain, 4.1N30, the membrane-cytoskeletal-linking domain, the ERM-like domain, the ezrin-like domain of the band 4.1 superfamily, the conserved N-terminal region, and the membrane attachment domain.

== Examples ==
FERM domain containing proteins include:

- Band 4.1, which links the spectrin-actin cytoskeleton of erythrocytes to the plasma membrane.
- Ezrin, a component of the undercoat of the microvilli plasma membrane.
- Moesin, which is probably involved in binding major cytoskeletal structures to the plasma membrane.
- Radixin, which is involved in the binding of the barbed end of actin filaments to the plasma membrane in the undercoat of the cell-to-cell Adherens junction.
- Talin, a cytoskeletal protein concentrated in regions of cell-substratum contact and, in lymphocytes, of cell-cell contacts.
- Filopodin, a slime mould protein that binds actin and which is involved in the control of cell motility and chemotaxis.
- Merlin (or schwannomin).
- Protein NBL4.
- Unconventional myosins X, VIIa and XV, which are mutated in congenital deafness.
- Focal-adhesion kinases (FAKs), cytoplasmic protein tyrosine kinases involved in signalling through integrins.
- Janus tyrosine kinases (JAKs), cytoplasmic tyrosine kinases that are non-covalently associated with the cytoplasmic tails of receptors for cytokines or polypeptidic hormones.
- Non-receptor tyrosine-protein kinase TYK2.
- Protein-tyrosine phosphatases PTPN3 and PTPN4, enzymes that appear to act at junctions between the membrane and the cytoskeleton.
- Protein-tyrosine phosphatases PTPN14 and PTP-D1, PTP-RL10 and PTP2E.
- Caenorhabditis elegans protein phosphatase ptp-1.
