= Ezrin =

Protein-coding gene in the species Homo sapiens

EZR
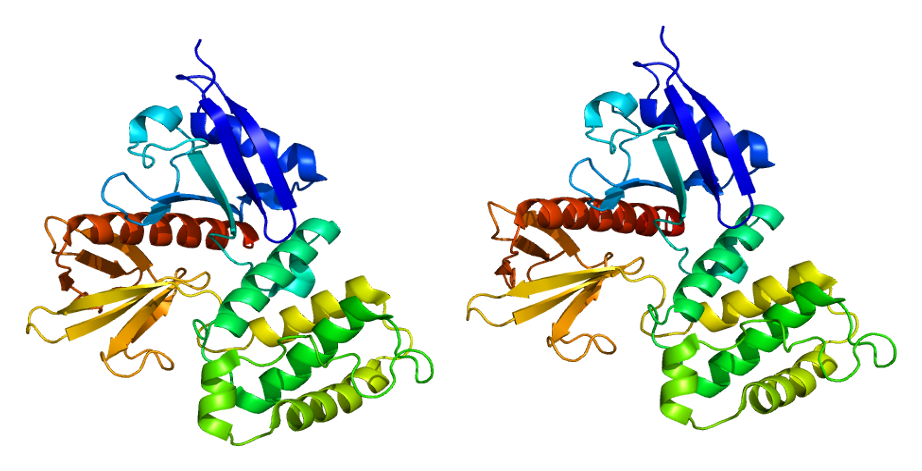

Identifiers
- Aliases: EZR, CVIL, CVL, HEL-S-105, VIL2, Ezrin
- External IDs: OMIM: 123900; MGI: 98931; GeneCards: EZR
Available structures
PDB	Ortholog search: PDBe RCSB
PDB	List of PDB id codes 4RM8, 4RMA, 4RM9, 1NI2

Gene location (Human)
Chr.	Chromosome 6 (human)
Band	6q25.3	Start	158,765,741 bp
Band	6q25.3	End	158,819,368 bp

Gene location (Mouse)
Chr.	Chromosome 17 (mouse)
Band	17|17 A1	Start	7,005,440 bp
Band	17|17 A1	End	7,050,183 bp
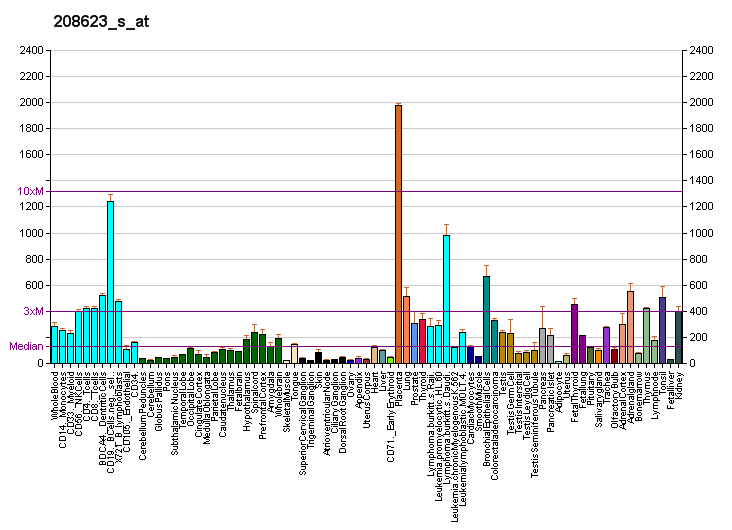

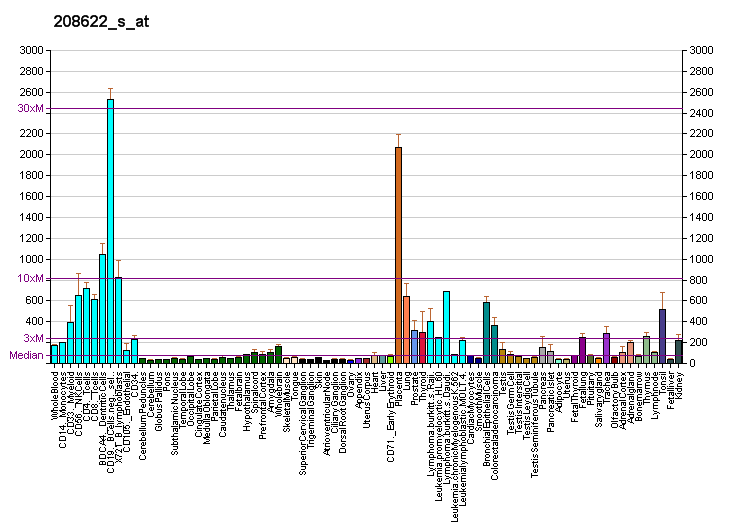

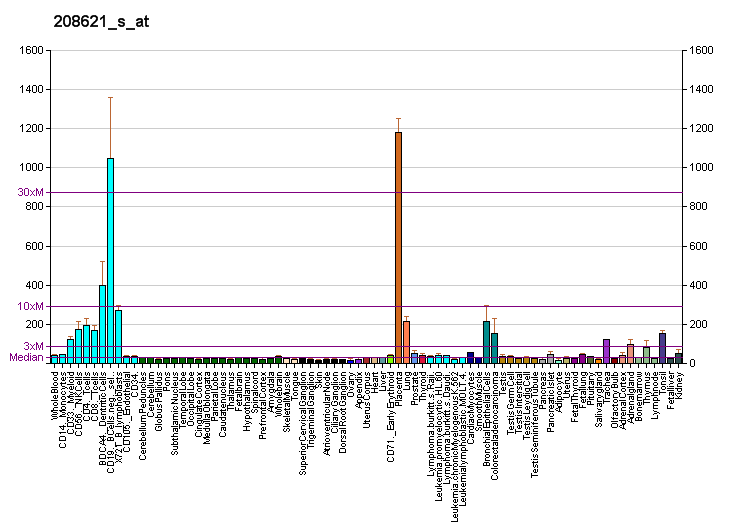
RNA expression pattern
Bgee	Human / Mouse (ortholog); Top expressed in: ventricular zone; bronchial epithelial cell; ganglionic eminence; nasal epithelium; olfactory zone of nasal mucosa; mucosa of paranasal sinus; tendon of biceps brachii; right adrenal cortex; right uterine tube; jejunal mucosa / Top expressed in: epithelium of stomach; mucous cell of stomach; left colon; epithelium of small intestine; intestinal villus; ileum; seminal vesicula; Ileal epithelium; pyloric antrum; Epithelium of choroid plexus; More reference expression data
BioGPS	More reference expression data
Gene ontology
Molecular function	protein domain specific binding; protein-containing complex binding; cytoskeletal protein binding; protein kinase A regulatory subunit binding; protein kinase A catalytic subunit binding; S100 protein binding; actin filament binding; protein binding; cell adhesion molecule binding; microtubule binding; ATPase binding; actin binding; RNA binding; cadherin binding; protein C-terminus binding; disordered domain specific binding; protein kinase A binding; identical protein binding
Cellular component	cytoplasm; cytosol; endosome; membrane; focal adhesion; T-tubule; ruffle; Schwann cell microvillus; ruffle membrane; actin cytoskeleton; perinuclear region of cytoplasm; cytoskeleton; cell projection; cytoplasmic side of apical plasma membrane; myelin sheath; microvillus; microspike; apical plasma membrane; membrane raft; extracellular exosome; microvillus membrane; ciliary basal body; filopodium; cortical cytoskeleton; plasma membrane; apical part of cell; astrocyte projection; intracellular anatomical structure; cell cortex; brush border; actin filament; TCR signalosome; cell periphery; cell body; vesicle; plasma membrane raft; uropod; basolateral plasma membrane; immunological synapse; cell tip; fibrillar center; extracellular space; extrinsic component of membrane; protein-containing complex
Biological process	leukocyte cell-cell adhesion; regulation of organelle assembly; sphingosine-1-phosphate receptor signaling pathway; negative regulation of p38MAPK cascade; actin filament bundle assembly; establishment of epithelial cell apical/basal polarity; positive regulation of multicellular organism growth; astral microtubule organization; cellular response to cAMP; establishment of endothelial barrier; microvillus assembly; negative regulation of T cell receptor signaling pathway; gland morphogenesis; cortical microtubule organization; positive regulation of protein localization to early endosome; positive regulation of early endosome to late endosome transport; intestinal D-glucose absorption; establishment or maintenance of apical/basal cell polarity; regulation of NIK/NF-kappaB signaling; epithelial cell differentiation; regulation of actin cytoskeleton organization; negative regulation of transcription by RNA polymerase II; positive regulation of protein secretion; membrane to membrane docking; regulation of cell shape; protein kinase A signaling; establishment of centrosome localization; phosphatidylinositol-mediated signaling; regulation of cell size; actin cytoskeleton reorganization; filopodium assembly; receptor internalization; terminal web assembly; axon guidance; positive regulation of gene expression; negative regulation of ERK1 and ERK2 cascade; protein localization to cell cortex; regulation of microvillus length; protein localization to plasma membrane; positive regulation of protein localization to plasma membrane
Sources:Amigo / QuickGO
Orthologs
Databases	NCBI: entry; OMA: entry
Species	Human	Mouse
Entrez	7430	22350
Ensembl	ENSG00000092820	ENSMUSG00000052397
UniProt	P15311	P26040
RefSeq (mRNA)	NM_001111077; NM_003379	NM_009510
RefSeq (protein)	NP_001104547; NP_003370	NP_033536
Location (UCSC)	Chr 6: 158.77 – 158.82 Mb	Chr 17: 7.01 – 7.05 Mb
PubMed search
- Wikidata
View/Edit Human	View/Edit Mouse

villin 2 (ezrin)

Identifiers
- Symbol: VIL2
- NCBI gene: 7430
- HGNC: 12691
- OMIM: 123900
- RefSeq: NM_003379
- UniProt: P15311

Other data
- Locus: Chr. 6 q22-q27
Search for
- Structures: Swiss-model
- Domains: InterPro

Ezrin, also known as cytovillin or villin-2, is a protein that in humans is encoded by the EZR gene.

== Structure ==
The N-terminus of ezrin contains a FERM domain which is further subdivided into three subdomains. The C-terminus contains an ERM domain.

== Function ==
The cytoplasmic peripheral protein encoded by this gene can be phosphorylated by protein-tyrosine kinase in microvilli and is a member of the ERM protein family. This protein serves as a linker between plasma membrane and actin cytoskeleton. It plays a key role in cell surface structure adhesion, migration, and organization.

The N-terminus domain (also called FERM domain) binds sodium-hydrogen exchanger regulatory factor (NHERF) protein (involving long-range allostery). This binding can happen only when ezrin is in its active state. The activation of ezrin occurs in synergism of the two factors: binding of the N-terminus domain to phosphatidylinositol 4,5-bisphosphate (PIP_{2}) and phosphorylation of threonine T567 in the C-terminus domain. Binding to actin filaments (via C-terminus) and to membrane proteins (via N-terminus) stabilizes the protein's conformation in its active mode. The membrane proteins like CD44 and ICAM-2 are indirect binding partners of ezrin, while EBP50 (ERM binding protein 50) can associate with ezrin directly.

== Interactions ==
VIL2 has been shown to interact with:

- CD43,
- FASLG,
- ICAM-1,
- ICAM2,
- ICAM3,
- Merlin,
- MSN,
- PIK3R1,
- PALLD
- S100P,
- SDC2,
- SLC9A3R1,
- SLC9A3R2, and
- VCAM-1.
