= Moesin =

Protein-coding gene in the species Homo sapiens

MSN
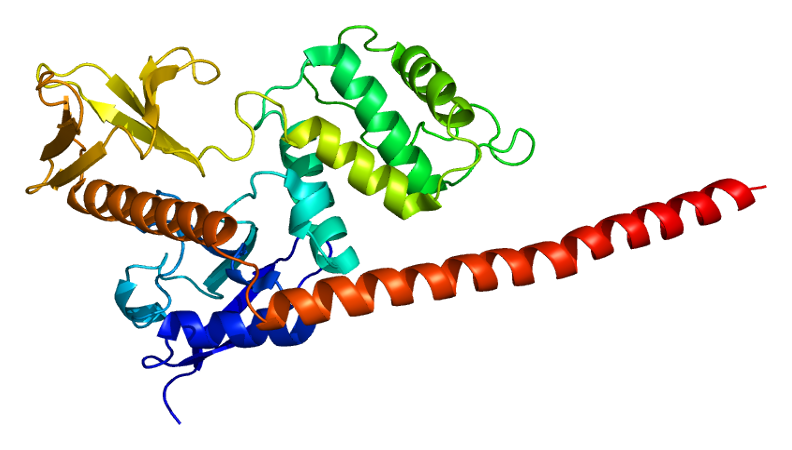

Identifiers
- Aliases: MSN, HEL70, moesin, IMD50
- External IDs: OMIM: 309845; MGI: 97167; GeneCards: MSN
Available structures
PDB	Ortholog search: PDBe RCSB
PDB	List of PDB id codes 1E5W, 1EF1, 1SGH

Gene location (Human)
Chr.	X chromosome (human)
Band	Xq12	Start	65,588,377 bp
Band	Xq12	End	65,741,931 bp

Gene location (Mouse)
Chr.	X chromosome (mouse)
Band	X|X C3	Start	95,139,648 bp
Band	X|X C3	End	95,212,158 bp
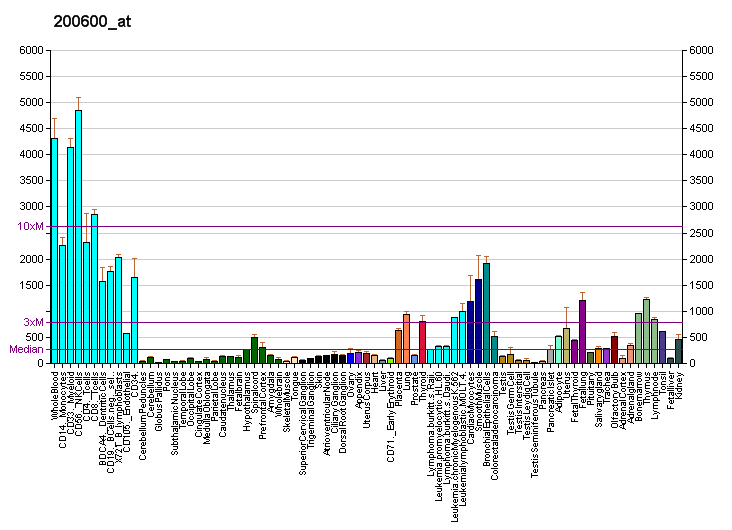
RNA expression pattern
Bgee	Human / Mouse (ortholog); Top expressed in: lower lobe of lung; white blood cell; monocyte; granulocyte; synovial joint; saphenous vein; synovial membrane; right lung; appendix; smooth muscle tissue / Top expressed in: right lung; right lung lobe; left lung; endothelial cell of lymphatic vessel; left lung lobe; granulocyte; mesenteric lymph nodes; stroma of bone marrow; ascending aorta; tibiofemoral joint; More reference expression data
BioGPS	More reference expression data
Gene ontology
Molecular function	cytoskeletal protein binding; structural constituent of cytoskeleton; protein binding; actin binding; double-stranded RNA binding; signaling receptor binding; protein kinase binding; cell adhesion molecule binding; enzyme binding
Cellular component	cytoplasm; vesicle; cell projection; pseudopodium; blood microparticle; membrane; focal adhesion; filopodium; myelin sheath; plasma membrane; apical part of cell; microvillus; uropod; basolateral plasma membrane; apical plasma membrane; perinuclear region of cytoplasm; extracellular exosome; cytoskeleton; microvillus membrane; nucleus; cell periphery; extracellular space; cell surface; cytosol
Biological process	leukocyte cell-cell adhesion; regulation of cell size; establishment of endothelial barrier; regulation of organelle assembly; cellular response to testosterone stimulus; regulation of lymphocyte migration; positive regulation of podosome assembly; gland morphogenesis; positive regulation of gene expression; establishment of epithelial cell apical/basal polarity; regulation of cell shape; membrane to membrane docking; positive regulation of protein localization to early endosome; positive regulation of early endosome to late endosome transport; leukocyte migration; cytoskeleton organization; immunological synapse formation; T cell proliferation; T cell aggregation; T cell migration; interleukin-12-mediated signaling pathway; viral process
Sources:Amigo / QuickGO
Orthologs
Databases	NCBI: entry; OMA: entry
Species	Human	Mouse
Entrez	4478	17698
Ensembl	ENSG00000147065	ENSMUSG00000031207
UniProt	P26038	P26041
RefSeq (mRNA)	NM_002444	NM_010833
RefSeq (protein)	NP_002435	NP_034963
Location (UCSC)	Chr X: 65.59 – 65.74 Mb	Chr X: 95.14 – 95.21 Mb
PubMed search
- Wikidata
View/Edit Human	View/Edit Mouse

Moesin is a protein that in humans is encoded by the MSN gene.

Moesin (for membrane-organizing extension spike protein) is a member of the ERM protein family which includes ezrin and radixin. ERM proteins appear to function as cross-linkers between plasma membranes and actin-based cytoskeletons.

Moesin is localized to filopodia and other membranous protrusions that are important for cell–cell recognition and signaling and for cell movement.

Moesin has FERM domain at N-terminal.

== Interactions ==
Moesin has been shown to interact with:

- CD43
- ICAM3
- Neutrophil cytosolic factor 1,
- Neutrophil cytosolic factor 4
- VCAM-1
- EZR
