= Radixin =

Protein-coding gene in the species Homo sapiens

RDX
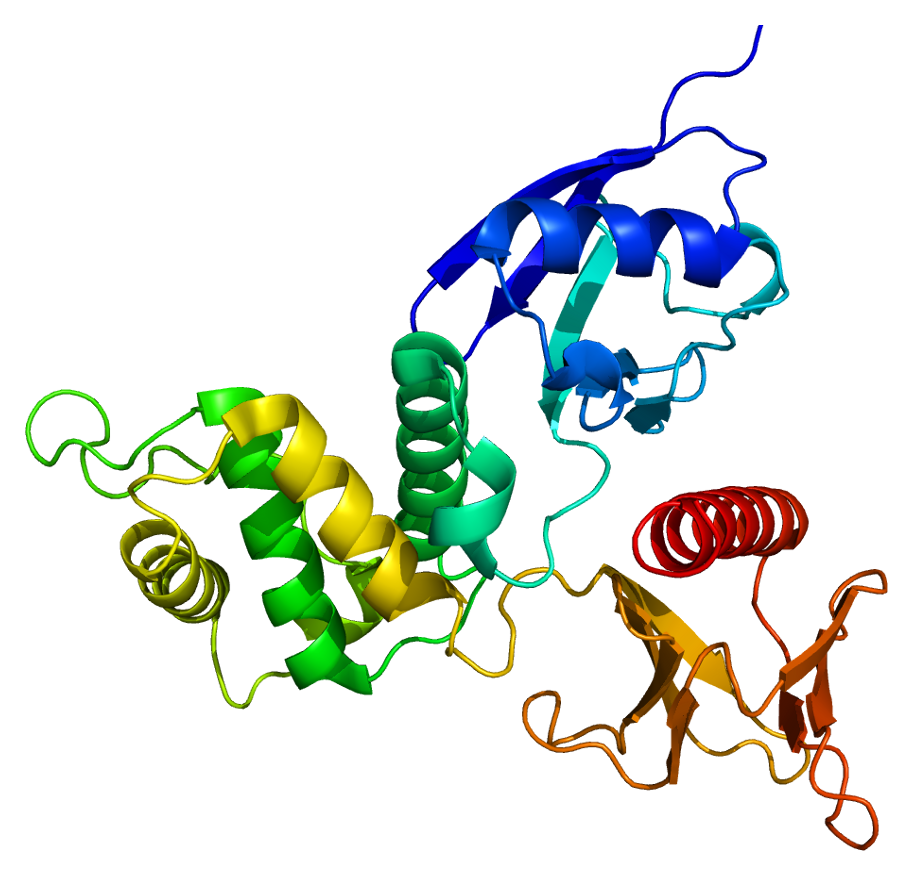

Identifiers
- Aliases: RDX, DFNB24, radixin
- External IDs: OMIM: 179410; MGI: 97887; GeneCards: RDX
Available structures
PDB	Ortholog search: PDBe RCSB
PDB	List of PDB id codes 1GC6, 1GC7, 1J19, 2D10, 2D11, 2D2Q, 2EMS, 2EMT, 2YVC, 2ZPY

Gene location (Human)
Chr.	Chromosome 11 (human)
Band	11q22.3	Start	109,864,295 bp
Band	11q22.3	End	110,296,712 bp

Gene location (Mouse)
Chr.	Chromosome 9 (mouse)
Band	9|9 A5.3	Start	51,958,473 bp
Band	9|9 A5.3	End	52,011,763 bp
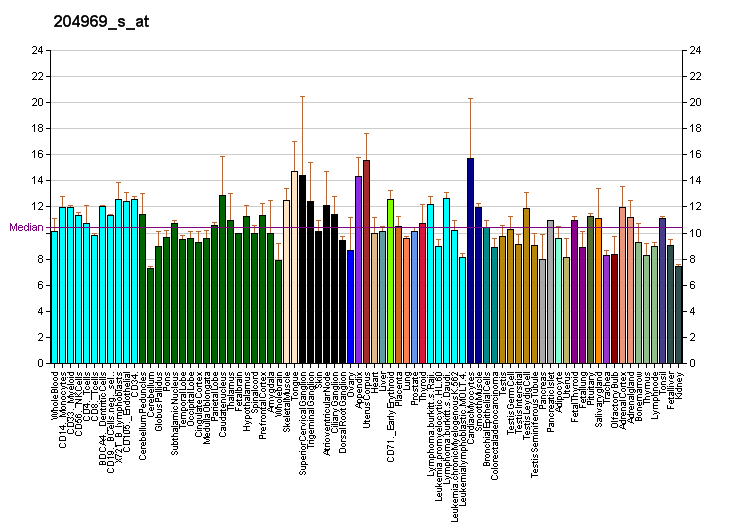

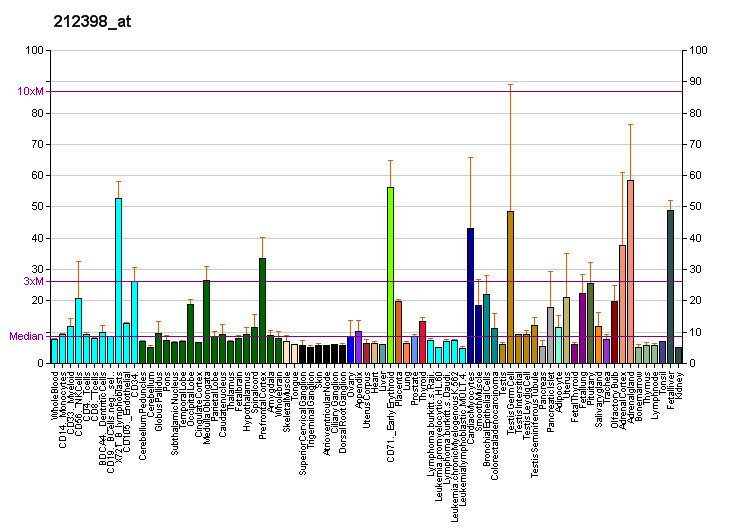

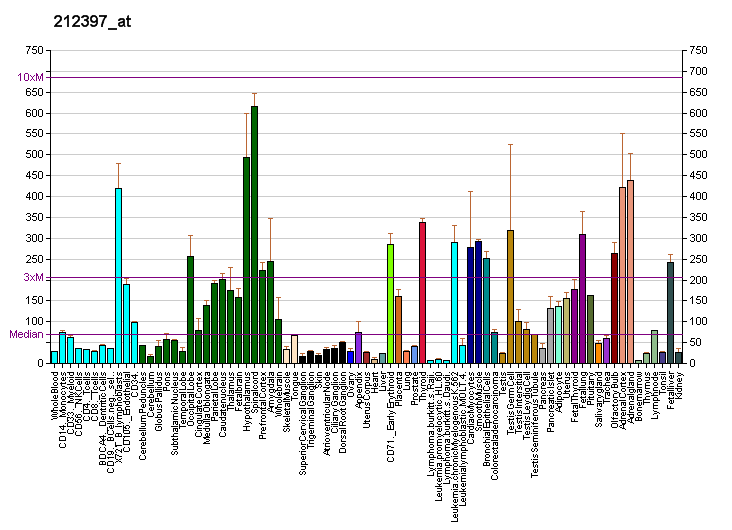
RNA expression pattern
Bgee	Human / Mouse (ortholog); Top expressed in: right adrenal cortex; visceral pleura; parietal pleura; left adrenal gland; left adrenal cortex; ventricular zone; corpus callosum; secondary oocyte; tibia; Achilles tendon / Top expressed in: primary oocyte; secondary oocyte; Gonadal ridge; cumulus cell; zygote; dermis; atrium; lacrimal gland; abdominal wall; pineal gland; More reference expression data
BioGPS	More reference expression data
Gene ontology
Molecular function	protein homodimerization activity; protein domain specific binding; ATPase binding; protein kinase A binding; cytoskeletal protein binding; protein binding; actin binding; RNA binding; cadherin binding
Cellular component	cytoplasm; membrane; focal adhesion; filopodium; ruffle; myelin sheath; plasma membrane; apical part of cell; stereocilium; microvillus; apical plasma membrane; cortical actin cytoskeleton; cleavage furrow; extracellular exosome; cytoskeleton; cell periphery; lamellipodium; midbody; T-tubule; cell tip; extracellular space; cell projection
Biological process	regulation of cell size; establishment of endothelial barrier; microvillus assembly; regulation of organelle assembly; establishment of protein localization; positive regulation of cell migration; regulation of GTPase activity; positive regulation of G1/S transition of mitotic cell cycle; negative regulation of homotypic cell-cell adhesion; regulation of actin filament bundle assembly; positive regulation of gene expression; negative regulation of GTPase activity; negative regulation of adherens junction organization; apical protein localization; actin filament capping; cellular response to thyroid hormone stimulus; regulation of cell shape; protein kinase A signaling; regulation of ruffle assembly; positive regulation of protein localization to early endosome; positive regulation of early endosome to late endosome transport; negative regulation of cell size; regulation of Rap protein signal transduction; cellular response to platelet-derived growth factor stimulus; barbed-end actin filament capping; protein localization to plasma membrane
Sources:Amigo / QuickGO
Orthologs
Databases	NCBI: entry; OMA: entry
Species	Human	Mouse
Entrez	5962	19684
Ensembl	ENSG00000137710	ENSMUSG00000032050
UniProt	P35241	P26043
RefSeq (mRNA)	NM_002906; NM_001260492; NM_001260493; NM_001260494; NM_001260495 NM_001260496	NM_001104616; NM_001104617; NM_009041
RefSeq (protein)	NP_001247421; NP_001247422; NP_001247423; NP_001247424; NP_001247425 NP_002897	NP_001098086; NP_001098087; NP_033067
Location (UCSC)	Chr 11: 109.86 – 110.3 Mb	Chr 9: 51.96 – 52.01 Mb
PubMed search
- Wikidata
View/Edit Human	View/Edit Mouse

Radixin is a protein that in humans is encoded by the RDX gene.

Radixin is a cytoskeletal protein that may be important in linking actin to the plasma membrane. It is highly similar in sequence to both ezrin and moesin. The radixin gene has been localized by fluorescence in situ hybridization to 11q23. A truncated version representing a pseudogene (RDXP2) was assigned to Xp21.3. Another pseudogene that seemed to lack introns (RDXP1) was mapped to 11p by Southern and PCR analyses.

== Interactions ==
Radixin has been shown to interact with GNA13.

== See also ==
- ERM protein family
