= ERM protein family =

Protein family

Ezrin/radixin/moesin family
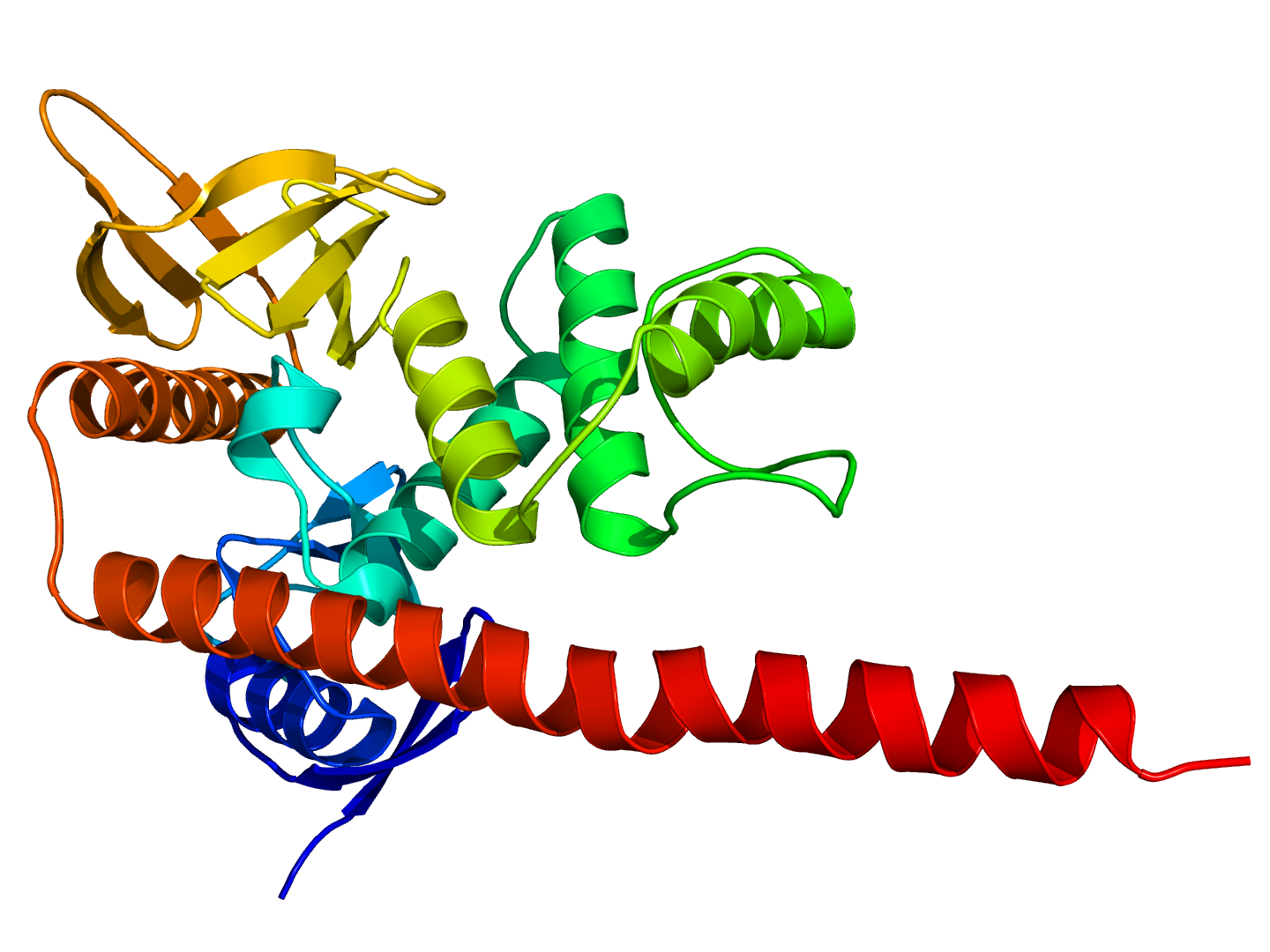
- Crystallographic structure of the N-terminal domain of moesin.

Identifiers
- Symbol: ERM
- Pfam: PF00769
- InterPro: IPR011259
- SCOP2: 1ef1 / SCOPe / SUPFAM
Available protein structures:
- PDB: 1ef1, 1e5w, 1sgh IPR011259 PF00769 (ECOD; PDBsum)
- AlphaFold: IPR011259; PF00769

The ERM protein family consists of three closely related proteins, ezrin, radixin and moesin. The three paralogs, ezrin, radixin and moesin, are present in vertebrates, whereas other species have only one ERM gene. Therefore, in vertebrates these paralogs likely arose by gene duplication.

ERM proteins are highly conserved throughout evolution. More than 75% identity is observed in the N-terminal and the C-terminal of vertebrates (ezrin, radixin, moesin), Drosophila (dmoesin) and C. elegans (ERM-1) homologs.

== Structure ==
ERM molecules contain the following three domains:

- N-terminal globular domain, also called FERM domain (Band 4.1, ezrin, radixin, moesin). The FERM domain allows ERM proteins to interact with integral proteins of the plasma membrane, or scaffolding proteins localized beneath the plasma membrane. The FERM domain is composed of three subdomains (F1, F2, F3) that are arranged as a cloverleaf.
- extended alpha-helical domain.
- charged C-terminal domain. This domain mediates the interaction with F-actin.

Ezrin, radixin and moesin also contain a polyproline region between the central helical and C-terminal domains.

== Function ==
ERM proteins crosslink actin filaments with plasma membranes. They co-localize with CD44 at actin filament-plasma membrane interaction sites, associating with CD44 via their N-terminal domains and with actin filaments via their C-terminal domains.

The ERM protein moesin directly binds to microtubules via its N-terminal FERM domain in vitro and stabilizes microtubules at the cell cortex in vivo. This interaction is required for specific ERM-dependent functions in mitosis.

== Activation ==
ERM proteins are highly regulated proteins. They exist in two forms:

- the FERM domain is able to interact with the F-actin binding site and this head-to-tail interaction maintains ERM proteins into a folded form; in this state, ERM proteins are inactive for the folding prevents either integral protein binding, or actin-binding.
- if this head-to-tail interaction is disrupted, ERM proteins unfold, leading to an open and active conformation.

In culture cells, ERM proteins mainly exhibit the folded conformation (about 80-85%).

The current model for ERM protein activation is a two-step mechanism:

- First, phosphatidylinositol 4,5-bisphosphate interaction at the plasma membrane induces a pre-opening of the ERM molecule.
- Then, a not yet identified kinase phosphorylates a threonine localized in a highly conserved region of the C-terminal domain. The phosphate will stabilize the opening of the molecule.
