= Erlizumab =

Monoclonal antibody

Monoclonal antibody
- Type: F(ab')_{2} fragment
- Source: Humanized (from mouse)
- Target: CD18

Clinical data
- ATC code: none

Identifiers
- CAS Number: 211323-03-4
- ChemSpider: none
- UNII: X77RS4CMJF
- KEGG: D04045

Erlizumab, also known as rhuMAb, is a recombinant humanized monoclonal antibody that was an experimental immunosuppressive drug. Erlizumab was developed by Genentech under a partnership with Roche to treat heart attack, stroke, and traumatic shock.

== Mechanism of action ==
The drug works by blocking a growth factor in blood vessels. Specifically, erlizumab targets CD18 and an LFA-1 integrin. Erlizumab was meant to stop lymphocyte movement into inflamed tissue, thereby reducing tissue damage.

== Clinical trials ==
Genentech started clinical trials on the drug in October 1996. During clinical trials, six patients suddenly started coughing up blood, and four of them later died. In June 2000, preliminary phase II clinical trial results showed that erlizumab did not meet Genentech's goals. Genentech's primary goal was for the drug to increase blood flow to the heart within 90 minutes of administering the medicine.

== Other anti-CD18 drugs ==
Multiple companies have tried to develop anti-CD18 drugs, but none of them have been successful. Among them are Icos's rovelizumab (LeukArrest), and two drugs developed by Protein Design Labs and Centocor. Although trials in humans have not gone well, the research of CD18 drugs in animals has been encouraging. It is thought that the experimental medicines are affecting the lymphocyte adhesion pathway in humans in unintended ways. One hypothesis is that the endothelial cell barrier function fails when blood supply is low for a prolonged time in humans. If this is true, the drug is not able to stop lymphocyte movement into inflamed tissue.
