= Intercellular adhesion molecule =

Intercellular adhesion molecule (ICAM), N-terminal domain
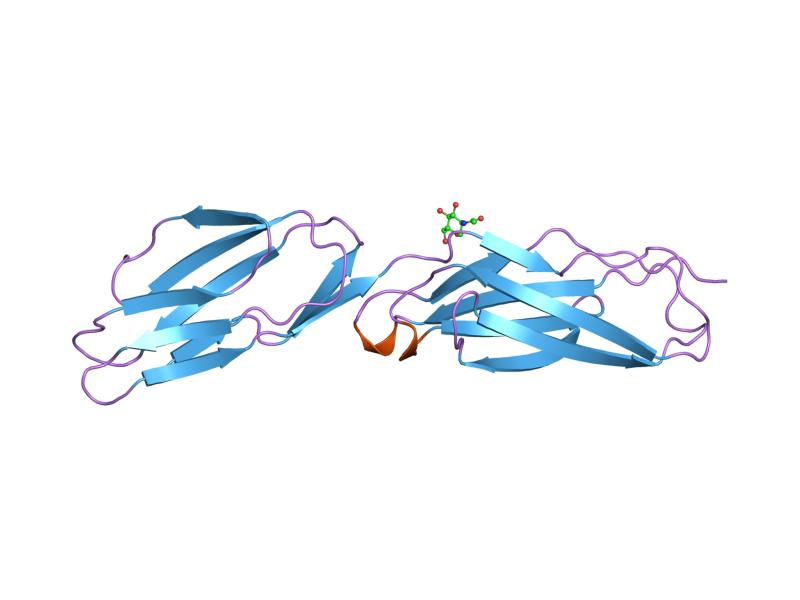
- structure of the two amino-terminal domains of human intercellular adhesion molecule-1, icam-1

Identifiers
- Symbol: ICAM_N
- Pfam: PF03921
- Pfam clan: CL0159
- InterPro: IPR013768
- SCOP2: 1zxq / SCOPe / SUPFAM
- Membranome: 219
Available protein structures:
- PDB: IPR013768 PF03921 (ECOD; PDBsum)
- AlphaFold: IPR013768; PF03921

In molecular biology, intercellular adhesion molecules (ICAMs) and vascular cell adhesion molecule-1 (VCAM-1) are part of the immunoglobulin superfamily. They are important in inflammation, immune responses and in intracellular signalling events. The ICAM family consists of five members, designated ICAM-1 to ICAM-5. They are known to bind to leucocyte integrins CD11/CD18 such as LFA-1 and Macrophage-1 antigen, during inflammation and in immune responses. Specifically, in the cellular events of acute inflammation, they help bind neutrophils to the endothelial surface. In addition, ICAMs may exist in soluble forms in human plasma, due to activation and proteolysis mechanisms at cell surfaces.

Mammalian intercellular adhesion molecules include:

- ICAM-1
- ICAM2
- ICAM3
- ICAM4
- ICAM5
