= CD11 =

In cell biology, CD11 is the α (alpha) component of various integrins, especially ones in which the β (beta) component is CD18 (β2) and mediate leukocyte adhesion. For example,

- LFA1 (CD11a/CD18) short representation of Lymphocyte Function-associated Antigen 1, also called α_{L}β_{2} integrin
- Mac1 (CD11b/CD18) present on macrophages that is also called Macrophage-1 antigen (CR3) and α_{M}β_{2} integrin.
- CD11c/CD18 also called complement receptor 4 (CR4) and α_{X}β_{2} integrin.
