= Rovelizumab =

Monoclonal antibody

Monoclonal antibody
- Type: Whole antibody
- Source: Humanized (from mouse)
- Target: CD11, CD18

Clinical data
- Trade names: LeukArrest
- ATC code: none

Identifiers
- CAS Number: 197099-66-4
- ChemSpider: none
- UNII: XLB16RJ01B

Rovelizumab, also known as LeukArrest and Hu23F2G, is a humanized monoclonal antibody which was an experimental immunosuppressive drug. It was developed by Icos to treat patients with haemorrhagic shock.

The drug is a monoclonal antibody that suppresses white blood cells which become overly active during shock. During testing, the number of patients given the drug was low because rovelizumab had to be delivered within four hours of the injury and consent was required. The patient was often unconscious and relatives had to be reached to give consent. In June 1998, Icos and many medical centers asked the United States Food and Drug Administration (FDA) to waive consent requirements in situations where the patient was at high risk of dying and relatives could not be reached. While some medical ethicists opposed waiving consent, the FDA approved the proposal in August 1998 for five medical centers.

Development of rovelizumab was halted in April 2000 when interim data from phase III clinical trials did not meet Icos' goals, which included reducing the chance of multiple organ failure and reducing the death-rate from shock at 28 days. Rovelizumab was also being tested for treating heart attack, multiple sclerosis, and stroke, and was being explored as a treatment for cerebral vasospasm, head trauma, kidney transplantation, and restenosis.

Multiple companies have tried to develop anti-CD18 drugs, but none of them have been successful. Among them are Genentech's erlizumab, and two drugs developed by Protein Design Labs and Centocor. Although trials in humans have not gone well, the research of anti-CD18 drugs in animals has been encouraging. It is thought that the experimental medicines are affecting the lymphocyte adhesion pathway in humans in unintended ways.
