= Mac1 =

MAC-1 may refer to:

- Macrophage-1 antigen
- Integrin alpha M
- Macintosh
