= Leukocyte adhesion deficiency =

Leukocyte-adhesion deficiency
- Specialty: Immunology

Leukocyte adhesion deficiency (LAD) is a rare autosomal recessive disorder characterized by immunodeficiency resulting in recurrent infections. LAD is currently divided into three subtypes: LAD1, LAD2, and the recently described LAD3, also known as LAD-1/variant. In LAD3, the immune defects are supplemented by a Glanzmann thrombasthenia-like bleeding tendency.

== Signs and symptoms ==
LAD was first recognized as a distinct clinical entity in the 1970s. The classic descriptions of LAD included recurrent bacterial infections, defects in neutrophil adhesion, and a delay in umbilical cord sloughing. The adhesion defects result in poor leukocyte chemotaxis, particularly neutrophil, inability to form pus and neutrophilia.

Individuals with LAD suffer from bacterial infections beginning in the neonatal period. Infections such as omphalitis, pneumonia, gingivitis, and peritonitis are common and often life-threatening due to the infant's inability to properly destroy the invading pathogens. These individuals do not form abscesses because granulocytes cannot migrate to the sites of infection.

== Cause ==
Leukocyte-adhesion deficiency has an autosomal recessive pattern of inheritance.

Types of leukocyte adhesion deficiency include LAD1, LAD2, and LAD3. LAD1 is the most common.

| Type | OMIM | Gene |
|---|---|---|
| LAD1 | 116920 | ITGB2 |
| LAD2 or CDG2C | 266265 | SLC35C1 |
| LAD3 | 612840 | FERMT3 |

Patients with LAD1 have an inherited molecular defect that causes a deficiency of the β-2 integrin subunit, also called CD18, which is encoded by the ITGB2 gene found on chromosome 21. This subunit is involved in the formation of the β-2 integrins (LFA-1, integrin alphaXbeta2/CR4/p150,95, and Mac-1/CR3) by dimerization with different CD11 subunits.

Mutations in the ITGB2 gene lead to absent, reduced, or aberrant CD18 protein expression, causing a lack of expression in the leukocyte membrane of the β-2 integrins. The main function of these proteins is to allow neutrophils to make their way out of the blood stream and into the infected tissues by adhering to different ligands expressed by the endothelium, e.g. ICAM-1. In LAD-I patients, neutrophils cannot extravasate and fight against bacteria in tissues. The bacteria can then proliferate, leading to symptomatic infection, which can spread unimpeded and cause serious injury to important tissues.

== Diagnosis ==
Typically, diagnosis involves several preliminary tests of immune function, including basic evaluation of the humoral immune system and the cell-mediated immune system. A WBC differential will reveal extremely elevated levels of neutrophils (on the order of 6–10x normal) because they are unable to leave the blood vessels. In the case of LAD-I, specific diagnosis is done by flow cytometry. This technique will reveal absent or reduced CD18 expression in the leukocyte membrane. Recently, prenatal diagnosis systems has been established, allowing an early detection of the disease. LAD-II diagnosis includes the study of different glycosylated forms of the transferrin protein. In LAD-III, as platelet function is also affected, this could be used to differentiate it from the other types.

== Treatment ==
Although patients can receive intensive antibiotherapy and even granulocyte transfusions from healthy donors, the only current curative therapy is the hematopoietic stem cell transplant. However, progress has been made in gene therapy, an active area of research. Both foamyviral and lentiviral vectors expressing the human ITGB2 gene under the control of different promoters have been developed and have been tested so far in preclinical LAD-I models (such as CD18-deficient mice and canine leukocyte adhesion deficiency-affected dogs).

== Prognosis ==
A 2009 study reported results from 36 children who had received a stem cell transplant. At the time of follow-up (median time 62 months), the survival rate was 75%.

== Epidemiology ==
LAD is a rare disease, with an estimated prevalence of one in 100,000 births, with no described racial or ethnic predilection. The most common type is LAD1.

== See also ==
- Congenital disorder of glycosylation
- Leukocyte adhesion cascade
