= Congenital disorder of glycosylation type IIc =

- Other names: Rambam-Hasharon syndrome, CDG-IIc, CDG2C
- This condition ia inherited via autosomal recessive manner

Congenital disorder of glycosylation type IIc or Leukocyte adhesion deficiency-2 (LAD2) is a type of leukocyte adhesion deficiency attributable to the absence of neutrophil sialyl-LewisX, a ligand of P- and E-selectin on vascular endothelium. It is associated with SLC35C1.

This disorder was discovered in two unrelated Israeli boys 3 and 5 years of age, each the offspring of consanguineous parents. Both had severe mental retardation, short stature, a distinctive facial appearance, and the Bombay (hh) blood phenotype, and both were secretor- and Lewis-negative. They both had had recurrent severe bacterial infections similar to those seen in patients with LAD1, including pneumonia, periodontitis, otitis media, and localized cellulitis. Similar to that in patients with LAD1, their infections were accompanied by pronounced leukocytosis (30,000 to 150,000/mm^{3}) but an absence of pus formation at sites of recurrent cellulitis. In vitro studies revealed a pronounced defect in neutrophil motility. Because the genes for the red blood cell H antigen and for the secretor status encode for distinct α1,2-fucosyltransferases and the synthesis of Sialyl-LewisX requires an α1,3-fucosyltransferase, it was postulated that a general defect in fucose metabolism is the basis for this disorder. It was subsequently found that GDP-L-fucose transport into Golgi vesicles was specifically impaired, and then missense mutations in the GDP-fucose transporter cDNA of three patients with LAD2 were discovered. Thus, GDP-fucose transporter deficiency is a cause of LAD2.

== See also ==
- Congenital disorder of glycosylation
- Leukocyte adhesion deficiency
