= Leukocyte adhesion deficiency-1 =

- Autosomal recessive is how this condition is inherited

Leukocyte adhesion deficiency-1 (LAD1) is a rare and often fatal genetic disorder in humans.

== Signs and symptoms ==
The main sign of the disease is life-threatening, recurrent bacterial or fungal soft tissue infections. These infections are often apparent at birth and may spread throughout the body. Omphalitis (infection of the umbilical cord stump) is common shortly after birth. Other signs include delayed separation of the umbilical cord, periodontal disease, elevated neutrophils, and impaired wound healing, but not increased vulnerability to viral infections or cancer. Such patients have fever as the manifestation of infection, inflammatory responses are indolent.

== Mechanism ==
LAD1 is caused by mutations in the ITGB2 gene which are inherited autorecessively. This gene encodes CD18, a protein present in several cell surface receptor complexes found on white blood cells, including lymphocyte function-associated antigen 1 (LFA-1), complement receptor 3 (CR-3), and complement receptor 4 (CR-4). The deficiency of LFA-1 causes neutrophils to be unable to adhere to and migrate out of blood vessels, so their counts can be high. It also impairs immune cell interaction, immune recognition, and cell-killing lymphocyte functions. The lack of CR3 interferes with chemotaxis, phagocytosis, and respiratory burst

== Diagnosis ==
Flow cytometry with monoclonal antibodies is used to screen for deficiencies of CD18.

== Treatment ==
Because the CD18 gene has been cloned and sequenced, this disorder is a potential candidate for gene therapy.

== Epidemiology ==
As of 2010, LAD1 has been observed in several hundred children worldwide.

== See also ==
- Leukocyte adhesion deficiency
