= Efalizumab =

Pharmaceutical drug

Monoclonal antibody
- Type: Whole antibody
- Source: Humanized (from mouse)
- Target: CD11a

Clinical data
- Trade names: Raptiva
- AHFS/Drugs.com: Monograph
- Routes of administration: Subcutaneous
- ATC code: L04AG02 (WHO)

Identifiers
- CAS Number: 214745-43-4
- DrugBank: DB00095
- ChemSpider: none
- UNII: XX2MN88N5D
- ChEMBL: ChEMBL1201575

Chemical and physical data
- Melting point: 66 °C (151 °F)

Efalizumab (brand name Raptiva) is a formerly available medication designed to treat autoimmune diseases, originally marketed to treat psoriasis. It is a recombinant humanized monoclonal antibody administered once weekly by subcutaneous injection. Efalizumab binds to the CD11a subunit of lymphocyte function-associated antigen 1 and acts as an immunosuppressant by inhibiting lymphocyte activation and cell migration out of blood vessels into tissues. Efalizumab was associated with fatal brain infections and was withdrawn from the market in 2009.

Known side effects include bacterial sepsis, viral meningitis, invasive fungal disease and progressive multifocal leukoencephalopathy (PML), a brain infection caused by reactivation of latent JC virus infection. Four cases of PML were reported in plaque psoriasis patients, an incidence of approximately one in 500 treated patients.

Due to the risk of PML, the European Medicines Agency (EMA) and the Food and Drug Administration (FDA) recommend suspension from the market in the European Union and the United States, respectively. In April 2009, Genentech Inc. announced a phased voluntary withdrawal of efalizumabhe U.S. market.
