= Christopher Henney =

American immunologist (born 1941)

- Born: 1941 (age 84–85); Birmingham, England
- Occupations: immunologist, biotechnology entrepreneur and corporate executive.

Christopher S. Henney (born 1941) is an Anglo American immunologist, biotechnology entrepreneur and corporate executive. He is known for cofounding the biotech technology companies, Immunex Corporation, Icos Corporation and Dendreon Corporation. He has also held academic positions in immunology and has been involved in the development and commercialization of biotechnology-based therapies, including Enbrel (etanercept) and Cialis (tadalafil).

== Early life and education ==
Henney was born in 1941 in Birmingham, England.He attended the King Edward VI Grammar School, Aston and the University of Birmingham. He earned a bachelor of science degree in medical biochemistry in 1962 and a PhD in experimental pathology in 1965. Later,he received a doctor of science degree from the University of Birmingham for contributions to immunology. In 2011, the university awarded him an honorary Doctor of the University degree in recognition of his contributions to the biotechnology industry.

== Academic career ==
Henney began his professional career as an academic immunologist. Following postdoctoral research in Colorado with Kimishige Ishizaka and at the WHO Immunoglobulin Reference Center in Lausanne, Switzerland, he held academic positions at Johns Hopkins University as an Associate Professor of medicine and the University of Washington as Professor of Immunology. He subsequently became associated with the Fred Hutchinson cancer research center in Seattle, where he was the first head of its Basic Immunology program. His academic work contributed to his later involvement in the emerging biotechnology industry.

== Biotechnology career ==
In 1981, Henney co-founded Immunex Corporation with Steven Gillis and Stephen Duzan. He held several executive and scientific positions at the at the company, including vice chairman, director and scientific director. Immunex, based in Seattle, became one of the nation`s major biotechnology companies and developed FDA -approved therapies, including Leukine (sargramostim) and Enbrel. Immunex was acquired by Amgen in 2002, in a transaction value of approximately $16 billion.

In 1989, Henney cofounded Icos corporation with George Rathman and Robert Nowinski. He served as executive vice president, scientific director and a member of the board. Icos developed Tadalafil, marketed as Cialis, for the treatment of erectile dysfunction. Eli Lilly acquired Icos in 2007. In 1995, Henney became chief executive officer of Dendreon corporation, a biotechnology company developing immunological approaches to cancer treatment. He served a CEO and Chairman from 1995 to 2003 and subsequently remained Executive Chairman until 2005. Dendreon developed Provenge, (sipuleucel-T) a cellular immunotherapy for prostate cancer that became the first therapeutic cancer vaccine approved by the U.S Food and Drug Administration in 2010. Henney's leadership of Dendreon led to the company`s relocation from Mountain View, California to Seattle and its expansion within the region’s biotechnology sector. Contemporary reporting described him as an important figure in the development of Seattle's biotechnology industry.

=== Corporate leadership ===
Following his executive career at Dendreon, Henney held board and leadership positions at a number of biotechnology and pharmaceutical companies in the USA and Australia. He served as chairman of Cascadian Therapeutics from 2006 to 2018 and was interim president and chief executive officer of the company during part of 2016. The company was acquired by Seattle Genetics in 2018. He also served on the board of many biotechnology companies including venture capital funded start up companies and publicly listed companies, primarily on NASDAQ , including Prothena, Sarepta Therapeutics , Anthera Pharmaceuticals, Cyclacel Pharmaceuticals, and Bionomics .

== Scientific work ==
Henney's early scientific research focused initially on the immunochemistry and antigenicity of immunoglobulins and later on cellular immunology based on T cell mediated immunity. Specifically, he reported extensively, on the role of cytotoxic T cells in immune defenses against cancer. Later, he increasingly combined scientific research with biotechnology company formation, and management. As a biotherapeutic executive, Henney was involved in translating immunological research into commercial therapeutic programs. His companies pursued treatments for conditions including cancer, autoimmune diseases, and other medical conditions. His work at Immunex, Icos, and Dendreon contributed to the development of biotechnology companies that subsequently became part of larger pharmaceutical enterprises and bought novel biotherapeutic products to market. He has written about biotechnology management and corporate organization. In 1998, he published an article in Nature Biotechnology discussing the development of corporate culture within biotechnology companies.

== Awards and honors ==
Honorary Doctor of the University, University of Birmingham, 2011, awarded by his alma mater in recognition of his contributions to the biotechnology industry. He was inducted to Biotechnology Hall of Fame in 2011 and Washington Life Science Hall of Fame in 2019.
