= SLC35H1 =

Protein-coding gene in humans

Identifiers
- Aliases: SLC35H1, BA394O2.1, C20orf5, CGI-15, OVCOV1, solute carrier family 35 member C2, Solute carrier family 35 member H1
- External IDs: MGI: 2385166; GeneCards: SLC35H1

Gene location (Human)
Chr.	Chromosome 20 (human)
Band	20q13.12	Start	46,345,980 bp
Band	20q13.12	End	46,364,458 bp

Gene location (Mouse)
Chr.	Chromosome 2 (mouse)
Band	2 H3|2 85.53 cM	Start	165,118,474 bp
Band	2 H3|2 85.53 cM	End	165,129,789 bp
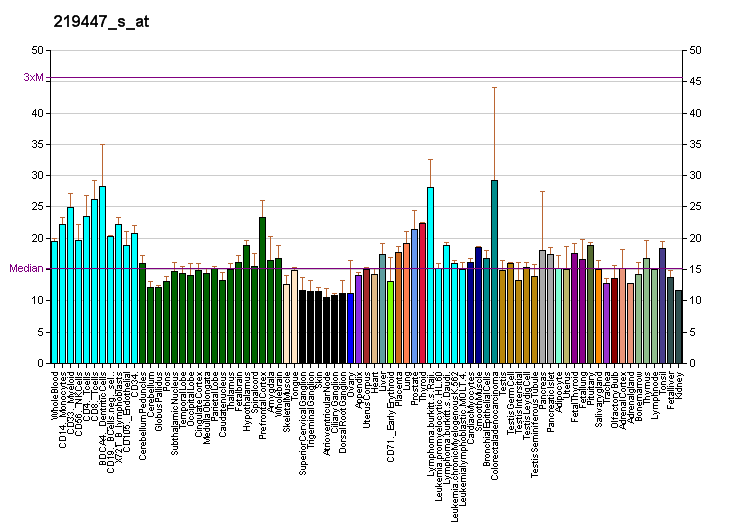
RNA expression pattern
Bgee	Human / Mouse (ortholog); Top expressed in: tendon of biceps brachii; right uterine tube; granulocyte; left lobe of thyroid gland; right lobe of thyroid gland; stromal cell of endometrium; right adrenal cortex; left adrenal cortex; right ovary; minor salivary glands / Top expressed in: lacrimal gland; granulocyte; duodenum; right kidney; dentate gyrus of hippocampal formation granule cell; yolk sac; jejunum; superior frontal gyrus; primary visual cortex; muscle of thigh; More reference expression data
BioGPS	More reference expression data
Gene ontology
Molecular function	antiporter activity; transmembrane transporter activity
Cellular component	integral component of membrane; cis-Golgi network; endoplasmic reticulum-Golgi intermediate compartment membrane; membrane; endoplasmic reticulum-Golgi intermediate compartment; nucleoplasm; Golgi apparatus
Biological process	protein O-linked fucosylation; fucosylation; negative regulation of gene expression; positive regulation of Notch signaling pathway; UDP-glucose transmembrane transport
Sources:Amigo / QuickGO
Orthologs
Databases	NCBI: entry; OMA: entry
Species	Human	Mouse
Entrez	51006	228875
Ensembl	ENSG00000080189	ENSMUSG00000017664
UniProt	Q9NQQ7	Q8VCX2
RefSeq (mRNA)	NM_001281457; NM_001281458; NM_001281459; NM_001281460; NM_015945 NM_173073; NM_173179	NM_001252573; NM_001252574; NM_001252575; NM_144893; NM_001363015 NM_001363016
RefSeq (protein)	NP_001268386; NP_001268387; NP_001268388; NP_001268389; NP_057029 NP_775096; NP_775271	NP_001239502; NP_001239503; NP_001239504; NP_659142; NP_001349944 NP_001349945
Location (UCSC)	Chr 20: 46.35 – 46.36 Mb	Chr 2: 165.12 – 165.13 Mb
PubMed search
- Wikidata
View/Edit Human	View/Edit Mouse

Solute carrier family 35 member H1 is a protein that in humans is encoded by the SLC35H1 gene (previously SLC35C2). This protein was originally thought to act as a GDP-fucose transporter like its homolog SLC35C1, but later research has suggested that this is not the case.

Oxygenation levels play an important role in the regulation of cellular invasiveness which occurs during early implantation when the trophoblast cells invade the uterus as well as during tumour progression and metastasis. This gene, which is regulated by oxygen tension, is induced in hypoxic trophoblast cells and is overexpressed in ovarian cancer. Two protein isoforms are encoded by transcript variants of this gene.
