= ICAM4 =

Protein found in humans

Identifiers
- Aliases: ICAM4, CD242, LW, intercellular adhesion molecule 4 (Landsteiner-Wiener blood group)
- External IDs: OMIM: 614088; MGI: 1925619; GeneCards: ICAM4

Gene location (Human)
Chr.	Chromosome 19 (human)
Band	19p13.2	Start	10,286,955 bp
Band	19p13.2	End	10,288,522 bp

Gene location (Mouse)
Chr.	Chromosome 9 (mouse)
Band	9 A3|9 7.69 cM	Start	20,940,669 bp
Band	9 A3|9 7.69 cM	End	20,941,891 bp
RNA expression pattern
Bgee	Human / Mouse (ortholog); Top expressed in: testicle; monocyte; granulocyte; bone marrow; stromal cell of endometrium; blood; right lung; amniotic fluid; bone marrow cell; sperm / Top expressed in: fetal liver hematopoietic progenitor cell; tibiofemoral joint; morula; embryo; human fetus; yolk sac; blastocyst; embryo; gastrula; decidua; More reference expression data
BioGPS	n/a
Gene ontology
Molecular function	integrin binding; protein binding
Cellular component	integral component of membrane; extracellular region; plasma membrane; integral component of plasma membrane; membrane
Biological process	cell adhesion; extracellular matrix organization; regulation of immune response; cell-cell adhesion
Sources:Amigo / QuickGO
Orthologs
Databases	NCBI: entry; OMA: entry
Species	Human	Mouse
Entrez	3386	78369
Ensembl	ENSG00000105371	ENSMUSG00000001014
UniProt	Q14773	Q9ERM2
RefSeq (mRNA)	NM_022377; NM_001039132; NM_001544	NM_023892; NM_001364509
RefSeq (protein)	NP_001034221; NP_001535	NP_076381; NP_001351438
Location (UCSC)	Chr 19: 10.29 – 10.29 Mb	Chr 9: 20.94 – 20.94 Mb
PubMed search
- Wikidata
View/Edit Human	View/Edit Mouse

The LW blood system was first described by Landsteiner and Wiener in 1940. It was often confused with the Rh system, not becoming a separate antigen system until 1982. The LW and RhD antigens are genetically independent though they are phenotypically related and the LW antigen is expressed more strongly on RhD positive cells than on RhD negative cells. In most populations, the antithetical LW antigens, LW^{a} and LW^{b} are present as very high and very low frequency, respectively.

== Nomenclature ==
The LW glycoprotein has recently been renamed ICAM-4 due to its similarity to intercellular adhesion molecule, although exactly which integrins bind to ICAM-4 is subject to controversy.

== Gene ==
The LW locus is located on the short arm of chromosome 19 (19p13.3).

== Tissue distribution ==
LW antigens reside on a 40- to 42-kilodalton red cell membrane glycoprotein named CD242.

== Function ==
The function of ICAM-4 is not fully understood but appears to be restricted to erythroid cells. During in vitro erythropoesis, LW appears at either the erythroid colony forming stage or later at the proerythroblast stage. A vital part of erythropoesis is the clustering of erythroblasts around bone marrow macrophages to form erythroblastic islands. The erythroblast is then able to remove its nucleus, which is in turn ingested and broken down by the macrophages, to become a mature erythrocyte. During this process ICAM-4 binds to VLA-4, an erythroblast binding site, on adjacent erythroblasts and to αv integrins on macrophages to help stabilise the erythroblastic islands. The binding of red cells to macrophages in the spleen by ICAM-4 could also play a part in the removal of senescent red cells.

Despite the functional aspects of ICAM-4, its apparent absence in LW(a-b-) and Rh_{null} phenotypes does not appear to lead to any obvious pathological effects. ICAM-4 expression is elevated on sickle red cells and its binding to αv integrins on the endothelial cells may cause the pain associated with sickle cell crises.

Auto anti-LW is not uncommon as an autoantibody but usually presents with transient suppression of the LW antigen in genetically LW+ individuals, and so appears to be an alloantibody. True alloanti-LW is a very rare occurrence, with only two known examples of alloanti-LW^{ab}, produced by patients with an LW(a-b-) phenotype. Anti-LW can be present as a clinically insignificant autoantibody and not be associated with increased red cell destruction. Anti-LW has also been associated with cases of warm type autoimmune haemolytic anaemia; Philip Levine suggested that it was the most common antibody in cases of AIHA with a positive Coombs test.

== Clinical significance ==
=== Transfusion medicine ===
Haemolytic disease of the newborn (HDFN) due to alloanti-LW is described as mild and very rare, even the very potent anti-LW^{ab} of one known patient caused minimal evidence of HDFN in her three pregnancies. To date auto anti-LW has only been implicated as the cause of one case of HDFN.

=== Diagnostic ===
Clinical testing in patient care for LW antigens follows published minimum quality and operational requirements, similar to red cell genotyping for any of the other recognized blood group systems. Molecular analysis can identify gene variants (alleles) that may affect LW antigens expression on the red cell membrane.
