= SLC35G2 =

Protein-coding gene in the species Homo sapiens

Identifiers
- Aliases: SLC35G2, TMEM22, solute carrier family 35 member G2
- External IDs: OMIM: 617812; MGI: 2685365; GeneCards: SLC35G2

Gene location (Human)
Chr.	Chromosome 3 (human)
Band	3q22.3	Start	136,818,647 bp
Band	3q22.3	End	136,855,888 bp

Gene location (Mouse)
Chr.	Chromosome 9 (mouse)
Band	9|9 E3.3	Start	100,434,241 bp
Band	9|9 E3.3	End	100,453,143 bp
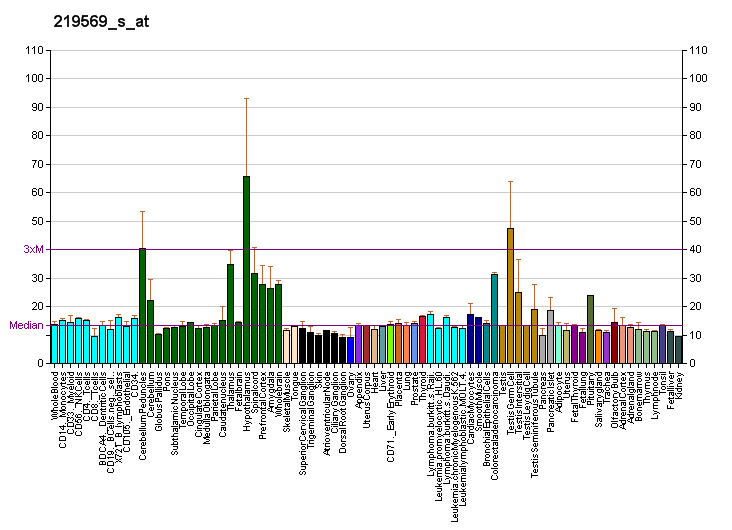
RNA expression pattern
Bgee	Human / Mouse (ortholog); Top expressed in: sperm; cartilage tissue; secondary oocyte; islet of Langerhans; pericardium; cerebellar vermis; pons; anterior pituitary; endothelial cell; cerebellar hemisphere / Top expressed in: islet of Langerhans; hypothalamus; cerebellar cortex; adrenal medulla; primary visual cortex; olfactory bulb; embryo; dentate gyrus of hippocampal formation granule cell; Cortex of frontal lobe; cochlea; More reference expression data
BioGPS	More reference expression data
Orthologs
Databases	NCBI: entry; OMA: entry
Species	Human	Mouse
Entrez	80723	245020
Ensembl	ENSG00000168917	ENSMUSG00000070287
UniProt	Q8TBE7	D3YVE8
RefSeq (mRNA)	NM_001097599; NM_001097600; NM_025246	NM_001101483
RefSeq (protein)	NP_001091068; NP_001091069; NP_079522	NP_001094953
Location (UCSC)	Chr 3: 136.82 – 136.86 Mb	Chr 9: 100.43 – 100.45 Mb
PubMed search
- Wikidata
View/Edit Human	View/Edit Mouse

Solute carrier family 35 member G2 is a protein that in humans is encoded by the SLC35G2 gene (previously TMEM22). Not much has been reported about the function of this protein.

== See also ==
- EamA
