= Soluble cell adhesion molecules =

Soluble cell adhesion molecules (sCAMs) are a class of cell adhesion molecule (CAMs - cell surface binding proteins) that may represent important biomarkers for inflammatory processes involving activation or damage to cells such as platelets and the endothelium.

They include soluble isoforms of the cell adhesion molecules ICAM-1, VCAM-1, E-selectin and P-selectin (distinguished as sICAM-1, sVCAM-1, sE-selectin and sP-selectin). The cellular expression of CAMs is difficult to assess clinically, but these soluble forms are present in the circulation and may serve as markers for CAMs.

Research has focused on their role in cardiovascular (particularly atherosclerosis), connective tissue and neoplastic diseases, where blood plasma levels may be a marker of the disease severity or prognosis, and they may be useful in evaluating progress of some treatments.

Many studies have postulated that increased production of cell adhesion molecules (CAMs) on the vascular endothelium (blood vessel lining) plays a role in the development of arterial plaque, with the suggestion from both in vitro and in vivo studies that the CAM production is increased by dyslipidemia (abnormal lipid levels in the blood).

Research studies have used sCAMs as biomarkers to measure correlations with nutrients or nutrient levels as significant, or not.
