= Integrin alpha L =

Mammalian protein found in Homo sapiens

ITGAL
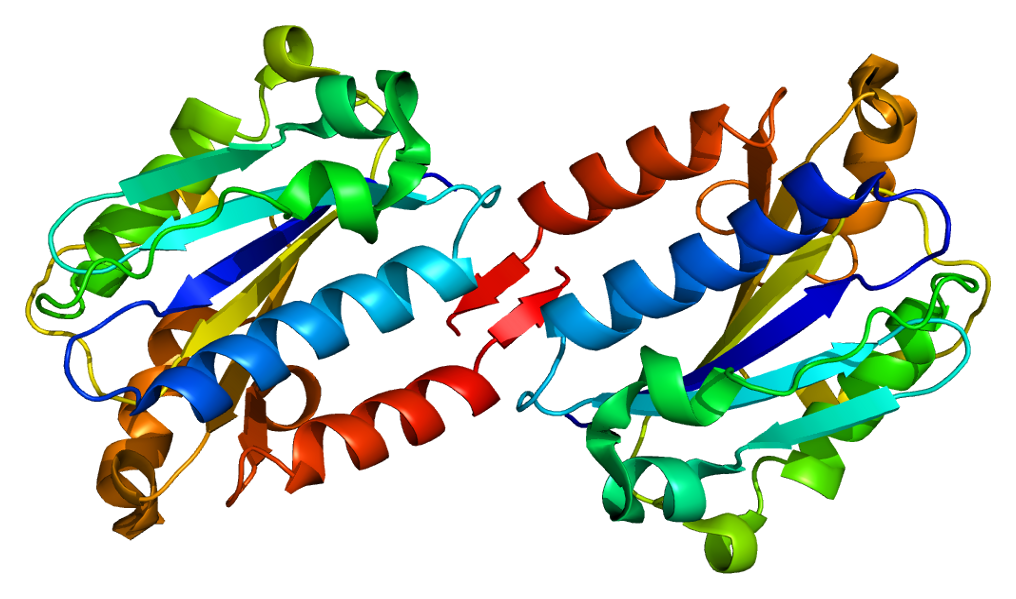

Identifiers
- Aliases: ITGAL, CD11A, LFA-1, LFA1A, integrin subunit alpha L
- External IDs: OMIM: 153370; MGI: 96606; GeneCards: ITGAL
Available structures
PDB	Ortholog search: PDBe RCSB
PDB	List of PDB id codes 4IXD, 1CQP, 1DGQ, 1LFA, 1MJN, 1MQ8, 1MQ9, 1MQA, 1RD4, 1T0P, 1XDD, 1XDG, 1XUO, 1ZON, 1ZOO, 1ZOP, 2ICA, 2K8O, 2M3E, 2O7N, 3BN3, 3BQM, 3BQN, 3E2M, 3EOA, 3EOB, 3F74, 3F78, 3HI6, 3M6F, 3TCX, 5E6S, 5E6R, 5E6U

Gene location (Human)
Chr.	Chromosome 16 (human)
Band	16p11.2	Start	30,472,658 bp
Band	16p11.2	End	30,523,567 bp

Gene location (Mouse)
Chr.	Chromosome 7 (mouse)
Band	7 F3|7 69.44 cM	Start	126,895,432 bp
Band	7 F3|7 69.44 cM	End	126,934,310 bp
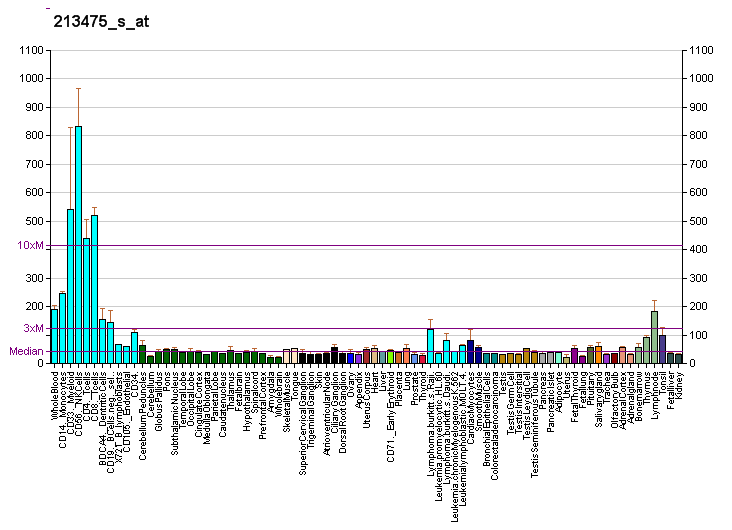
RNA expression pattern
Bgee	Human / Mouse (ortholog); Top expressed in: granulocyte; monocyte; blood; spleen; lymph node; bone marrow cell; appendix; thymus; upper lobe of left lung; epithelium of colon / Top expressed in: granulocyte; thymus; mesenteric lymph nodes; blood; spleen; subcutaneous adipose tissue; submandibular gland; bone marrow; right lung lobe; stroma of bone marrow; More reference expression data
BioGPS	More reference expression data
Gene ontology
Molecular function	protein-containing complex binding; metal ion binding; protein binding; protein heterodimerization activity; ICAM-3 receptor activity; cell adhesion molecule binding
Cellular component	integral component of membrane; integrin alphaL-beta2 complex; membrane; cell surface; integrin complex; extracellular exosome; plasma membrane; specific granule membrane
Biological process	leukocyte cell-cell adhesion; heterophilic cell-cell adhesion via plasma membrane cell adhesion molecules; T cell activation via T cell receptor contact with antigen bound to MHC molecule on antigen presenting cell; extracellular matrix organization; receptor clustering; cell adhesion; regulation of immune response; integrin-mediated signaling pathway; cell-matrix adhesion; inflammatory response; leukocyte migration; signal transduction; phagocytosis; neutrophil degranulation; cell-cell adhesion
Sources:Amigo / QuickGO
Orthologs
Databases	NCBI: entry; OMA: entry
Species	Human	Mouse
Entrez	3683	16408
Ensembl	ENSG00000005844	ENSMUSG00000030830
UniProt	P20701	P24063
RefSeq (mRNA)	NM_001114380; NM_002209	NM_001253872; NM_001253873; NM_001253874; NM_008400
RefSeq (protein)	NP_001107852; NP_002200	NP_001240801; NP_001240802; NP_001240803; NP_032426
Location (UCSC)	Chr 16: 30.47 – 30.52 Mb	Chr 7: 126.9 – 126.93 Mb
PubMed search
- Wikidata
View/Edit Human	View/Edit Mouse

Integrin, alpha L (antigen CD11A (p180), lymphocyte function-associated antigen 1; alpha polypeptide), also known as ITGAL, is a protein that in humans is encoded by the ITGAL gene. CD11a functions in the immune system. It is involved in cellular adhesion and costimulatory signaling. It is the target of the drug efalizumab.

== Function ==
ITGAL gene encodes the integrin alpha L chain. Integrins are heterodimeric integral membrane proteins composed of an alpha chain and a beta chain. This I-domain containing alpha integrin combines with the beta 2 chain (ITGB2) to form the integrin lymphocyte function-associated antigen-1 (LFA-1), which is expressed in all leukocytes. LFA-1 plays a central role in leukocyte intercellular adhesion through interactions with its ligands, ICAMs 1-3 (intercellular adhesion molecules 1 through 3), and also functions in lymphocyte costimulatory signaling.

CD11a is one of the two components, along with CD18, which form lymphocyte function-associated antigen-1.

Efalizumab acts as an immunosuppressant by binding to CD11a but was withdrawn in 2009 because it was associated with severe side effects.

== Interactions ==
CD11a has been shown to interact with ICAM-1.

== See also ==
- CD11c
- integrin
- leukocyte adhesion deficiency
- Cluster of differentiation
