= Complement receptor =

Identifiers
- Symbol: Complement receptor
- Membranome: 116

A complement receptor is a membrane-bound receptor belonging to the complement system, which is part of the innate immune system. Complement receptors bind effector protein fragments that are produced in response to antigen-antibody complexes or damage-associated molecules. Complement receptor activation contributes to the regulation of inflammation, leukocyte extravasation, and phagocytosis; it also contributes to the adaptive immune response. Different complement receptors can participate in either the classical complement pathway, the alternative complement pathway, or both.

== Expression and function ==
White blood cells, particularly monocytes and macrophages, express complement receptors on their surface. All four complement receptors can bind to fragments of complement component 3 or complement component 4 coated on pathogen surface, but the receptors trigger different downstream activities. Complement receptor (CR) 1, 3, and 4 function as opsonins which stimulate phagocytosis, whereas CR2 is expressed only on B cells as a co-receptor.

Red blood cells (RBCs) also express CR1, which enables RBCs to carry complement-bound antigen-antibody complexes to the liver and spleen for degradation.

CR #	Name	Molecular weight (Da, approx.)	Ligand	CD	Major cell types^{a}	Major activities
CR1	Complement receptor 1	190,000–250,000	C3b, C4b, iC3b	CD35	B, E, FDC, Mac, M0, PMN	Immune complex transport (E); phagocytosis (PMN, Mac); immune adhesion (E); cofactor and decay-acceleration; secondary Epstein-Barr virus receptor
CR2	Complement receptor 2	145,000	C3d, iC3b, C3dg, Epstein-Barr virus	CD21	B, FDC	B cell coactivator, primary Epstein-Barr virus receptor, CD23 receptor
CR3	Macrophage-1 antigen or "integrin α_{M}β_{2}"	170,000 α chain + common 95,000 β chain	iC3b	CD11b+CD18	FDC, Mac, M0, PMN	Leukocyte adherence, phagocytosis of iC3b-bound particles
CR4	Integrin alphaXbeta2 or "p150,95"	150,000 α chain + common 95,000 β chain	iC3b	CD11c+CD18	D, Mac, M0, PMN	Leukocyte adhesion
C3AR1	C3a receptor	75,000	C3a	–	Endo, MC, Pha	Cell activation
C5AR1	C5a receptor	50,000	C5a	CD88	Endo, MC, Pha	Cell activation, immune polarization, chemotaxis
C5AR2	C5a receptor 2	36,000	C5a	–		Chemotaxis

a.B: B cell. E: erythrocyte. Endo: endothelial cell. D: dendritic cell. FDC: follicular dendritic cell. Mac: macrophage. MC: mast cell. M0: monocyte. Pha: phagocyte. PMN: polymorphonuclear leukocyte.

== Clinical significance ==
Deficits in complement receptor expression can cause disease. Mutations in complement receptors which alter receptor function can also increase risk of certain diseases.

== See also ==
- Complement system
- Humoral immunity
- Immune system
