= ICAM5 =

Protein-coding gene in the species Homo sapiens

Identifiers
- Aliases: ICAM5, TLCN, TLN, intercellular adhesion molecule 5
- External IDs: OMIM: 601852; MGI: 109430; GeneCards: ICAM5
Available structures
PDB	Ortholog search: PDBe RCSB
PDB	List of PDB id codes 3BN3, 4OI9, 4OIA, 4OIB

Gene location (Human)
Chr.	Chromosome 19 (human)
Band	19p13.2	Start	10,289,952 bp
Band	19p13.2	End	10,296,778 bp

Gene location (Mouse)
Chr.	Chromosome 9 (mouse)
Band	9 A3|9 7.7 cM	Start	20,943,369 bp
Band	9 A3|9 7.7 cM	End	20,950,332 bp
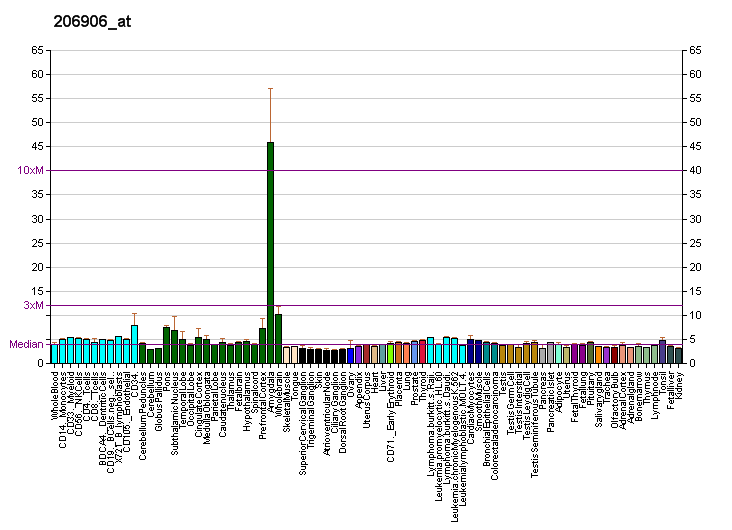
RNA expression pattern
Bgee	Human / Mouse (ortholog); Top expressed in: right frontal lobe; prefrontal cortex; cingulate gyrus; anterior cingulate cortex; nucleus accumbens; dorsolateral prefrontal cortex; Brodmann area 9; caudate nucleus; frontal pole; hippocampus proper / Top expressed in: entorhinal cortex; perirhinal cortex; CA3 field; dentate gyrus of hippocampal formation granule cell; superior frontal gyrus; primary visual cortex; hippocampus proper; Region I of hippocampus proper; nucleus accumbens; prefrontal cortex; More reference expression data
BioGPS	More reference expression data
Gene ontology
Molecular function	integrin binding; protein binding
Cellular component	integral component of membrane; plasma membrane; integral component of plasma membrane; membrane
Biological process	cell adhesion; phagocytosis; regulation of immune response; extracellular matrix organization; cell-cell adhesion
Sources:Amigo / QuickGO
Orthologs
Databases	NCBI: entry; OMA: entry
Species	Human	Mouse
Entrez	7087	15898
Ensembl	ENSG00000105376	ENSMUSG00000032174
UniProt	Q9UMF0	Q60625
RefSeq (mRNA)	NM_003259	NM_008319
RefSeq (protein)	NP_003250	NP_032345
Location (UCSC)	Chr 19: 10.29 – 10.3 Mb	Chr 9: 20.94 – 20.95 Mb
PubMed search
- Wikidata
View/Edit Human	View/Edit Mouse

Intercellular adhesion molecule 5 is a protein that in humans is encoded by the ICAM5 gene.

The protein encoded by this gene is a member of the intercellular adhesion molecule (ICAM) family. All ICAM proteins are type I transmembrane glycoproteins, contain 2-9 immunoglobulin-like C2-type domains, and bind to the leukocyte adhesion LFA-1 protein. This protein is expressed on the surface of telencephalic neurons and displays two types of adhesion activity, homophilic binding between neurons and heterophilic binding between neurons and leukocytes. It may be a critical component in neuron-microglial cell interactions in the course of normal development or as part of neurodegenerative diseases.

Studies mentioned a role for ICAM5 in cell adhesion and cell signalling and dysregulation and disfunction of it will increase the risk of breast cancer. Study of the association between polymorphisms and breast cancer has been shown that ICAM5 rs1056538 and ICAM5 rs281439 variants might contribute the most in the development of breast cancer.

== Interactions ==
ICAM5 has been shown to interact with PSEN1.
