= FERMT3 =

Protein-coding gene in humans

Identifiers
- Aliases: FERMT3, KIND3, MIG-2, MIG2B, UNC112C, URP2, URP2SF, fermitin family member 3, FERM domain containing kindlin 3
- External IDs: OMIM: 607901; MGI: 2147790; GeneCards: FERMT3
Available structures
PDB	Ortholog search: PDBe RCSB
PDB	List of PDB id codes 2YS3

Gene location (Human)
Chr.	Chromosome 11 (human)
Band	11q13.1	Start	64,206,678 bp
Band	11q13.1	End	64,223,891 bp

Gene location (Mouse)
Chr.	Chromosome 19 (mouse)
Band	19|19 A	Start	6,976,326 bp
Band	19|19 A	End	6,996,837 bp
RNA expression pattern
Bgee	Human / Mouse (ortholog); Top expressed in: granulocyte; monocyte; spleen; bone marrow cell; appendix; blood; lymph node; upper lobe of left lung; right lung; thymus / Top expressed in: stroma of bone marrow; tibiofemoral joint; blood; spleen; granulocyte; mesenteric lymph nodes; body of femur; fetal liver hematopoietic progenitor cell; thymus; internal carotid artery; More reference expression data
BioGPS	n/a
Gene ontology
Molecular function	integrin binding
Cellular component	podosome; cell junction; cell projection; extracellular exosome; membrane; extracellular region; platelet alpha granule lumen
Biological process	leukocyte cell-cell adhesion; integrin-mediated signaling pathway; regulation of cell-cell adhesion mediated by integrin; integrin activation; substrate adhesion-dependent cell spreading; cell adhesion; platelet aggregation; positive regulation of cell migration; platelet degranulation
Sources:Amigo / QuickGO
Orthologs
Databases	NCBI: entry; OMA: entry
Species	Human	Mouse
Entrez	83706	108101
Ensembl	ENSG00000149781	ENSMUSG00000024965
UniProt	Q86UX7	Q8K1B8
RefSeq (mRNA)	NM_031471; NM_178443; NM_001382361; NM_001382362; NM_001382363 NM_001382364; NM_001382448	NM_153795; NM_001362399
RefSeq (protein)	NP_113659; NP_848537; NP_001369290; NP_001369291; NP_001369292 NP_001369293; NP_001369377	NP_722490; NP_001349328
Location (UCSC)	Chr 11: 64.21 – 64.22 Mb	Chr 19: 6.98 – 7 Mb
PubMed search
- Wikidata
View/Edit Human	View/Edit Mouse

Fermitin family homolog 3 (FERMT3), also known as kindlin-3 (KIND3), MIG2-like protein (MIG2B), or unc-112-related protein 2 (URP2) is a protein that in humans is encoded by the FERMT3 gene. This protein is involved in the cell adhesion of hematopoietic (blood-cell producing) cells.

== Kindlin family ==
The kindlin family of proteins, member of the B4.1 superfamily, comprises three conserved protein homologues, kindlin 1, 2, and 3. They each contain a bipartite FERM domain comprising four subdomains F0, F1, F2, and F3 that show homology with the FERM head (H) domain of the cytoskeletal Talin protein. Kindlins have been linked to Kindler syndrome, leukocyte adhesion deficiency, cancer and other acquired human diseases. They are essential in the organisation of focal adhesions that mediate cell-extracellular matrix junctions and are involved in other cellular compartments that control cell-cell contacts and nucleus functioning. Therefore, they are responsible for cell to cell crosstalk via cell-cell contacts and integrin mediated cell adhesion through focal adhesion proteins and as specialised adhesion structures of hematopoietic cells they are also present in podosome's F actin surrounding ring structure. Isoform 2 may act as a repressor of NF-kappa-B and apoptosis

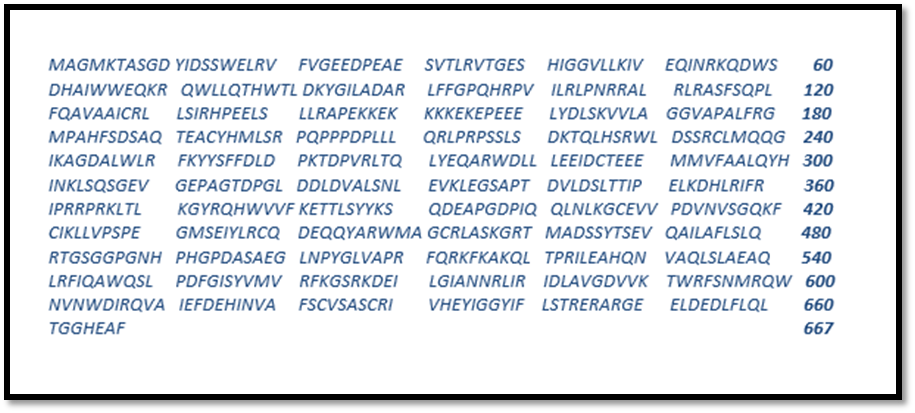
FERMT-3 protein sequence

== Evolution ==
It has been suggested that the evolutionary source of a single ancestral Kindlin protein is the earliest metazoa, the Parazoa. Within vertebrates, these ancestral proteins were subjected to duplication processes in order to arrive at the actual Kindlin family. In comparison with other members of the B4.1 superfamily of proteins, the FERM domains in Kindlin homologues have a greater degree of conservation. The presence of an inserted pleckstrin homology domain within the FERM domain, suggests that the metazoan evolution of the FERM domain is the origination from a proto-talin protein in unicellular or proto-multicellular organisms.

== Function ==
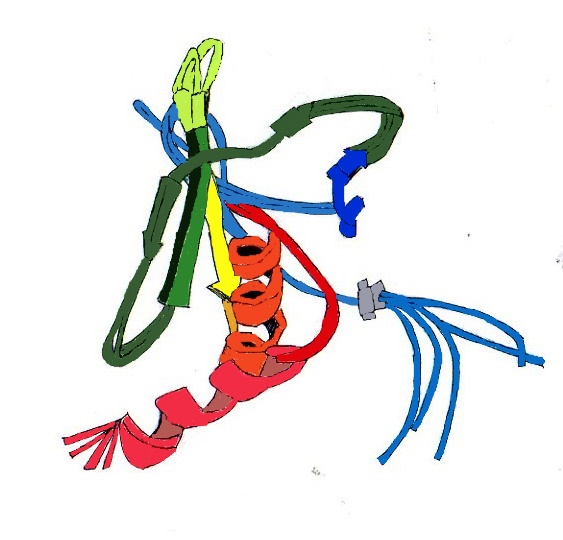
FERMT 3 Structure

The FERMT3 protein has a key role in the regulation of hemostasis and thrombosis. This protein may also help maintain the membrane skeleton of erythrocytes. Kindlin 3 is a cytoskeletal signalling protein involved in the activation of the glycoprotein receptor, integrin. Together with the Talin protein it binds cooperatively to beta integrin's cytoplasmic domain causing tail reorientation, thus altering the molecule's conformation. Modification of integrin's conformation serves to dissociate alpha and beta subunits by disrupting their interactions and helping the molecule adopt a high affinity state. FERMT3 functions as a stabilizer of the cytoskeleton and regulates its dynamics in cell and organelle motility.

== Clinical significance ==
FERMT3 mutations can result in autosomal recessive leukocyte adhesion deficiency syndrome-III (LAD-III). a deficiency in beta1, beta2 and beta3 integrin activation in platelets and leukocytes that causes haemorrhaging and recurrent infections. Loss of FERMT3 expression in leukocytes compromises their adhesion to the inflamed endothelia and affects neutrophil binding and spreading while selectin mediated rolling is unaffected. It has also been found that FERMT3 lowers Natural Killer cell’s activation threshold, such that a loss of FERMT3 affects single receptor activation of NK cell-mediated cytotoxicity but has no impact on multiple receptors, where the protein deficiency is overcome and target cells are killed.

FERMT3 deficiency on β(2) integrin function depend on both cell type (Natural killer cell or Leukocytes) and the integrin activation stimulus. The prevention of the beta-3 activation is specifically related to LAD-3, causing Glanzmann's thrombasthenia symptoms, a condition in which patients bleed excessively. Leukocyte adhesion deficiency is diagnosed clinically and by complete blood counts that reveal leukocytosis with neutrophilia. Management and treatment of this disease aim to control these recurrent infections by antibiotics and blood transfusions, with bone marrow transplantation as the only curative measure. Failure to express the FERMT3 protein disrupts the ability to form clots and coagulate by preventing integrin αIIβ3-mediated platelet aggregation.
