= ICAM-1 =

Mammalian protein found in Homo sapiens

ICAM1
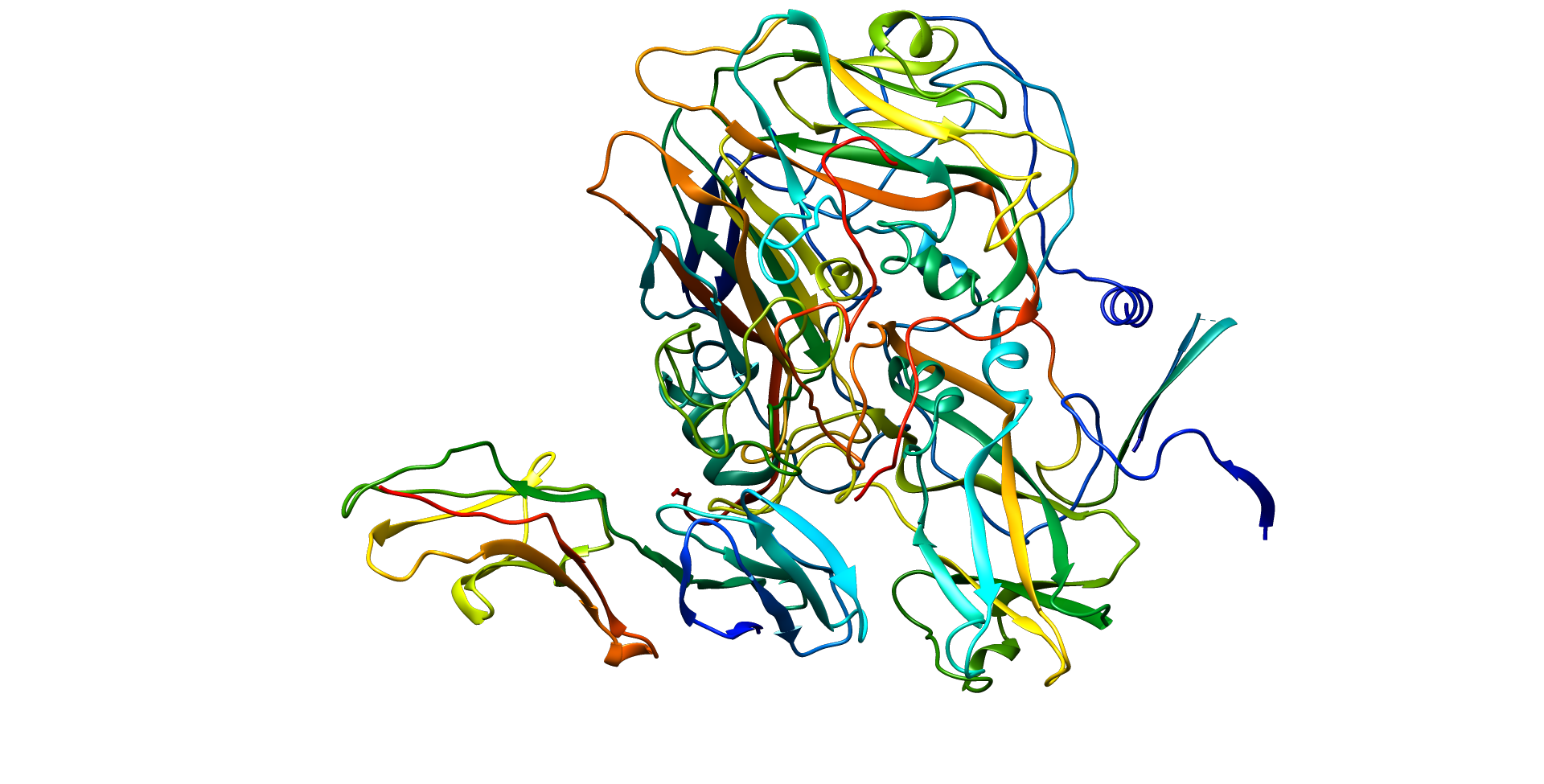

Identifiers
- Aliases: ICAM1, BB2, CD54, P3.58, intercellular adhesion molecule 1
- External IDs: OMIM: 147840; MGI: 96392; GeneCards: ICAM1
Available structures
PDB	Ortholog search: PDBe RCSB
PDB	List of PDB id codes 1D3E, 1D3I, 1D3L, 1IAM, 1IC1, 1MQ8, 1P53, 1Z7Z, 2OZ4, 3TCX

Gene location (Human)
Chr.	Chromosome 19 (human)
Band	19p13.2	Start	10,271,093 bp
Band	19p13.2	End	10,286,615 bp

Gene location (Mouse)
Chr.	Chromosome 9 (mouse)
Band	9 A3|9 7.69 cM	Start	20,927,281 bp
Band	9 A3|9 7.69 cM	End	20,940,113 bp
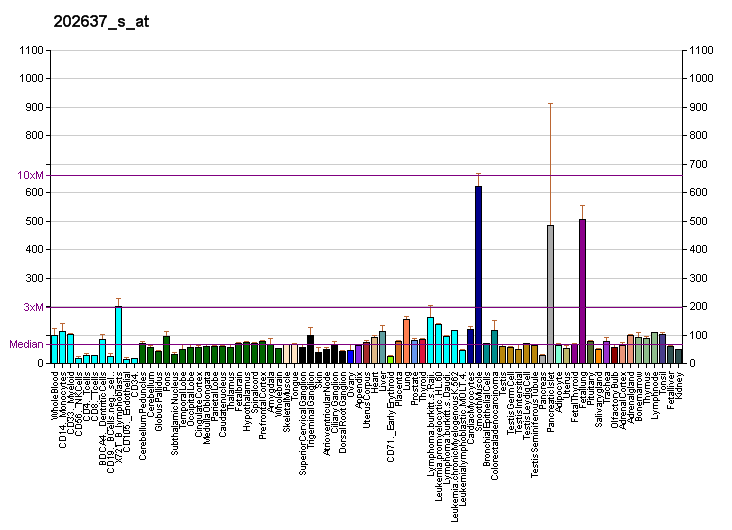

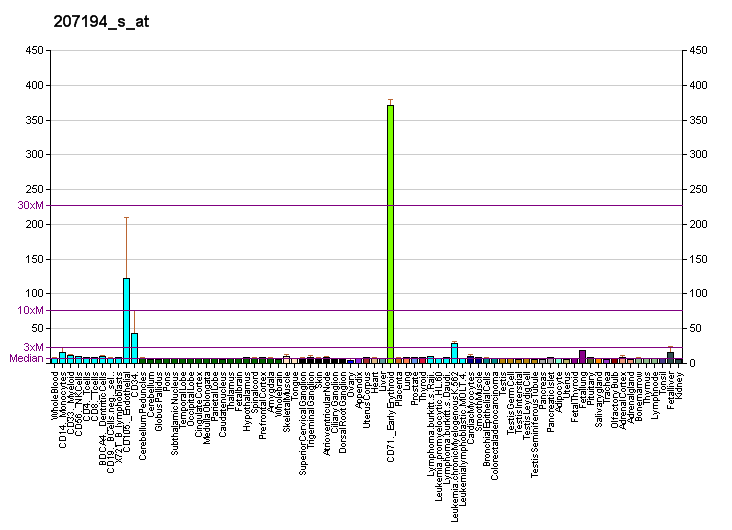

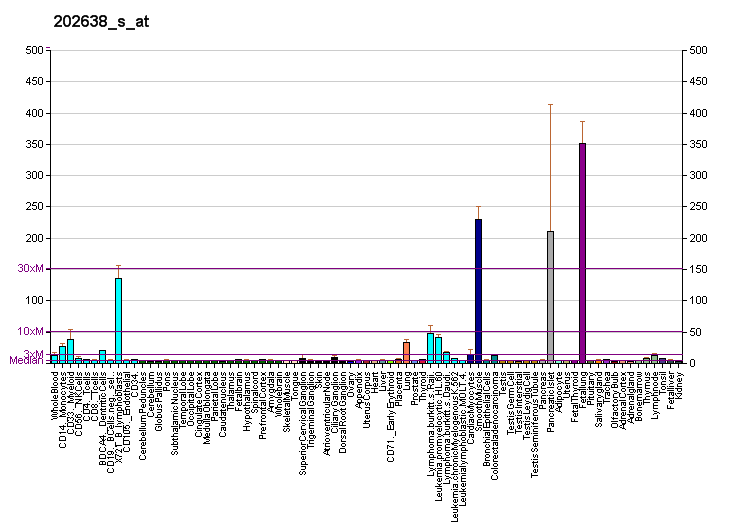
RNA expression pattern
Bgee	Human / Mouse (ortholog); Top expressed in: vena cava; upper lobe of left lung; cartilage tissue; right lung; beta cell; gallbladder; lower lobe of lung; spleen; monocyte; lymph node / Top expressed in: right lung lobe; left lung; left lung lobe; mesenteric lymph nodes; decidua; spleen; ankle joint; gastrula; thymus; aortic valve; More reference expression data
BioGPS	More reference expression data
Gene ontology
Molecular function	virus receptor activity; protein-containing complex binding; integrin binding; protein binding; transmembrane signaling receptor activity; signaling receptor activity
Cellular component	integral component of membrane; membrane; focal adhesion; plasma membrane; integral component of plasma membrane; cell surface; immunological synapse; membrane raft; extracellular exosome; external side of plasma membrane; extracellular space; extracellular matrix; collagen-containing extracellular matrix
Biological process	leukocyte cell-cell adhesion; response to ionizing radiation; establishment of endothelial barrier; negative regulation of endothelial cell apoptotic process; cellular response to organic substance; heterophilic cell-cell adhesion via plasma membrane cell adhesion molecules; response to amino acid; response to hypoxia; positive regulation of actin filament polymerization; response to organic cyclic compound; T cell antigen processing and presentation; establishment of Sertoli cell barrier; response to sulfur dioxide; response to copper ion; interferon-gamma-mediated signaling pathway; positive regulation of nitric oxide biosynthetic process; response to amphetamine; cellular response to tumor necrosis factor; regulation of leukocyte mediated cytotoxicity; T cell activation via T cell receptor contact with antigen bound to MHC molecule on antigen presenting cell; extracellular matrix organization; acute inflammatory response to antigenic stimulus; hearing; cellular response to alkaloid; response to gonadotropin; positive regulation of cellular extravasation; positive regulation of GTPase activity; response to lipopolysaccharide; regulation of cell adhesion; cell adhesion; cell adhesion mediated by integrin; positive regulation of NF-kappaB transcription factor activity; negative regulation of extrinsic apoptotic signaling pathway via death domain receptors; positive regulation of vasoconstriction; cellular response to interleukin-1; cellular response to nutrient levels; negative regulation of calcium ion transport; regulation of cell shape; membrane to membrane docking; positive regulation of peptidyl-tyrosine phosphorylation; ovarian follicle development; regulation of immune response; positive regulation of ERK1 and ERK2 cascade; regulation of ruffle assembly; viral entry into host cell; response to ethanol; viral process; cellular response to lipopolysaccharide; cellular response to hypoxia; leukocyte migration; cellular response to glucose stimulus; response to insulin; cellular response to interferon-gamma; cellular response to interleukin-6; cellular response to dexamethasone stimulus; establishment of endothelial intestinal barrier; positive regulation of leukocyte adhesion to vascular endothelial cell; cellular response to leukemia inhibitory factor; cell-cell adhesion; cytokine-mediated signaling pathway; T cell extravasation; cellular response to amyloid-beta
Sources:Amigo / QuickGO
Orthologs
Databases	NCBI: entry; OMA: entry
Species	Human	Mouse
Entrez	3383	15894
Ensembl	ENSG00000090339	ENSMUSG00000037405
UniProt	P05362	P13597
RefSeq (mRNA)	NM_000201	NM_010493
RefSeq (protein)	NP_000192	NP_034623
Location (UCSC)	Chr 19: 10.27 – 10.29 Mb	Chr 9: 20.93 – 20.94 Mb
PubMed search
- Wikidata
View/Edit Human	View/Edit Mouse

ICAM-1 (intercellular adhesion molecule 1) also known as CD54 (Cluster of Differentiation 54) is a protein that in humans is encoded by the ICAM1 gene. This gene encodes a cell surface glycoprotein which is typically expressed on endothelial cells and cells of the immune system. It binds to integrins of type CD11a / CD18, or CD11b / CD18 and is also exploited by rhinovirus as a receptor for entry into respiratory epithelium.

== Structure ==
ICAM-1 is a member of the immunoglobulin superfamily, the superfamily of proteins including antibodies and T-cell receptors. ICAM-1 is a transmembrane protein possessing an amino-terminus extracellular domain, a single transmembrane domain, and a carboxy-terminus cytoplasmic domain. The structure of ICAM-1 is characterized by heavy glycosylation, and the protein’s extracellular domain is composed of multiple loops created by disulfide bridges within the protein. The dominant secondary structure of the protein is the beta sheet, leading researchers to hypothesize the presence of dimerization domains within ICAM-1.

== Function ==
The protein encoded by this gene is a type of intercellular adhesion molecule continuously present in low concentrations in the membranes of leukocytes and endothelial cells. Upon cytokine stimulation, the concentrations greatly increase. ICAM-1 can be induced by interleukin-1 (IL-1) and tumor necrosis factor (TNF) and is expressed by the vascular endothelium, macrophages, and lymphocytes. ICAM-1 is a ligand for LFA-1 (integrin), a receptor found on leukocytes. When activated, leukocytes bind to endothelial cells via ICAM-1/LFA-1 and then transmigrate into tissues. LFA-1 has also been found in a soluble form, which seems to bind and block ICAM-1.

=== Role in cell signaling ===
ICAM-1 is an endothelial- and leukocyte-associated transmembrane protein long known for its importance in stabilizing cell-cell interactions and facilitating leukocyte endothelial transmigration. More recently, ICAM-1 has been characterized as a site for the cellular entry of human rhinovirus. Because of these associations with immune responses, it has been hypothesized that ICAM-1 could function in signal transduction. ICAM-1 ligation produces proinflammatory effects such as inflammatory leukocyte recruitment by signaling through cascades involving a number of kinases, including the kinase p56lyn.

=== Other functions ===
ICAM-1 and soluble ICAM-1 have antagonistic effects on the tight junctions forming the blood-testis barrier, thus playing a major role in spermatogenesis.

The presence of heavy glycosylation and other structural characteristics of ICAM-1 lend the protein binding sites for numerous ligands. ICAM-1 possesses binding sites for a number of immune-associated ligands. Notably, ICAM-1 binds to macrophage adhesion ligand-1 (Mac-1; ITGB2 / ITGAM), leukocyte function associated antigen-1 (LFA-1), and fibrinogen. These three proteins are generally expressed on endothelial cells and leukocytes, and they bind to ICAM-1 to facilitate transmigration of leukocytes across vascular endothelia in processes such as extravasation and the inflammatory response. As a result of these binding characteristics, ICAM-1 has classically been assigned the function of intercellular adhesion.

Researchers began to question the role of ICAM-1 as a simple adhesion molecule upon discovering that ICAM-1 serves as the binding site for entry of the major group of human rhinovirus (HRV) into various cell types. ICAM-1 also became known for its affinity for Plasmodium falciparum-infected erythrocytes (PFIE), acting synergistically in mediating adherence of PFIE to endothelium co-expressing CD36, providing more of a role for ICAM-1 in infectious disease.

With the roles of ICAM-1 in cell-cell adhesion, extravasation, and infection more fully understood, a potential role for ICAM-1 in signal transduction was hypothesized. Most of the work involving ICAM-1 in recent years has focused on this central question as well as related questions. Researchers reasoned that, should ICAM-1 signal transduction prove to occur, it would be necessary to identify the mechanism of that signaling, the conditions and environment in which the signaling would occur, and the biological endpoints of any signaling cascades involved. Beyond its classically described functions as an adhesion and viral entry molecule, ICAM-1 has now been characterized convincingly as possessing a role in signal transduction. Furthermore, the signal-transducing functions of ICAM-1 seem to be associated primarily with proinflammatory pathways. In particular, ICAM-1 signaling seems to produce a recruitment of inflammatory immune cells such as macrophages and granulocytes.

ICAM-1 may also participate in a positive feedback loop and compete with ICAM-2 to maintain a proinflammatory environment conducive to leukocyte endothelial transmigration. At both the mRNA and protein levels of expression, ICAM-1 ligation was found to upregulate ICAM-1’s own expression in a positive-feedback loop. In addition, the expression of RANTES mRNA and protein was also found to be upregulated by ICAM-1 ligation. RANTES, or Regulated upon Activation Normal T-cell Expressed and Secreted, is a cytokine that is an inflammatory mediator chemotactic for a variety of inflammatory immune cells such as granulocytes and macrophages. However, much work remains to be done in fully characterizing the signaling of ICAM-1. The relationship between ICAM-1 and ICAM-2 signaling environments has not been established beyond mere correlation; a study linking ICAM signaling to actual modulation of an inflammatory environment in vivo has yet to be conducted. The reticular nature of signaling cascades necessitates that the downstream effectors of ICAM-1 mediated signaling through various kinases including p56lyn, Raf-1, and the MAPKs are largely unknown. A more thorough study of the cross-talk between these signaling molecules may shed further light onto the biological endpoints produced by ICAM-1 ligation and signal transduction.

== Clinical significance ==
ICAM-1 has been implicated in subarachnoid hemorrhage (SAH). Levels of ICAM-1 are shown to be significantly elevated in patients with SAH over control subjects in many studies. While ICAM-1 has not been shown to be directly correlated with cerebral vasospasm, a secondary symptom that affects 70% of SAH patients, treatment with anti-ICAM-1 reduced the severity of vasospasm.

ICAM-1 expressed by respiratory epithelial cells is also the binding site for rhinovirus, the causative agent of most common colds.

ICAM-1 has an important role in ocular allergies recruiting pro-inflammatory lymphocytes and mast cells promoting a type I hypersensitivity reaction.

ICAM-1 is the primary entry receptor for Coxsackievirus A21, an oncolytic virus (brand name Cavatak, being developed by Viralytics).

Cannabinoid CB2 receptor agonists have been found to decrease the induction of ICAM-1 and VCAM-1 surface expression in human brain tissues and primary human brain endothelial cells (BMVEC) exposed to various pro-inflammatory mediators.

== Interactions ==
ICAM-1 has been shown to interact with CD11a, EZR and CD18.
