= George Rathmann =

American chemist and biologist (1927–2012)

George Blatz Rathmann (1927–2012) was an American chemist, biologist, pioneer in biotechnology and corporate executive. In 1980 he co-founded and served as the first CEO of Amgen, and later founded Icos.

== Background ==
Rathmann was born on December 25, 1927, in Milwaukee, Wisconsin. His mother was Edna Blatz, from the family who ran the Valentin Blatz Brewing Company. His father was Louis Rathmann, who worked in various local businesses. He was drawn to science and was inspired by an older brother and brother-in-law who were chemists, and by Mr. Leker, his high school chemistry teacher at Milwaukee University School (where his grandfather had taught years before). He had originally planned to attend medical school, before switching to physical chemistry and obtained a B.S. degree in physical chemistry at Northwestern University in three years, then earning a Ph.D. at Princeton in 1951, by which time he had already been recruited by 3M as a research chemist, where he worked for twenty-one years, helping develop Scotchgard and rising from scientist to corporate manager.

== Leaving 3M ==
Rathmann left 3M in 1972 to become president of Litton Medical Systems, but was dis-satisfied and left in 1975 to join Abbott Laboratories as vice president of research and development in the diagnostics division. At Abbott, Rathmann became interested in recombinant DNA and other aspects of biotechnology, and was recruited in 1980 by venture capitalists to help found Amgen, where he would serve as chairman, president and CEO.

In 1983, Rathmann joined the board of directors of the newly formed Biotechnology Industry Organization, and served as its chairman from 1987 to 1988.

In 1990, Rathmann left Amgen to start Icos, a biotechnology company in the Seattle area. While at Icos, he raised the largest-ever-to-date private offering for a biotechnology company. The offering included an investment from Bill Gates, Gates' first investment in biotechnology. Rathmann left the company in February 2000, and was replaced as CEO and chairman by Paul Clark, a former executive at Abbott, under whom Icos would decline and eventually be sold off to Eli Lilly.

Rathmann received the first of the Biotechnology Heritage Awards from the Biotechnology Industry Organization (BIO) and the Chemical Heritage Foundation in 1999 in recognition of his career as a scientist and entrepreneur. In 2000, he endowed a professorship at Northwestern, held by Chad Mirkin.

He died on April 22, 2012, in Palo Alto, California, from kidney failure.

== Awards and honors ==
- 1987 and 1988, CEO of the year in 1987 and 1988 by the Biotechnology Industry Organization (BIO)
- 1992, BioPharm Achievement Award
- 1995, Glenn Seaborg Medal from the University of California-Los Angeles
- 1997, Bower Award for Business Leadership at the Franklin Institute in Philadelphia
- 1999, Biotechnology Heritage Award, given by the Chemical Heritage Foundation and BIO
- 2000, Golden Plate Award of the American Academy of Achievement
- 2001, James Madison Medal from Princeton University

On behalf of Amgen, he also received the Gift of Life Award from the Illinois Chapter of the National Kidney Foundation and the Annual Recognition Award from the Washington D.C. National Kidney Foundation
