= GDP-fucose transporter 1 =

Protein-coding gene in the species Homo sapiens

SLC35C1

Identifiers
- Aliases: SLC35C1, CDG2C, FUCT1, solute carrier family 35 member C1
- External IDs: OMIM: 605881; MGI: 2443301; GeneCards: SLC35C1

Gene location (Human)
| Chr. | Chromosome 11 (human) |
| Band | 11p11.2 | Start | 45,804,072 bp |
| Band | 11p11.2 | End | 45,813,016 bp |

Gene location (Mouse)
| Chr. | Chromosome 2 (mouse) |
| Band | 2|2 E1 | Start | 92,283,109 bp |
| Band | 2|2 E1 | End | 92,290,883 bp |
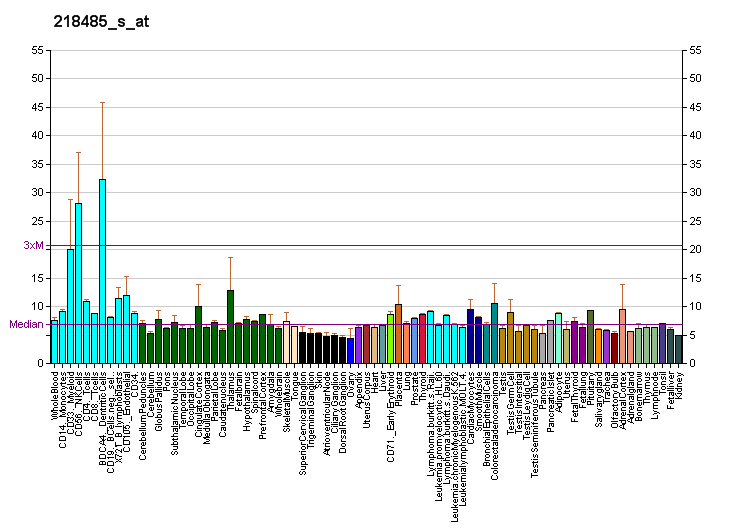
RNA expression pattern
| Bgee | Human / Mouse (ortholog); Top expressed in: right lobe of liver; mucosa of transverse colon; minor salivary glands; stromal cell of endometrium; mucosa of pharynx; mucosa of ileum; subcutaneous adipose tissue; buccal mucosa cell; granulocyte; gonad / Top expressed in: colon; left colon; pyloric antrum; epithelium of stomach; lacrimal gland; crypt of lieberkuhn of small intestine; yolk sac; granulocyte; duodenum; mucous cell of stomach; More reference expression data |
| BioGPS | More reference expression data |
Gene ontology
| Molecular function | GDP-fucose transmembrane transporter activity; antiporter activity; transmembrane transporter activity |
| Cellular component | integral component of membrane; Golgi membrane; Golgi apparatus; membrane |
| Biological process | lipid glycosylation; negative regulation of Notch signaling pathway; carbohydrate transport; GDP-fucose import into Golgi lumen; protein O-linked fucosylation |
Sources:Amigo / QuickGO
Orthologs
| Databases | NCBI: entry; OMA: entry |
| Species | Human | Mouse |
| Entrez | 55343 | 228368 |
| Ensembl | ENSG00000181830 | ENSMUSG00000049922 |
| UniProt | Q96A29 | Q8BLX4 |
| RefSeq (mRNA) | NM_001145265; NM_001145266; NM_018389 | NM_145832; NM_211358 |
| RefSeq (protein) | NP_001138737; NP_001138738; NP_060859 | NP_665831; NP_997597 |
| Location (UCSC) | Chr 11: 45.8 – 45.81 Mb | Chr 2: 92.28 – 92.29 Mb |
| PubMed search |
- Wikidata
| View/Edit Human | View/Edit Mouse |

GDP-fucose transporter 1 is a protein that in humans is encoded by the SLC35C1 gene.

Defects can be associated with Congenital disorder of glycosylation type IIc.

== See also ==
- Solute carrier family
- EamA
