= Integrin alpha M =

Mammalian protein found in Homo sapiens

ITGAM
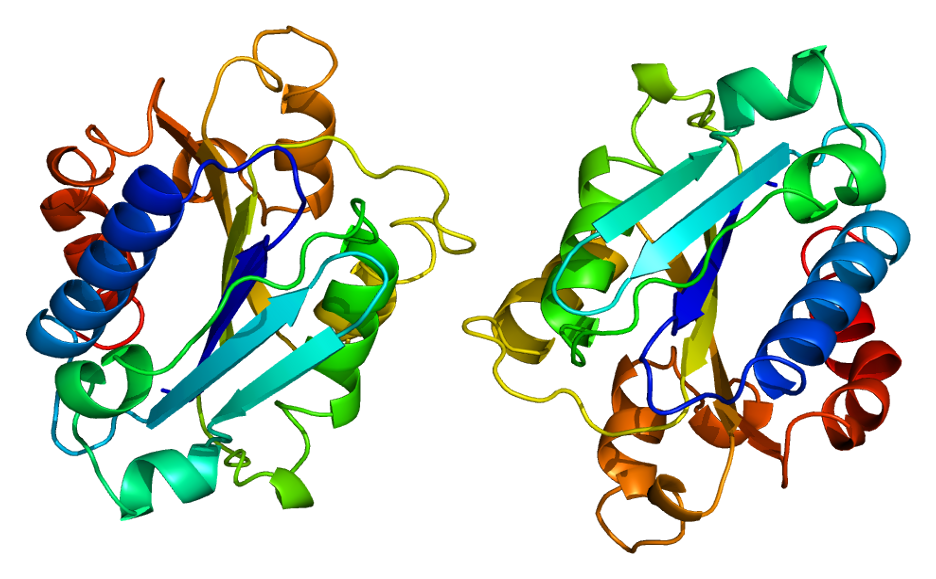

Identifiers
- Aliases: ITGAM, CD11B, CR3A, MAC-1, MAC1A, MO1A, SLEB6, integrin subunit alpha M
- External IDs: OMIM: 120980; MGI: 96607; GeneCards: ITGAM
Available structures
PDB	Ortholog search: PDBe RCSB
PDB	List of PDB id codes 1BHO, 1BHQ, 1IDN, 1IDO, 1JLM, 1M1U, 1MF7, 1N9Z, 1NA5, 2LKE, 2LKJ, 3Q3G, 3QA3, 4M76, 4XW2

Gene location (Human)
Chr.	Chromosome 16 (human)
Band	16p11.2	Start	31,259,967 bp
Band	16p11.2	End	31,332,892 bp

Gene location (Mouse)
Chr.	Chromosome 7 (mouse)
Band	7|7 F3	Start	127,661,812 bp
Band	7|7 F3	End	127,717,663 bp
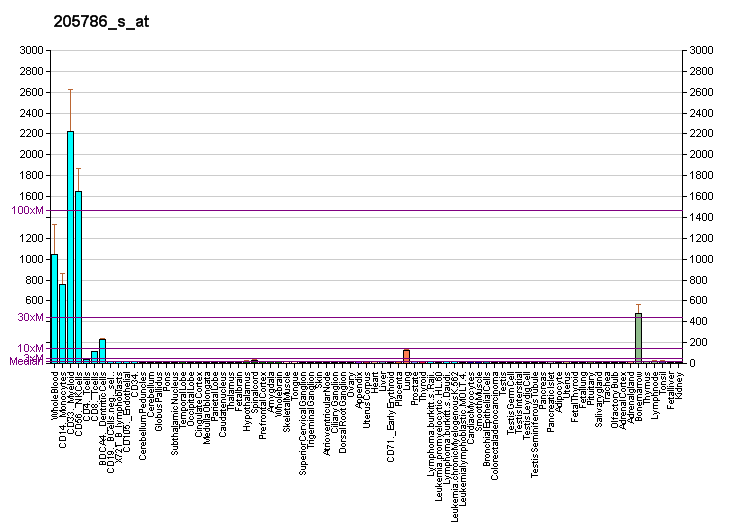
RNA expression pattern
Bgee	Human / Mouse (ortholog); Top expressed in: monocyte; granulocyte; trabecular bone; bone marrow; blood; bone marrow cell; spleen; appendix; upper lobe of left lung; decidua / Top expressed in: granulocyte; bone marrow; ileum; jejunum; spleen; dentate gyrus of hippocampal formation granule cell; hippocampus proper; esophagus; striatum of neuraxis; uterus; More reference expression data
BioGPS	More reference expression data
Gene ontology
Molecular function	metal ion binding; protein binding; protein heterodimerization activity; heat shock protein binding; amyloid-beta binding; complement component C3b binding; cargo receptor activity
Cellular component	extracellular exosome; plasma membrane; cell surface; membrane; integral component of membrane; integrin complex; extracellular space; specific granule membrane; tertiary granule membrane; external side of plasma membrane; integrin alphaM-beta2 complex; plasma membrane raft; membrane raft
Biological process	ectodermal cell differentiation; toll-like receptor 4 signaling pathway; integrin-mediated signaling pathway; leukocyte migration; extracellular matrix organization; cell adhesion; neutrophil degranulation; microglial cell activation; immune system process; receptor-mediated endocytosis; phagocytosis, engulfment; cytokine-mediated signaling pathway; positive regulation of superoxide anion generation; positive regulation of neutrophil degranulation; innate immune response; negative regulation of dopamine metabolic process; positive regulation of protein targeting to membrane; amyloid-beta clearance; cell-cell adhesion via plasma-membrane adhesion molecules; complement-mediated synapse pruning; vertebrate eye-specific patterning; positive regulation of neuron death; positive regulation of microglial cell activation; positive regulation of microglial cell mediated cytotoxicity; cell surface receptor signaling pathway involved in cell-cell signaling; positive regulation of prostaglandin-E synthase activity; forebrain development; apoptotic signaling pathway; positive regulation of hippocampal neuron apoptotic process
Sources:Amigo / QuickGO
Orthologs
Databases	NCBI: entry; OMA: entry
Species	Human	Mouse
Entrez	3684	16409
Ensembl	ENSG00000169896	ENSMUSG00000030786
UniProt	P11215	P05555
RefSeq (mRNA)	NM_000632; NM_001145808	NM_001082960; NM_008401
RefSeq (protein)	NP_000623; NP_001139280	n/a
Location (UCSC)	Chr 16: 31.26 – 31.33 Mb	Chr 7: 127.66 – 127.72 Mb
PubMed search
- Wikidata
View/Edit Human	View/Edit Mouse

Integrin alpha M (ITGAM) is one protein subunit that forms heterodimeric integrin alpha-M beta-2 (α_{M}β_{2}) molecule, also known as macrophage-1 antigen (Mac-1) or complement receptor 3 (CR3). ITGAM is also known as CR3A and cluster of differentiation molecule 11B (CD11B). The second chain of α_{M}β_{2} is the common integrin β_{2} subunit known as CD18, and integrin α_{M}β_{2} thus belongs to the β_{2} subfamily (or leukocyte) integrins.

α_{M}β_{2} is expressed on the surface of many leukocytes involved in the innate immune system, including monocytes, granulocytes, macrophages, and natural killer cells and subsets of T and B cells. It mediates inflammation by regulating leukocyte adhesion and migration and has been implicated in several immune processes such as phagocytosis, cell-mediated cytotoxicity, chemotaxis and cellular activation. It is involved in the complement system due to its capacity to bind inactivated complement component 3b (iC3b). The ITGAM (alpha) subunit of integrin α_{M}β_{2} is directly involved in causing the adhesion and spreading of cells but cannot mediate cellular migration without the presence of the β2 (CD18) subunit.

In genome-wide association studies, single nucleotide polymorphisms in ITGAM had the strongest association with systemic lupus erythematosus, with an odds ratio of 1.65 for the T allele of rs9888739 and lupus.

In histopathology, immunohistochemistry with antibodies against CD11B is frequently used to identify macrophages and microglia.

== Function ==
CD11b, as an integrin molecule on the surface of leukocytes, plays an important role in cell migration, adhesion, and transmigration across blood vessels, because it can bind to components of extracellular matrix and intracellular adhesion molecules (ICAMs) on the endothelial surface. This process is important for leukocyte recruitment into the site of inflammation.

Moreover, there are other important processes with CD11b involvement, more precisely Mac-1 integrin involvement as a whole. One of which is phagocytosis of opsonised particles by a complement component iC3b. Such opsonised particles could be bacteria, apoptotic cells, and even immune complexes. CD11b binding to iC3b leads to a production of anti-inflammatory cytokines, e.g., interleukin 10 (IL-10) and tumour growth factor beta (TGFβ). This process is important for regulation of the inflammatory milieu.

CD11b is also involved in the differentiation of osteoclasts, bone remodelling cells. Mac-1 is expressed in osteoclast progenitors, and it seems that it is a part of a negative feedback of osteoclastogenesis. CD11b also modulates other functions of leukocytes, e.g. oxidative burst, apoptosis, binding of fibrinogen etc.

On circulating leukocytes, CD11b is expressed in a closed conformation. The switch into an active conformation follows quickly after the stimulation of toll-like receptors (TLR) of the leukocytes. Once activated, CD11b can bind its ligands with high affinity, e.g., binding of ICAM-2 molecules on TLR signalling in the cell. TLR stimulation results in the production of pro-inflammatory cytokines, e.g., IL-6 and IL-1β, via a series of phosphorylation of signalling factors, one of which is the NF-κB transcription factor. This signalling is in fact negatively affected by CD11b signalling. Consequently, this leads to a reduced activation of NF-κB and lower production of above-mentioned pro-inflammatory cytokines. To conclude, CD11b signalling negatively regulates leukocyte activation after TLR stimulation. Beside TLR signalling, CD11b also negatively regulates B cell receptor (BCR) signalling, and it suppresses T cell activation and dendritic cell maturation and function.

== Therapeutic significance ==
CD11b plays an important role in immune cell regulation. Once this regulation is disrupted, it may lead to a higher susceptibility to inflammatory and autoimmune diseases. Some examples would be systemic lupus erythematosus (SLE), lupus nephritis and certain types of cancer.

=== Systemic lupus erythematosus ===
Genome-wide association studies helped to uncover three main single nucleotide polymorphisms (SNPs) in CD11b, that are associated with the risk of developing SLE, cardiovascular disease, and lupus nephritis (a complication usually occurring along with SLE). These SNPs are: rs1143679 (R77H), rs1143678 (P1146S), and rs1143683 (A858V) and they result in the lower ability of CD11b to properly bind iC3b, thus decreased cell adhesion and phagocytosis. Reduced ability to negatively regulate the production of pro-inflammatory cytokines IL-6, IL-1β, and tumour necrosis factor α (TNFα) after TLR stimulation have been also observed in these mutations.

CD11b plays a protective role during SLE and lupus nephritis owing to its anti-inflammatory properties. Lupus nephritis is characterised by the accumulation of immune complexes in kidneys and overall immune infiltration into kidneys, which results in renal damage. This debilitating complication of SLE is associated with the above-mentioned mutations in CD11b. Patients with ITGAM SNPs have higher serum levels of interferon type I (IFN-I), which is one of the risk factors for developing SLE and lupus nephritis. Moreover, higher levels of other pro-inflammatory cytokines IL-6, IL-1β and TNFα after TLR stimulation, observed in patients with ITGAM SNPs, further drive the inflammation during this disease causing more tissue damage and creation of immune complexes.

Hence, CD11b represents a possible therapeutic target for the treatment of SLE. Indeed, many attempts to target CD11b have been made, including antibody-based therapy which proved to be ineffective in the case of CD11b. However, other therapies using small allosteric CD11b agonists seem to be a promising tool as their activation of CD11b leads to a regulation of TLR-dependent pro-inflammatory pathways and protection from renal damage.

=== Tumours ===
CD11b seems to be a potent player in managing certain types of solid tumours. Even though nowadays many tools for cancer treatment exist, multiple factors of this illness remain a challenging topic. One of them are myeloid-derived suppressor cells (MDSC) and tumour-associated macrophages (TAMs), which are myeloid cells present in the tumour microenvironment possessing suppressor properties, thus favouring the tumour growth. TAMs, however, do not have only tumour-promoting properties, they can also display tumour-inhibiting properties. It depends on their stimulation. The tumour-inhibiting properties include the production of pro-inflammatory cytokines and the ability to present antigens.

Using CD11b agonists seems to be of importance in tumour treatment. Agonist that stabilize CD11b in its active conformation result in higher adhesion of CD11b to its endothelial ligands, consequently impair the ability of transendothelial migration to the site of inflammation. Such agonist therapy is under development and one promising candidate, GB1275, is currently in its first clinical phase at the beginning of 2023. This agonist of CD11b shows impaired transmigration of suppressive TAMs into the site of TAMs towards pro-inflammatory phenotype with higher antigen presentation and production of pro-inflammatory cytokines. Therefore, promising better tumour inhibition.

== See also ==
- Integrin
