= PDL BioPharma =

- Company type: Public
- Traded as: Nasdaq: PDLI; Russell 2000 Component
- Industry: Biotechnology
- Headquarters: Incline Village, United States
- Key people: John McLaughlin (CEO) Peter Garcia (CFO); Cary Queen (Founder, former vice-president in charge of research) Laurence J. Korn (Founder, former president)
- Revenue: $590.4 million (2015)
- Website: pdl.com

PDL BioPharma (known as Protein Design Labs prior to 2006) is a publicly traded American holding company that since 2008 manages patents and other intellectual property that had been generated by the company. In 2008 in response to shareholder pressure, PDL spun out its active development programs to a company called Facet Biotech that it capitalized with $400 million.

Protein Design Labs, founded in 1986 by cell biologist Laurence J. Korn and mathematician Cary Queen, was a pioneer in humanizing monoclonal antibodies. Its humanization technology was used in several monoclonal antibody drugs under licensing and collaboration agreements; such products included trastuzumab (Herceptin), bevacizumab (Avastin), and palivizumab (Synagis). It held its initial public offering in 1992 and by 1994 it had 13 compounds in its pipeline, and had partnered its lead product, the humanized monoclonal antibody daclizumab, with Roche under a license that called for a 15% royalty. Daclizumab became the first humanized monoclonal antibody approved for human use in 1997. PDL made another public offering in 2000, at the peak of the biotech IPO window that ran from 1998 to 2001. In 2003 it settled litigation with Genentech over royalty payments owed to PDL under their license agreement; annual royalties were anticipated at that time to be around $90M per year. These are the kinds of intellectual property and license agreements that PDL manages on behalf of its shareholders since 2008; in 2007 those royalty payments were around $220 million.

One of the development programs that PDL had transferred to Facet was the use of daclizumab in indications it had never licensed to Roche, including multiple sclerosis. Facet partnered that development program with Biogen Idec which attempted a hostile buy out of Facet for $350M in 2009; Facet rejected that offer and was purchased by Abbvie for $450 million in cash the next year. The FDA approved daclizumab for multiple sclerosis in 2016 under the trade name Zinbryta.

PDL Biopharma has filed for a liquidation under Delaware Law that was effective January 7, 2021. The liquidation plan was approved by shareholders in October 2020.
