= Macrophage-1 antigen =

Macrophage-1 antigen (or integrin α_{M}β_{2} or macrophage integrin or Mac-1) is an integrin complement receptor ("CR3") consisting of CD11b (integrin α_{M}) and CD18 (integrin β_{2}).

The integrin α chain is noncovalently bound to the integrin β chain. It binds to iC3b and can be involved in cellular adhesion, binding to the intercellular adhesion molecule-1 (ICAM-1). CR3 causes phagocytosis and destruction of cells opsonized with iC3b. CR3 and CR4 are thought to exhibit overlapping functions; however, the distinct binding sites to iC3b suggests differences in their functions. Additionally, CR3 has been shown to have therapeutic promise.

== Function ==
Macrophage-1 antigen (hereafter complement receptor 3 or CR3) (CD11b/CD18) is a human cell surface receptor found on B and T lymphocytes, polymorphonuclear leukocytes (mostly neutrophils), NK cells, and mononuclear phagocytes like macrophages. CR3 is a pattern recognition receptor, capable of recognizing and binding to many molecules found on the surfaces of invading bacteria. CR3 also recognizes iC3b when bound to the surface of foreign cells. iC3b is generated by proteolysis of C3b and binding to the receptor causes phagocytosis and destruction of the foreign cell opsonized with iC3b.

CR3 belongs to a family of cell surface receptors known as integrins (because they share this particular β chain, they are referred to as β2-integrins), which are extremely widely distributed throughout nature and which generally are important in cellular adhesion, migration, phagocytosis and other cell-cell interactions in a variety of cells and circumstances.

Upregulation of CR3 in the presence of certain factors such as IL-2 may cause a prolongation of the life of the immune cell while the presence of TNF-α induces apoptosis and selective removal of the cell.

A fully activated neutrophil may express on its membrane 200,000 or more CR3 molecules.

Absence of CR3 results in reduced binding and ingestion of Mycobacterium tuberculosis in mice. In human mononuclear phagocytes, phagocytosis of Mycobacterium tuberculosis is mediated in part by human monocyte complement receptors including CR3.

CR3 has also been shown to mediate phagocytosis of the Lyme disease causing bacterium, Borrelia burgdorferi, in the absence of iC3b opsonization.

== CR3 and CR4 ==
CR3 (integrin α_{M}β_{2}) and CR4 (integrin α_{X}β_{2}, composed of CD11c and CD18), both members of the β2-integrin family, are generally thought to exhibit overlapping functions in myeloid cells and certain lymphoid populations. CR3 and CR4 have been shown to be 87% homologous via sequence analysis of human cDNA of the α chains; however, the complement receptors bind at distinct sites of iC3b and the intracellular domains differ in length and amino acid sequence, suggesting further differences in their functions. Further, CR3 favors binding to positively charged species, while CR4 binds negatively charged species. It has been shown that both CR3 and CR4 are found in mice and humans. Together, CR3 and CR4 are involved in various functions of the T and B lymphocytes and NK cells. For instance, while both CR3 and CR4 are involved in adhesion, migration and proliferation of B cells, they are involved in enhancing complement-dependent cytotoxicity in NK cells.

== CR3 and CR4 for Disease Therapy ==
Immunomodulatory therapies often aim for an induced reduction of symptoms in inflammatory disease or supported elimination of malignancies. In vitro and in vivo experiments suggest a response of CR3 and CR4 to enable complement-dependent cell cytotoxicity towards antibody-coated cancer cells. Such biological therapeutic targeting is characterized by lowering autoimmune inflammation or enhancing anti-cancer vaccination effects.

Leukadherin-1, a CR3 agonist molecule, has been shown to suppress human innate inflammatory signals. Its anti-inflammatory effect mediation further provides support for its therapeutic promise in animal models of vascular injury.

== Synonyms and abbreviations ==
- CR3
- CD11b/CD18
- Macrophage 1 antigen (Mac-1)

== See also ==
- Macrophage
