= Lymphocyte function-associated antigen 1 =

Integrin found on lymphocytes

Lymphocyte function-associated antigen 1 (LFA-1) is an integrin found on lymphocytes and other leukocytes. LFA-1 plays a key role in emigration, which is the process by which leukocytes leave the bloodstream to enter the tissues. LFA-1 also mediates firm arrest of leukocytes. Additionally, LFA-1 is involved in the process of cytotoxic T cell mediated killing as well as antibody mediated killing by granulocytes and monocytes. As of 2007, LFA-1 has 6 known ligands: ICAM-1, ICAM-2, ICAM-3, ICAM-4, ICAM-5, and JAM-A. LFA-1/ICAM-1 interactions have recently been shown to stimulate signaling pathways that influence T cell differentiation. LFA-1 belongs to the integrin superfamily of adhesion molecules.

== Structure ==
LFA-1 is a heterodimeric glycoprotein with non-covalently linked subunits. LFA-1 has two subunits designated as the alpha subunit and beta subunit. The alpha subunit was named aL in 1983. The alpha subunit is designated CD11a; and the beta subunit, unique to leukocytes, is beta-2 or CD18. The ICAM binding site is on the alpha subunit. The general binding region of the alpha subunit is the I-domain. Due to the presence of a divalent cation site in the I-domain, the specific binding site is often referred to as the metal-ion dependent adhesion site (MIDAS).

== Activation ==
In an inactive state, LFA-1 rests in a bent conformation and has a low affinity for ICAM binding. This bent conformation conceals the MIDAS. Chemokines stimulate the activation process of LFA-1. The activation process begins with the activation of Rap1, an intracellular g-protein. Rap1 assists in breaking the constraint between the alpha and beta subunits of LFA-1. This induces an intermediate extended conformation. The conformational change stimulates a recruitment of proteins to form an activation complex. The activation complex further destabilizes the alpha and beta subunits. Chemokines also stimulate an I-like domain on the beta subunit, which causes the MIDAS site on the beta subunit to bind to glutamate on the I domain of the alpha subunit. This binding process causes the beta subunit to pull down the alpha 7 helix of the I domain, exposing and opening up the MIDAS site on the alpha subunit for binding. This causes LFA-1 to undergo a conformational change to the fully extended conformation. The process of activating LFA-1 is known as inside out signaling, which causes LFA-1 to shift from low affinity to high affinity by opening the ligand-binding site.

== Discovery ==
Early discovery of cellular adhesion molecules involved the use of monoclonal antibodies to inhibit cellular adhesion processes. The antigen that bound to the monoclonal antibodies was identified as an important molecule in cellular recognition processes. These experiments yielded the protein name “integrin” as a description of the proteins' integral role in cellular adhesion processes and the transmembrane association between the extracellular matrix and the cytoskeleton. LFA-1, a leukocyte integrin, was first discovered by Timothy Springer in mice in the 1980s.

== Leukocyte Adhesion Deficiency (LAD) ==
Leukocyte adhesion deficiency is an immunodeficiency caused by the absence of key adhesion surface proteins, including LFA-1. LAD is a genetic defect caused by autosomal recessive genes. The deficiency causes ineffective migration and phagocytosis for impacted leukocytes. Patients with LAD also have poorly functioning neutrophils. LAD1, a subtype of LAD, is caused by a lack of integrins that contain the beta subunit, including LFA-1. LAD1 is characterized by recurring bacterial infection, delayed (>30 days) separation of umbilical cord, ineffective wound healing and pus formation, and granulocytosis. LAD1 is caused by low expression of CD11 and CD18. CD18 is found on chromosome 21 and CD11 is found on chromosome 16.

== See also ==
- Leukocyte adhesion deficiency
- Lifitegrast, a drug that blocks LFA-1 from binding to ICAM-1
