= Integrin beta 2 =

Mammalian protein found in Homo sapiens

ITGB2
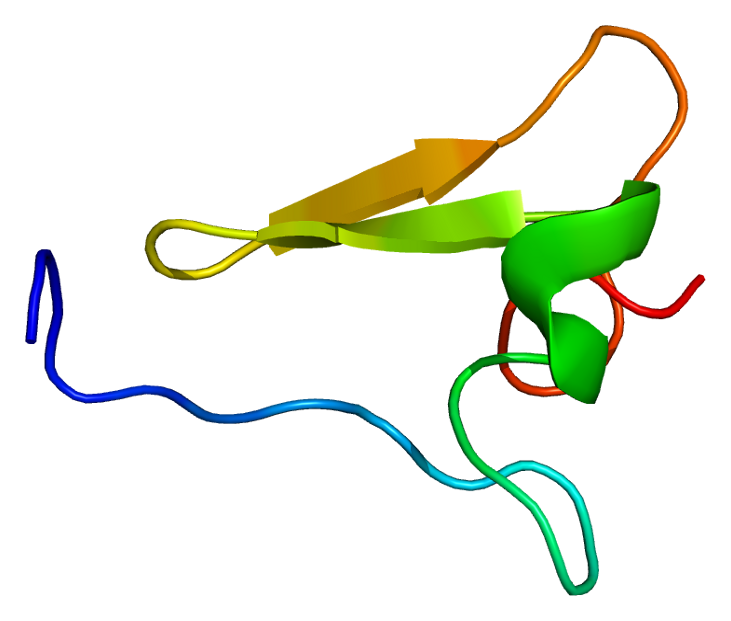

Identifiers
- Aliases: ITGB2, CD18, LAD, LCAMB, LFA-1, MAC-1, MF17, MFI7, integrin subunit beta 2
- External IDs: OMIM: 600065; MGI: 96611; GeneCards: ITGB2
Available structures
PDB	Ortholog search: PDBe RCSB
PDB	List of PDB id codes 1L3Y, 1YUK, 2JF1, 2P26, 2P28, 3K6S, 3K71, 3K72, 2V7D, 4NEH, 4NEN, 5E6X, 5E6V, 5E6S, 5E6R, 5E6W, 5ES4, 5E6U

Gene location (Human)
Chr.	Chromosome 21 (human)
Band	21q22.3	Start	44,885,953 bp
Band	21q22.3	End	44,931,989 bp

Gene location (Mouse)
Chr.	Chromosome 10 (mouse)
Band	10 C1|10 39.72 cM	Start	77,366,086 bp
Band	10 C1|10 39.72 cM	End	77,401,542 bp
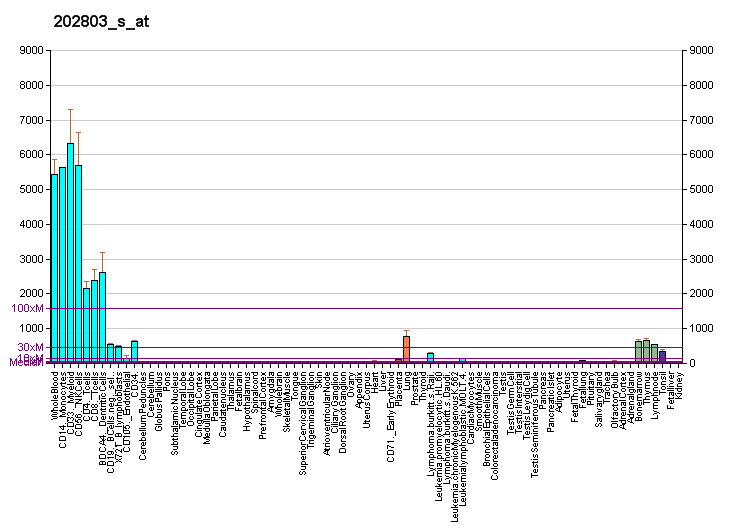
RNA expression pattern
Bgee	Human / Mouse (ortholog); Top expressed in: granulocyte; monocyte; blood; spleen; bone marrow cell; appendix; trabecular bone; lymph node; right lung; upper lobe of left lung / Top expressed in: granulocyte; stroma of bone marrow; tibiofemoral joint; spleen; thymus; mesenteric lymph nodes; blood; right lung lobe; ankle joint; subcutaneous adipose tissue; More reference expression data
BioGPS	More reference expression data
Gene ontology
Molecular function	protein-containing complex binding; metal ion binding; protein binding; protein heterodimerization activity; ICAM-3 receptor activity; protein kinase binding; cell adhesion molecule binding; heat shock protein binding; amyloid-beta binding; complement component C3b binding; integrin binding; signaling receptor activity; cargo receptor activity
Cellular component	integral component of membrane; extracellular vesicle; integrin alphaL-beta2 complex; membrane; plasma membrane; receptor complex; cell surface; integrin complex; extracellular exosome; specific granule membrane; tertiary granule membrane; ficolin-1-rich granule membrane; focal adhesion; external side of plasma membrane; integrin alphaM-beta2 complex; plasma membrane raft; membrane raft; cytoplasmic region; protein-containing complex
Biological process	leukocyte cell-cell adhesion; endodermal cell differentiation; toll-like receptor 4 signaling pathway; positive regulation of nitric oxide biosynthetic process; heterotypic cell-cell adhesion; cell-cell signaling; ageing; receptor internalization; leukocyte migration involved in inflammatory response; natural killer cell activation; cellular response to low-density lipoprotein particle stimulus; extracellular matrix organization; receptor clustering; positive regulation of angiogenesis; neutrophil chemotaxis; cell adhesion; positive regulation of NF-kappaB transcription factor activity; regulation of cell shape; regulation of immune response; cellular extravasation; integrin-mediated signaling pathway; cell-matrix adhesion; inflammatory response; endothelial cell migration; leukocyte migration; regulation of peptidyl-tyrosine phosphorylation; apoptotic process; phagocytosis; neutrophil degranulation; microglial cell activation; receptor-mediated endocytosis; phagocytosis, engulfment; cell migration; cytokine-mediated signaling pathway; positive regulation of superoxide anion generation; cell adhesion mediated by integrin; positive regulation of neutrophil degranulation; negative regulation of dopamine metabolic process; positive regulation of protein targeting to membrane; amyloid-beta clearance; cell-cell adhesion; cell-cell adhesion via plasma-membrane adhesion molecules; positive regulation of neuron death; positive regulation of microglial cell activation; neutrophil migration; positive regulation of prostaglandin-E synthase activity; positive regulation of leukocyte adhesion to vascular endothelial cell
Sources:Amigo / QuickGO
Orthologs
Databases	NCBI: entry; OMA: entry
Species	Human	Mouse
Entrez	3689	16414
Ensembl	ENSG00000160255	ENSMUSG00000000290
UniProt	P05107	P11835
RefSeq (mRNA)	NM_000211; NM_001127491; NM_001303238	NM_008404
RefSeq (protein)	NP_000202; NP_001120963; NP_001290167	NP_032430
Location (UCSC)	Chr 21: 44.89 – 44.93 Mb	Chr 10: 77.37 – 77.4 Mb
PubMed search
- Wikidata
View/Edit Human	View/Edit Mouse

In molecular biology, CD18 (Integrin beta chain-2) is an integrin beta chain protein that is encoded by the ITGB2 gene in humans. Upon binding with one of a number of alpha chains, CD18 is capable of forming multiple heterodimers, which play significant roles in cellular adhesion and cell surface signaling, as well as important roles in immune responses. CD18 also exists in soluble, ligand binding forms. Genetically-inherited deficiencies in the ITGB2 gene can lead to reduced surface expression of the CD18 protein, leading to the immunodeficiency leukocyte adhesion deficiency.

== Structure and function ==
The ITGB2 protein product is CD18. Integrins are integral cell-surface proteins composed of an alpha chain and a beta chain, and are crucial for cells to be able to efficiently bind to the extracellular matrix. This is especially important for neutrophils, as cellular adhesion plays a large role in extravasation from the blood vessels. A given chain may combine with multiple partners resulting in different integrins.

The known binding partners of CD18 are CD11a, CD11b, CD11c and CD11d. Binding of CD18 and CD11a results in the formation of lymphocyte function-associated antigen-1 (LFA-1), a protein found on B cells, all T cells, monocytes, neutrophils and NK cells. LFA-1 is involved in adhesion and binding to antigen presenting cells through interactions with the surface protein ICAM-1.

Binding of CD18 and CD11b-d results in the formation of complement receptors (e.g. Macrophage-1 antigen receptor, Mac-1, when bound to CD11b), which are proteins found largely on neutrophils, macrophages and NK cells. These complement receptors participate in the innate immune response by recognizing foreign antigen peptides and phagocytizing them, thus destroying the antigen.

== Clinical significance ==
In humans, lack of functional CD18 causes leukocyte adhesion deficiency, a disease defined by a lack of leukocyte extravasation from blood into tissues, which is the inability of circulating leukocytes to respond to foreign bodies present in the tissue. This subsequently reduces the ability of the individual's immune system to fight off infection, making them more susceptible to foreign infection than those with functional CD18 proteins. The beta 2 integrins have also been found in a soluble form, meaning they are not anchored into the plasma membrane of the cell, but rather exist outside of the cell in the plasma, and are capable of ligand binding. The soluble beta 2 integrins are ligand binding and plasma levels are inversely associated with disease activity in the autoimmune disease spondyloarthritis.

== Interactions ==
CD18 has been shown to interact with:

- FHL2,
- GNB2L1,
- ICAM-1, and
- PSCD1.

== See also ==
- leukocyte adhesion deficiency
- integrin
