= Fc receptor-like molecule =

Class of proteins

Fc receptor-like molecules (FCRLs) are a class of proteins that resemble Fc receptors. They have been characterized in a number of species, including humans and mice. A subset of FCRLs are preferentially expressed by B lymphocytes. Unlike the classical Fc receptors, there is no strong evidence that suggests that FCRLs bind to the Fc portion of antibodies. Their function is unknown.

It has been indicated that FCRLs may be a unique marker for immune cells in the brain called microglia, compared to other CNS cells and peripheral immune cells.

== Members ==
- FCRL1
- FCRL2
- FCRL3
- FCRL4
- FCRL5
- FCRL6
- FCRLA. FCRLA associates with IgM, IgG and IgA.
- FCRLB

== See also ==
- Fc receptor
