= C1GALT1 =

Protein-coding gene in the species Homo sapiens

Identifiers
- Aliases: C1GALT1, C1GALT, T-synthase, core 1 synthase, glycoprotein-N-acetylgalactosamine 3-beta-galactosyltransferase 1
- External IDs: OMIM: 610555; MGI: 2151071; GeneCards: C1GALT1
Enzyme activity
EC #	BRENDA	ExPASy	KEGG	MetaCyc
2.4.1.122	↗	↗	↗	↗

Gene location (Human)
Chr.	Chromosome 7 (human)
Band	7p22.1-p21.3	Start	7,156,934 bp
Band	7p22.1-p21.3	End	7,248,616 bp

Gene location (Mouse)
Chr.	Chromosome 6 (mouse)
Band	6|6 A1	Start	7,844,842 bp
Band	6|6 A1	End	7,875,687 bp
RNA expression pattern
Bgee	Human / Mouse (ortholog); Top expressed in: amniotic fluid; secondary oocyte; corpus callosum; Epithelium of choroid plexus; pylorus; monocyte; kidney tubule; palpebral conjunctiva; C1 segment; gonad / Top expressed in: epithelium of stomach; left colon; transitional epithelium of urinary bladder; parotid gland; ascending aorta; molar; pyloric antrum; mucous cell of stomach; thymus; seminal vesicula; More reference expression data
BioGPS	n/a
Gene ontology
Molecular function	glycosyltransferase activity; transferase activity; glycoprotein-N-acetylgalactosamine 3-beta-galactosyltransferase activity; protein binding; metal ion binding
Cellular component	integral component of membrane; Golgi membrane; membrane
Biological process	multicellular organism development; protein glycosylation; cell differentiation; O-glycan processing, core 1; angiogenesis; intestinal epithelial cell development; kidney development; O-glycan processing; protein O-linked glycosylation
Sources:Amigo / QuickGO
Orthologs
Databases	NCBI: entry; OMA: entry
Species	Human	Mouse
Entrez	56913	94192
Ensembl	ENSG00000106392	ENSMUSG00000042460
UniProt	Q9NS00	Q9JJ06
RefSeq (mRNA)	NM_020156	NM_052993
RefSeq (protein)	NP_064541	NP_443719
Location (UCSC)	Chr 7: 7.16 – 7.25 Mb	Chr 6: 7.84 – 7.88 Mb
PubMed search
- Wikidata
View/Edit Human	View/Edit Mouse

core 1 synthase, glycoprotein-N-acetylgalactosamine 3-beta-galactosyltransferase, 1

Identifiers
- Symbol: C1GALT1
- NCBI gene: 56913
- HGNC: 24337
- OMIM: 610555
- RefSeq: NM_020156
- UniProt: Q9NS00

Other data
- EC number: 2.4.1.122
- Locus: Chr. 7 p21.3
Search for
- Structures: Swiss-model
- Domains: InterPro

Core 1 synthase, glycoprotein-N-acetylgalactosamine 3-beta-galactosyltransferase, 1, also known as C1GALT1, is an enzyme which in humans is encoded by the C1GALT1 gene.

== Function ==
The common core 1 O-glycan structure Gal-beta-1-3GalNAc-R is a precursor for many extended mucin-type O-glycan structures in animal cell surface and secreted glycoproteins. Core 1 is synthesized by the transfer of Gal from UDP-Gal to GalNAc-alpha-1-R by core 1 beta-3-galactosyltransferase (C1GALT1).

C1GALT1 is associated with the T-Tn antigen system.

== Clinical significance ==
There is some evidence that mutations in the C1GALT1 gene may be associated with kidney disease.

== See also ==
- Glycoprotein-N-acetylgalactosamine 3-beta-galactosyltransferase
