= Glycoprotein-N-acetylgalactosamine 3-beta-galactosyltransferase =

Class of enzymes

glycoprotein-N-acetylgalactosamine 3-beta-galactosyltransferase

Identifiers
- EC no.: 2.4.1.122
- CAS no.: 97089-61-7

Databases
- IntEnz: IntEnz view
- BRENDA: BRENDA entry
- ExPASy: NiceZyme view
- KEGG: KEGG entry
- MetaCyc: metabolic pathway
- PRIAM: profile
- PDB structures: RCSB PDB PDBe PDBsum
- Gene Ontology: AmiGO / QuickGO
Search
- PMC: articles
- PubMed: articles
- NCBI: proteins

In enzymology, a glycoprotein-N-acetylgalactosamine 3-beta-galactosyltransferase (EC 2.4.1.122) is an enzyme that catalyzes the chemical reaction

UDP-galactose + glycoprotein N-acetyl-D-galactosamine $\rightleftharpoons$ UDP + glycoprotein D-galactosyl-1,3-N-acetyl-D-galactosamine

Thus, the two substrates of this enzyme are UDP-galactose and glycoprotein N-acetyl-D-galactosamine, whereas its two products are UDP and glycoprotein D-galactosyl-1,3-N-acetyl-D-galactosamine.

This enzyme belongs to the family of glycosyltransferases, specifically the hexosyltransferases. The systematic name of this enzyme class is UDP-galactose:glycoprotein-N-acetyl-D-galactosamine 3-beta-D-galactosyltransferase. This enzyme is also called uridine diphosphogalactose-mucin beta-(1->3)-galactosyltransferase. This enzyme participates in O-glycan biosynthesis and glycan structures - biosynthesis 1.

== See also ==
- C1GALT1
