= Enumeral =

Massachusetts biotechnology company, 2009–2018

Enumeral Biomedical Holdings, Inc.
- Type: Public
- Traded as: OTCQB: ENUM
- Industry: Biotechnology
- Founded: December 11, 2009
- Defunct: January 29, 2018
- Fate: Assets sold to Xoma Corporation during bankruptcy
- Headquarters: Cambridge, Massachusetts, United States
- Key people: John Rydzewski (Chairman); Kevin G. Sarney (interim CEO, 2018)
- Products: Monoclonal antibodies targeting immune checkpoint proteins
- Number of employees: 10 (2017)
- Website: www.enumeral.com

Enumeral was a Cambridge, Massachusetts-based biotechnology company which developed monoclonal antibody immunotherapies through an 'immunoprofiling' platform that allowed it to scan the human immune microenvironment and identify and validate potential drug candidates. The company filed for Chapter 11 bankruptcy and arranged to sell its assets to Xoma Corporation in January 2018.

== History ==
Enumeral was founded in 2009 to bring together various immunoprofiling technologies from Harvard University, Massachusetts Institute of Technology, the Whitehead Institute for Biomedical Research and Massachusetts General Hospital. The company's Scientific Founder was Christopher Love, Associate Professor of Chemical Engineering at MIT; the executive chairman is John Rydzewskand and its CEO is Arthur Tinkelenberg. In 2014 the company was taken public through a reverse takeover into a shell called Cerulean Group. Its stock is traded OTC in the US, with trading in the OTCQB marketplace tier commencing on 4 August 2014. The stock code is ENUM.

By 2015, Enumeral had completed pre-clinical development of PD-1 inhibitors and sought partners to enter clinical development with. In December 2016, Enumeral completed raising US$3.4 million to fund long-term development plans, but by May 2017, the company announced it only had sufficient cash on hand to fund operations through June 2017. Shortly thereafter, in June, the company dismissed its R&D research staff. In August 2017, Enumeral was kicked out of its headquarters in Cambridge due to non-payment of rent and other fees. The Cambridge headquarters was also the home of Celgene and Unum Therapeutics. By the time the company lost its headquarters, Arthur Tinkelenberg was being described as the company's "former president and chief executive officer".

In January 2018, Enumeral arranged a deal with Xoma Corporation, located in the San Francisco Bay Area, to sell its assets for US$1.6 million, while concurrently filing for Chapter 11 bankruptcy.

== Platform ==
Enumeral's platform consists of various proprietary cellular libraries derived from target-specific immunized sources or from human patient donors. The platform has three main parts:

- Microengraving. This platform has its origins in work which Love et al. published in the journal Nature Biotechnology in 2006. Their foundational paper showed that it was possible to quickly capture a large mass of antibody-producing cells through engraved microarrays based on intaglio printing, where those arrays were carrying the secreted products of single cells. The Love group elaborated on the utility of this microengraving technology in 2008 in two key papers. In the first they applied it to PBMCs from a Type I diabetic patient and reported that a small percentage of CD19+ B cells were secreting proinsulin-reactive antibodies. In the second they showed how the technology could be used to describe the different kinds of antibodies produced during a multipart vaccination. In 2010 the Love lab demonstrated that its microengraving technology could be used to quantify the rates of secretion of up to four cytokines simultaneously released from individual viable primary immune cells, and that, among other things, primary T cells with specific profiles of secretion could be recovered and expanded in vitro. In 2011 the Love lab provided proof that microengraving would allow multiple fresh CD8+ T cells to be evaluated for their cytotoxic activity and cytokine secretion. A 2013 paper from the Love lab reported the use of microengraving in evaluating the expression of pro-angiogenic ELR+ CXC chemokines by colorectal tumor and stromal cells. The Love lab published a review on various single-cell technologies for monitoring immune systems, including the microengraving approach, in Nature Immunology in 2014.
- Checkpoint discovery. This technology allows new immune checkpoints in T cells to be discovered. It does so through the identification of small hairpin RNA molecules involved in the release of blocks on T-cell proliferation at the time of tumour antigen recognition. This technology was discovered in the laboratory of Dr Kai Wucherpfennig at the Dana–Farber Cancer Institute and was published in Nature in 2014. Kai Wucherpfennig currently serves on Enumeral's Scientific Advisory Board.
- Whole-exome sequencing. This technology, first unveiled in Nature Biotechnology in 2014, involves the sequencing of whole exomes of circulating tumor cells by means of cell enrichment and isolation, genomic amplification, library qualification and 'census-based' sequencing.

== Anti PD-1 antibodies ==
An early commercial interest of Enumeral has focused on PD-1, currently targeted by two FDA-approved monoclonal antibody drugs - Keytruda, from Merck & Co., and Opdivo, from Bristol-Myers Squibb. In 2015 Enumeral reported that it had used its platform to raise anti-PD-1 antibodies that did not compete with Keytruda or Opdivo for binding to PD-1, nor did they appear to compete with PD-1's ligand, PD-L1. These potentially allosteric antibodies also produced more interferon gamma and showed dose-dependent increases in T cell CD25 expression. Further, Enumeral's antibodies caused higher T cell activation in ex vivo human assays than the currently marketed anti-PD-1 antibodies and, in that same setting, in combination with one of the marketed antibodies, could elicit an additive effect on T cell activation. Enumeral expects to take an anti-PD-1 antibody into clinical testing in 2016.

== Merck collaboration ==
In December 2014 Enumeral announced a collaboration with Merck & Co. in which the two companies would use the Enumeral platform to interrogate the tumor microenvironment in colorectal cancer tissues obtained directly from patients, with the aim of identifying functional cellular responses to Merck-developed immuno-oncology products. In September 2015 Enumeral announced that the Merck collaboration had achieved its first milestone, enabling Enumeral to receive a milestone payment from Merck.
