= Kai Wucherpfennig =

German-American biologist

Kai Wucherpfennig

Kai Wucherpfennig is a German-American biologist currently at the Dana–Farber Cancer Institute and an Elected Fellow of the American Association for the Advancement of Science.
