= CDCP1 =

Protein-coding gene in humans

Identifiers
- Aliases: CDCP1, CD318, SIMA135, TRASK, CUB domain containing protein 1
- External IDs: OMIM: 611735; MGI: 2442010; GeneCards: CDCP1

Gene location (Human)
Chr.	Chromosome 3 (human)
Band	3p21.31	Start	45,082,277 bp
Band	3p21.31	End	45,146,422 bp

Gene location (Mouse)
Chr.	Chromosome 9 (mouse)
Band	9|9 F4	Start	122,999,889 bp
Band	9|9 F4	End	123,045,103 bp
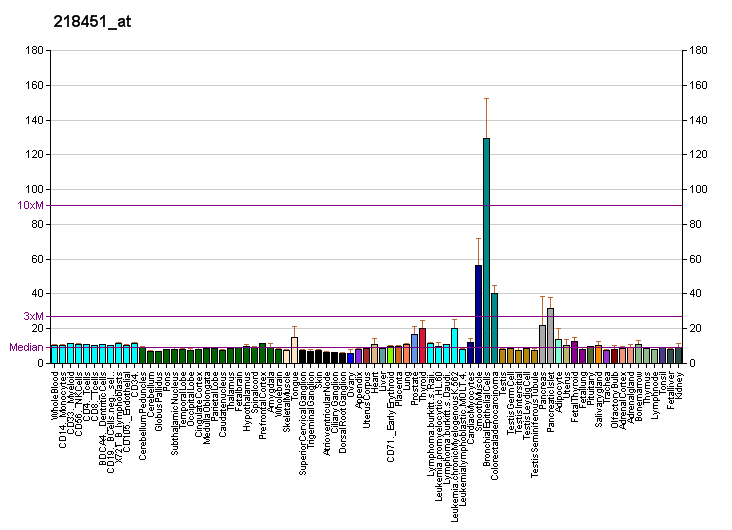
RNA expression pattern
Bgee	Human / Mouse (ortholog); Top expressed in: gingival epithelium; islet of Langerhans; mucosa of esophagus; mucosa of transverse colon; rectum; cartilage tissue; hair follicle; pancreatic ductal cell; duodenum; palpebral conjunctiva / Top expressed in: Paneth cell; conjunctival fornix; corneal stroma; lactiferous gland; Ileal epithelium; gastric mucosa; mucous cell of stomach; epithelium of stomach; jejunum; duodenum; More reference expression data
BioGPS	More reference expression data
Orthologs
Databases	NCBI: entry; OMA: entry
Species	Human	Mouse
Entrez	64866	109332
Ensembl	ENSG00000163814	ENSMUSG00000035498
UniProt	Q9H5V8	Q5U462
RefSeq (mRNA)	NM_022842; NM_178181	NM_133974
RefSeq (protein)	NP_073753; NP_835488	NP_598735
Location (UCSC)	Chr 3: 45.08 – 45.15 Mb	Chr 9: 123 – 123.05 Mb
PubMed search
- Wikidata
View/Edit Human	View/Edit Mouse

CUB domain-containing protein 1 (CDCP1) is a protein that in humans is encoded by the CDCP1 gene. CDCP1 has also been designated as CD318 (cluster of differentiation 318) and Trask (Transmembrane and associated with src kinases). Alternatively spliced transcript variants encoding distinct isoforms have been reported.

== Function ==
CDCP1 is a 140 kD transmembrane glycoprotein with a large extracellular domain (ECD) containing two CUB domains, and a smaller intracellular domain (ICD). CDCP1 is cleaved by serine proteases at the extracellular domain next to Arg368 to generate a truncated molecule of 80 kDa size. Different cell lines express different amounts of p140 and p80, depending on the activity of endogenous serine proteases.

The intracellular domain of CDCP1 contains five tyrosine residues - Y707, Y734, Y743, Y762 and Y806. The tyrosine phosphorylation of CDCP1 in cultured cells occurs when cells are induced to detach by trypsin or EDTA, or seen spontaneously during mitotic detachment.

== Clinical significance ==
The phosphorylation of CDCP1 is seen in many cancers, including some pre-invasive cancers as well as in invasive tumors and in tumor metastases.
