= Decoy receptor 2 =

Protein-coding gene in the species Homo sapiens

TNFRSF10D

Identifiers
- Aliases: TNFRSF10D, CD264, DCR2, TRAIL-R4, TRAILR4, TRUNDD, tumor necrosis factor receptor superfamily member 10d, TNF receptor superfamily member 10d
- External IDs: OMIM: 603614; GeneCards: TNFRSF10D

Gene location (Human)
Chr.	Chromosome 8 (human)
Band	8p21.3	Start	23,135,588 bp
Band	8p21.3	End	23,164,027 bp
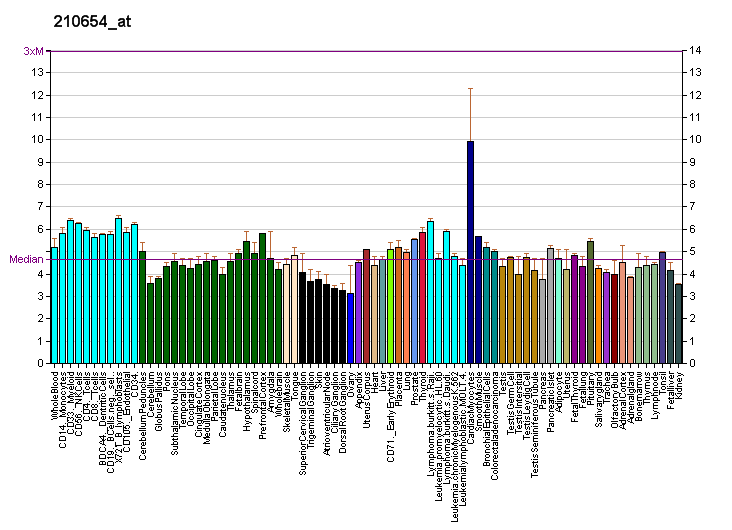
RNA expression pattern
Bgee	Human / Mouse (ortholog); Top expressed in: cartilage tissue; pancreatic epithelial cell; stromal cell of endometrium; pancreatic ductal cell; islet of Langerhans; mucosa of ileum; right lobe of liver; endothelial cell; gastric mucosa; monocyte / n/a; More reference expression data
BioGPS	More reference expression data
Gene ontology
Molecular function	transmembrane signaling receptor activity; tumor necrosis factor-activated receptor activity; TRAIL binding
Cellular component	integral component of membrane; integral component of plasma membrane; membrane; plasma membrane; cell surface
Biological process	multicellular organism development; response to lipopolysaccharide; inflammatory response; negative regulation of apoptotic process; regulation of cell population proliferation; immune response; signal transduction; apoptotic process; tumor necrosis factor-mediated signaling pathway; regulation of apoptotic process; leukocyte migration; apoptotic signaling pathway; negative regulation of cysteine-type endopeptidase activity involved in apoptotic process; cell surface receptor signaling pathway
Sources:Amigo / QuickGO
Orthologs
Databases	NCBI: entry; OMA: entry
Species	Human	Mouse
Entrez	8793	n/a
Ensembl	ENSG00000173530	n/a
UniProt	Q9UBN6	n/a
RefSeq (mRNA)	NM_003840	n/a
RefSeq (protein)	NP_003831	n/a
Location (UCSC)	Chr 8: 23.14 – 23.16 Mb	n/a
PubMed search		n/a
- Wikidata
View/Edit Human

Decoy receptor 2 (DCR2), also known as TRAIL receptor 4 (TRAILR4) and tumor necrosis factor receptor superfamily member 10D (TNFRSF10D), is a human cell surface receptor of the TNF-receptor superfamily.

== Function ==
The protein encoded by this gene is a member of the TNF-receptor superfamily. This receptor contains an extracellular TRAIL-binding domain, a transmembrane domain, and a truncated cytoplasmic death domain.

This receptor does not induce apoptosis, and has been shown to play an inhibitory role in TRAIL-induced cell apoptosis.
