= Fcα/μR =

Protein used by the immune system

FCAMR

Identifiers
- Aliases: FCAMR, CD351, FCA/MR, FKSG87, Fc fragment of IgA and IgM receptor, Fc alpha and mu receptor, Fcalpha/muR
- External IDs: OMIM: 605484; MGI: 1927803; GeneCards: FCAMR

Gene location (Human)
Chr.	Chromosome 1 (human)
Band	1q32.1	Start	206,957,965 bp
Band	1q32.1	End	206,970,625 bp

Gene location (Mouse)
Chr.	Chromosome 1 (mouse)
Band	1|1 E4	Start	130,728,639 bp
Band	1|1 E4	End	130,742,477 bp
RNA expression pattern
Bgee	Human / Mouse (ortholog); Top expressed in: human kidney; mucosa of ileum; lymph node; appendix; right lobe of liver; mucosa of transverse colon; tonsil; renal cortex; rectum; duodenum / Top expressed in: right kidney; proximal tubule; zygote; transitional epithelium of urinary bladder; olfactory epithelium; secondary oocyte; human kidney; lip; esophagus; neural layer of retina; More reference expression data
BioGPS	n/a
Orthologs
Databases	NCBI: entry; OMA: entry
Species	Human	Mouse
Entrez	83953	64435
Ensembl	ENSG00000162897	ENSMUSG00000026415
UniProt	Q8WWV6	Q2TB54
RefSeq (mRNA)	NM_001122979; NM_001122980; NM_001170631; NM_032029	NM_001170632; NM_144960
RefSeq (protein)	NP_001116451; NP_001164102; NP_114418	NP_001164103; NP_659209
Location (UCSC)	Chr 1: 206.96 – 206.97 Mb	Chr 1: 130.73 – 130.74 Mb
PubMed search
- Wikidata
View/Edit Human	View/Edit Mouse

Fc receptor, IgA, IgM, high affinity

Identifiers
- Symbol: FCAMR, CD351
- NCBI gene: 83953
- HGNC: 24692
- OMIM: 605484
- RefSeq: NM_032029
- UniProt: Q96SA2

Other data
- Locus: Chr. 1 q32.1
Search for
- Structures: Swiss-model
- Domains: InterPro

Fcα/μR, also known as is CD351 (Cluster of Differentiation 351), is an Fc receptor that binds IgM with high affinity and IgA with a 10-fold lower affinity. In mice the receptor is expressed on macrophages, follicular dendritic cells, marginal zone B cells, follicular B cells, and kidney tubular epithelial cells. In humans expression has been described on intestinal lamina propria cells, Paneth cells, follicular dendritic cells in tonsils, activated macrophages and some types of pre-germinal centre IgD+/CD38+ B cells.
