= LAIR2 =

Protein-coding gene in the species Homo sapiens

Identifiers
- Aliases: LAIR2, CD306, leukocyte associated immunoglobulin like receptor 2
- External IDs: OMIM: 602993; GeneCards: LAIR2

Gene location (Human)
Chr.	Chromosome 19 (human)
Band	19q13.42	Start	54,497,879 bp
Band	19q13.42	End	54,510,687 bp
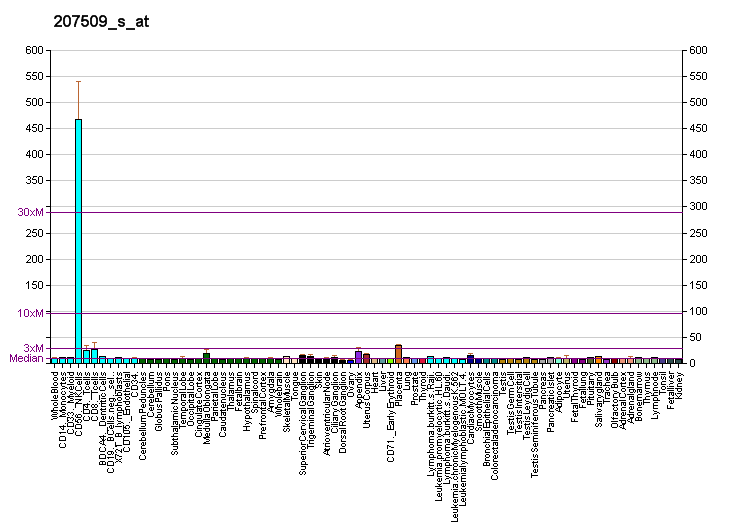
RNA expression pattern
Bgee	Human / Mouse (ortholog); Top expressed in: granulocyte; placenta; blood; lymph node; appendix; monocyte; bone marrow; spleen; right coronary artery; right lung / n/a; More reference expression data
BioGPS	More reference expression data
Gene ontology
Molecular function	protein binding
Cellular component	extracellular region
Biological process	regulation of immune response
Sources:Amigo / QuickGO
Orthologs
Databases	NCBI: entry; OMA: entry
Species	Human	Mouse
Entrez	3904	n/a
Ensembl	ENSG00000167618; ENSG00000275819; ENSG00000277335; ENSG00000274084	n/a
UniProt	Q6ISS4	n/a
RefSeq (mRNA)	NM_002288; NM_021270	n/a
RefSeq (protein)	NP_002279; NP_067154	n/a
Location (UCSC)	Chr 19: 54.5 – 54.51 Mb	n/a
PubMed search		n/a
- Wikidata
View/Edit Human

Leukocyte-associated immunoglobulin-like receptor 2 is a protein that in humans is encoded by the LAIR2 gene.

The protein encoded by this gene is a member of the immunoglobulin superfamily. It was identified by its similarity to LAIR1, an inhibitory receptor present on mononuclear leukocytes. This gene maps to a region of 19q13.4, termed the leukocyte receptor cluster, which contains 29 genes in the immunoglobulin superfamily, including LAIR1. The function of this protein is unknown, although it is thought to be secreted and may help modulate mucosal tolerance. Two transcript variants encoding different isoforms have been found for this gene.
