= ART4 =

Protein-coding gene in humans

Identifiers
- Aliases: ART4, ARTC4, CD297, DO, DOK1, ADP-ribosyltransferase 4 (Dombrock blood group), DO/ADP-ribosyltransferase 4 (inactive) (Dombrock blood group)
- External IDs: OMIM: 110600; MGI: 1202710; GeneCards: ART4
Enzyme activity
EC #	BRENDA	ExPASy	KEGG	MetaCyc
2.4.2.31	↗	↗	↗	↗

Gene location (Human)
Chr.	Chromosome 12 (human)
Band	12p12.3	Start	14,825,569 bp
Band	12p12.3	End	14,843,526 bp

Gene location (Mouse)
Chr.	Chromosome 6 (mouse)
Band	6 G1|6 66.72 cM	Start	136,825,449 bp
Band	6 G1|6 66.72 cM	End	136,834,731 bp
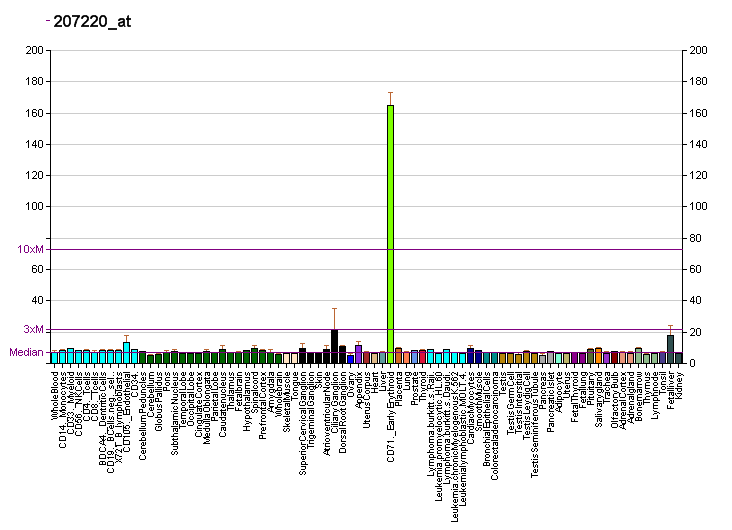
RNA expression pattern
Bgee	Human / Mouse (ortholog); Top expressed in: liver; right lobe of liver; right coronary artery; right auricle of heart; thoracic aorta; ascending aorta; gallbladder; Descending thoracic aorta; left coronary artery; trabecular bone / Top expressed in: fetal liver hematopoietic progenitor cell; interventricular septum; lacrimal gland; lumbar spinal ganglion; right lobe of liver; embryo; myocardium of ventricle; thymus; blastocyst; lip; More reference expression data
BioGPS	More reference expression data
Gene ontology
Molecular function	transferase activity; NAD+-protein-arginine ADP-ribosyltransferase activity; glycosyltransferase activity; NAD+ ADP-ribosyltransferase activity
Cellular component	anchored component of membrane; membrane; extracellular region; plasma membrane
Biological process	protein ADP-ribosylation; arginine metabolic process; peptidyl-arginine ADP-ribosylation
Sources:Amigo / QuickGO
Orthologs
Databases	NCBI: entry; OMA: entry
Species	Human	Mouse
Entrez	420	109978
Ensembl	ENSG00000111339	ENSMUSG00000030217
UniProt	Q93070	Q9CRA0
RefSeq (mRNA)	NM_021071; NM_001354646	NM_026639
RefSeq (protein)	NP_066549; NP_001341575	NP_080915
Location (UCSC)	Chr 12: 14.83 – 14.84 Mb	Chr 6: 136.83 – 136.83 Mb
PubMed search
- Wikidata
View/Edit Human	View/Edit Mouse

Ecto-ADP-ribosyltransferase 4 is an enzyme that in humans is encoded by the ART4 gene. ART4 has also been designated as CD297 (cluster of differentiation 297).

== Function ==
This gene encodes a protein that contains a mono-ADP-ribosylation (ART) motif. It is a member of the ADP-ribosyltransferase gene family but enzymatic activity has not been demonstrated experimentally. Antigens of the Dombrock blood group system are located on the gene product, which is glycosylphosphatidylinositol-anchored to the erythrocyte membrane. Allelic variants, some of which lead to adverse transfusion reactions, are known.

== Blood group antigens ==
Several antigens have been recognised in this family. These are DO*A, DO*JO1, DO*A-WL, DO*DOYA, DO*B, DO*B-WL, DO*B-SH-Q149K, DO*B-(WL)-I175N, DO*HY1, DO*HY2 and DO*DOMR.

== Clinical diagnostic ==
Clinical testing in patient care for Dombrock antigens follows published minimum quality and operational requirements, similar to red cell genotyping for any of the other recognized blood group systems. Molecular analysis can identify gene variants (alleles) that may affect Dombrock antigens expression on the red cell membrane.
