= Decoy receptor 1 =

Protein-coding gene in the species Homo sapiens

TNFRSF10C

Identifiers
- Aliases: TNFRSF10C, CD263, DCR1, DCR1-TNFR, LIT, TRAIL-R3, TRAILR3, TRID, tumor necrosis factor receptor superfamily member 10c, TNF receptor superfamily member 10c
- External IDs: OMIM: 603613; GeneCards: TNFRSF10C

Gene location (Human)
Chr.	Chromosome 8 (human)
Band	8p21.3	Start	23,102,921 bp
Band	8p21.3	End	23,117,445 bp
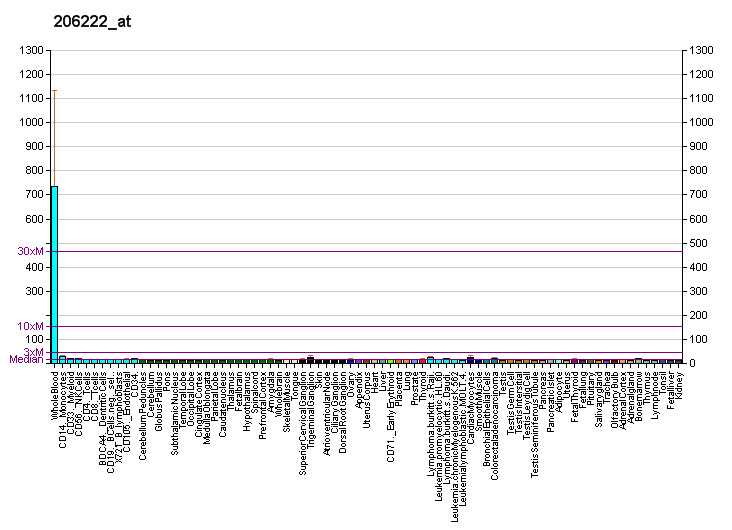

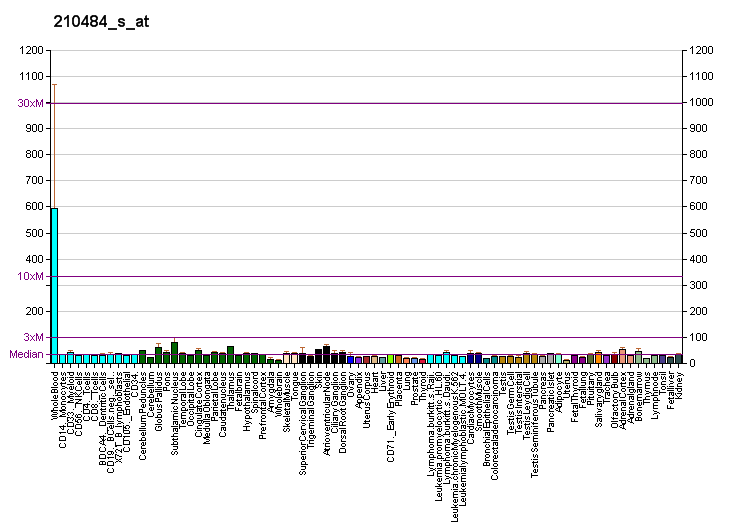

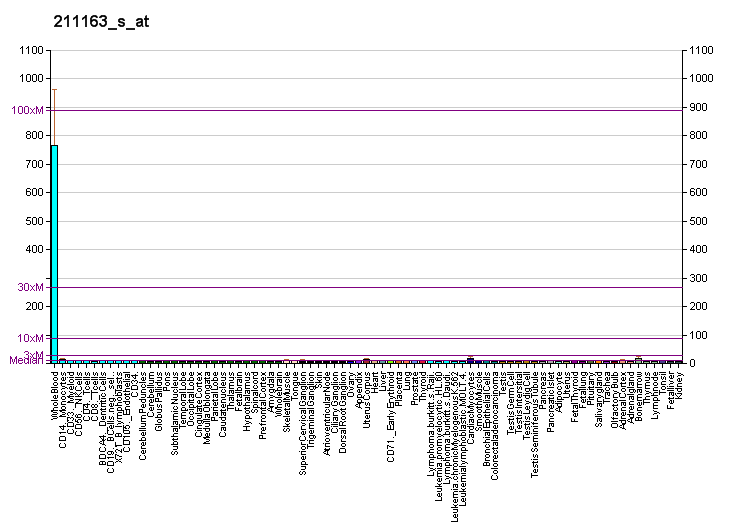
RNA expression pattern
Bgee	Human / Mouse (ortholog); Top expressed in: blood; granulocyte; testicle; periodontal fiber; bone marrow; gonad; monocyte; spleen; gallbladder; bone marrow cell / n/a; More reference expression data
BioGPS	More reference expression data
Gene ontology
Molecular function	transmembrane signaling receptor activity; tumor necrosis factor-activated receptor activity; TRAIL binding
Cellular component	anchored component of membrane; integral component of plasma membrane; membrane; plasma membrane; cell surface
Biological process	multicellular organism development; response to lipopolysaccharide; inflammatory response; regulation of cell population proliferation; immune response; signal transduction; apoptotic process; tumor necrosis factor-mediated signaling pathway; apoptotic signaling pathway; regulation of apoptotic process; negative regulation of cysteine-type endopeptidase activity involved in apoptotic process; TRAIL-activated apoptotic signaling pathway; positive regulation of apoptotic process
Sources:Amigo / QuickGO
Orthologs
Databases	NCBI: entry; OMA: entry
Species	Human	Mouse
Entrez	8794	n/a
Ensembl	ENSG00000173535	n/a
UniProt	O14798	n/a
RefSeq (mRNA)	NM_003841	n/a
RefSeq (protein)	NP_003832	n/a
Location (UCSC)	Chr 8: 23.1 – 23.12 Mb	n/a
PubMed search		n/a
- Wikidata
View/Edit Human

Decoy receptor 1 (DCR1), also known as TRAIL receptor 3 (TRAILR3) and tumor necrosis factor receptor superfamily member 10C (TNFRSF10C), is a human cell surface receptor of the TNF-receptor superfamily.

== Function ==
The protein encoded by this gene is a member of the TNF-receptor superfamily. This receptor contains an extracellular TRAIL-binding domain and a transmembrane domain, but no cytoplasmic death domain. This receptor is not capable of inducing apoptosis, and is thought to function as an antagonistic receptor that protects cells from TRAIL-induced apoptosis. This gene was found to be a p53-regulated DNA damage-inducible gene. The expression of this gene was detected in many normal tissues but not in most cancer cell lines, which may explain the specific sensitivity of cancer cells to the apoptosis-inducing activity of TRAIL.
