= PTGFRN =

Protein-coding gene in humans

Identifiers
- Aliases: PTGFRN, CD315, CD9P-1, EWI-F, FPRP, SMAP-6, prostaglandin F2 receptor inhibitor
- External IDs: OMIM: 601204; MGI: 1277114; GeneCards: PTGFRN

Gene location (Human)
Chr.	Chromosome 1 (human)
Band	1p13.1	Start	116,909,916 bp
Band	1p13.1	End	116,990,353 bp

Gene location (Mouse)
Chr.	Chromosome 3 (mouse)
Band	3|3 F2.2	Start	100,947,548 bp
Band	3|3 F2.2	End	101,017,594 bp
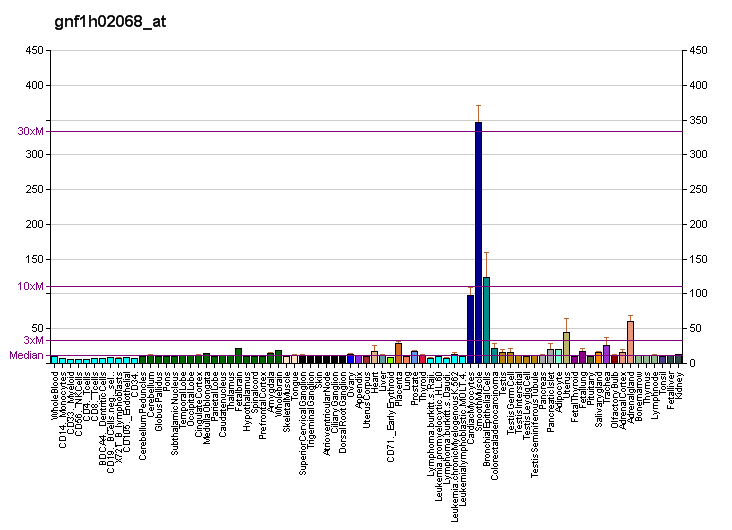
RNA expression pattern
Bgee	Human / Mouse (ortholog); Top expressed in: cardiac muscle tissue of right atrium; ventricular zone; muscle layer of sigmoid colon; myocardium of left ventricle; right auricle of heart; left uterine tube; body of uterus; olfactory zone of nasal mucosa; myometrium; right ventricle / Top expressed in: umbilical cord; atrium; ventricular zone; left lung lobe; right lung lobe; Gonadal ridge; atrioventricular valve; molar; urinary bladder; endocardial cushion; More reference expression data
BioGPS	More reference expression data
Gene ontology
Molecular function	protein binding
Cellular component	cell surface; Golgi apparatus; endoplasmic reticulum membrane; endoplasmic reticulum; membrane; plasma membrane; integral component of membrane
Biological process	lipid droplet organization; myoblast fusion involved in skeletal muscle regeneration
Sources:Amigo / QuickGO
Orthologs
Databases	NCBI: entry; OMA: entry
Species	Human	Mouse
Entrez	5738	19221
Ensembl	ENSG00000134247	ENSMUSG00000027864
UniProt	Q9P2B2	Q9WV91
RefSeq (mRNA)	NM_020440	NM_011197
RefSeq (protein)	NP_065173	NP_035327
Location (UCSC)	Chr 1: 116.91 – 116.99 Mb	Chr 3: 100.95 – 101.02 Mb
PubMed search
- Wikidata
View/Edit Human	View/Edit Mouse

Prostaglandin F2 receptor negative regulator is a protein that in humans is encoded by the PTGFRN gene. PTGFRN has also been designated as CD315 (cluster of differentiation 315).

== Interactions ==
PTGFRN has been shown to interact with CD9 and CD81.
