= SLAMF8 =

Protein-coding gene in humans

Identifiers
- Aliases: SLAMF8, BLAME, CD353, SBBI42, SLAM family member 8
- External IDs: OMIM: 606620; MGI: 1921998; GeneCards: SLAMF8

Gene location (Human)
Chr.	Chromosome 1 (human)
Band	1q23.2	Start	159,826,811 bp
Band	1q23.2	End	159,837,492 bp

Gene location (Mouse)
Chr.	Chromosome 1 (mouse)
Band	1|1 H3	Start	172,409,325 bp
Band	1|1 H3	End	172,418,135 bp
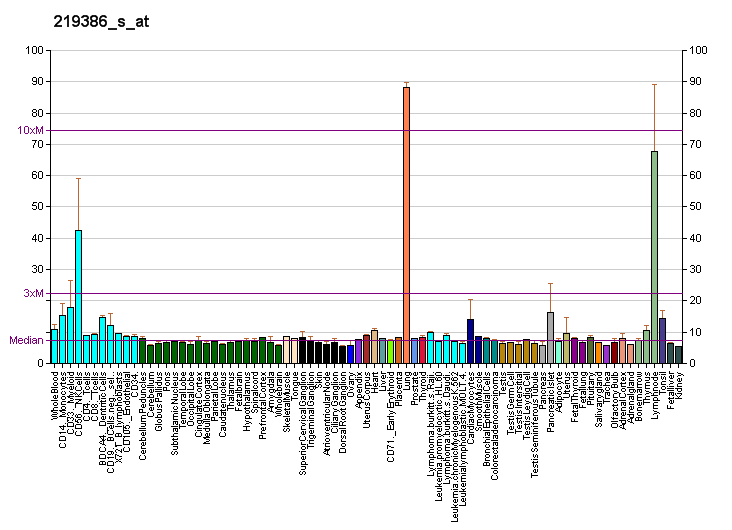

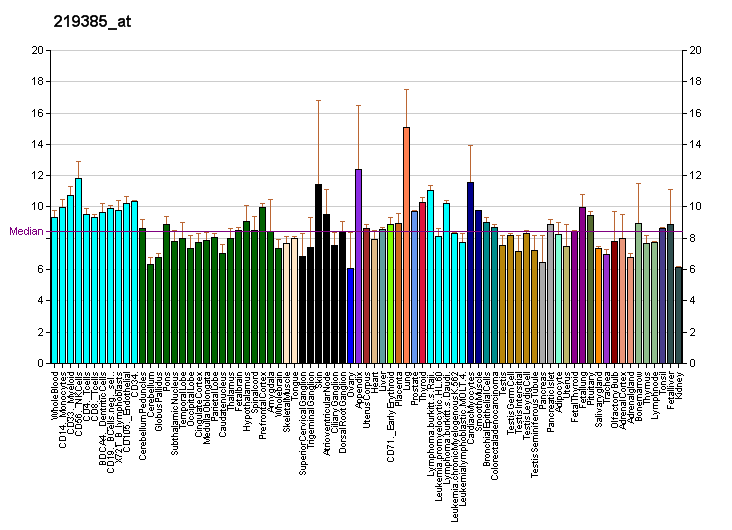
RNA expression pattern
Bgee	Human / Mouse (ortholog); Top expressed in: appendix; lymph node; testicle; lower lobe of lung; decidua; spleen; superficial temporal artery; amniotic fluid; gallbladder; rectum / Top expressed in: mesenteric lymph nodes; embryo; spleen; lumbar subsegment of spinal cord; morula; granulocyte; right kidney; blastocyst; thymus; subcutaneous adipose tissue; More reference expression data
BioGPS	More reference expression data
Gene ontology
Molecular function	signaling receptor activity; identical protein binding
Cellular component	membrane; integral component of membrane; cell surface
Biological process	leukocyte chemotaxis involved in inflammatory response; B-1 B cell lineage commitment; negative regulation of macrophage chemotaxis; regulation of NAD(P)H oxidase activity; defense response to bacterium; regulation of kinase activity; regulation of B cell differentiation; negative regulation of respiratory burst involved in inflammatory response; negative regulation of monocyte chemotaxis; phagosome acidification; negative regulation of neutrophil migration; negative regulation of dendritic cell chemotaxis
Sources:Amigo / QuickGO
Orthologs
Databases	NCBI: entry; OMA: entry
Species	Human	Mouse
Entrez	56833	74748
Ensembl	ENSG00000158714	ENSMUSG00000053318
UniProt	Q9P0V8	Q9D3G2
RefSeq (mRNA)	NM_020125; NM_001330741	NM_029084
RefSeq (protein)	NP_001317670; NP_064510	NP_083360
Location (UCSC)	Chr 1: 159.83 – 159.84 Mb	Chr 1: 172.41 – 172.42 Mb
PubMed search
- Wikidata
View/Edit Human	View/Edit Mouse

SLAM family member 8 is a protein that in humans is encoded by the SLAMF8 gene.

== Function ==
This gene encodes a member of the CD2 family of cell surface proteins involved in lymphocyte activation. These proteins are characterized by Ig domains. This protein is expressed in lymphoid tissues, and studies of a similar protein in mouse suggest that it may function during B cell lineage commitment. The gene is found in a region of chromosome 1 containing many CD2 genes.
