= Peptidase inhibitor 16 =

Protein-coding gene in the species Homo sapiens

PI16

Identifiers
- Aliases: PI16, CRISP9, MSMBBP, PSPBP, CD364, peptidase inhibitor 16
- External IDs: MGI: 1921366; GeneCards: PI16

Gene location (Human)
Chr.	Chromosome 6 (human)
Band	6p21.2	Start	36,948,263 bp
Band	6p21.2	End	36,964,837 bp

Gene location (Mouse)
Chr.	Chromosome 17 (mouse)
Band	17|17 A3.3	Start	29,536,654 bp
Band	17|17 A3.3	End	29,549,567 bp
RNA expression pattern
Bgee	Human / Mouse (ortholog); Top expressed in: skin of arm; apex of heart; gastric mucosa; right auricle of heart; vena cava; pancreatic ductal cell; right coronary artery; canal of the cervix; trachea; C1 segment / Top expressed in: granulocyte; lip; extraocular muscle; ascending aorta; aortic valve; ankle; esophagus; sciatic nerve; conjunctival fornix; tunica adventitia of aorta; More reference expression data
BioGPS	n/a
Gene ontology
Molecular function	peptidase inhibitor activity
Cellular component	extracellular region; extracellular space
Biological process	negative regulation of peptidase activity; negative regulation of cell growth involved in cardiac muscle cell development
Sources:Amigo / QuickGO
Orthologs
Databases	NCBI: entry; OMA: entry
Species	Human	Mouse
Entrez	221476	74116
Ensembl	ENSG00000164530	ENSMUSG00000024011
UniProt	Q6UXB8	Q9ET66
RefSeq (mRNA)	NM_001199159; NM_153370	NM_023734
RefSeq (protein)	NP_001186088; NP_699201	NP_076223
Location (UCSC)	Chr 6: 36.95 – 36.96 Mb	Chr 17: 29.54 – 29.55 Mb
PubMed search
- Wikidata
View/Edit Human	View/Edit Mouse

Peptidase inhibitor 16 is a protein that in humans is encoded by the PI16 gene.
