= EVI2B =

Protein-coding gene in the species Homo sapiens

Identifiers
- Aliases: EVI2B, CD361, D17S376, EVDB, ecotropic viral integration site 2B
- External IDs: OMIM: 158381; MGI: 5439444; GeneCards: EVI2B

Gene location (Human)
Chr.	Chromosome 17 (human)
Band	17q11.2	Start	31,303,770 bp
Band	17q11.2	End	31,314,105 bp

Gene location (Mouse)
Chr.	Chromosome 11 (mouse)
Band	11 B5|11	Start	79,404,211 bp
Band	11 B5|11	End	79,421,415 bp
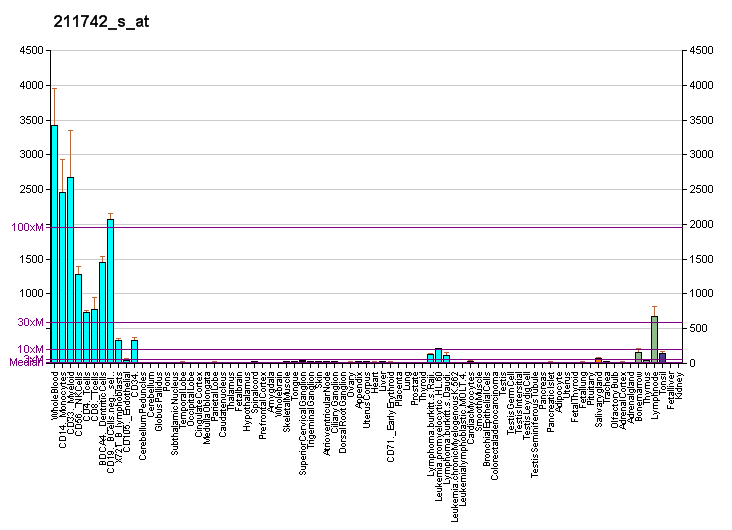
RNA expression pattern
Bgee	Human / Mouse (ortholog); Top expressed in: monocyte; blood; granulocyte; bone marrow; bone marrow cell; trabecular bone; spleen; appendix; lymph node; right lung / Top expressed in: granulocyte; bone marrow; blood; thymus; tail of embryo; spleen; genital tubercle; aortic valve; lip; esophagus; More reference expression data
BioGPS	More reference expression data
Orthologs
Databases	NCBI: entry; OMA: entry
Species	Human	Mouse
Entrez	2124	101488212
Ensembl	ENSG00000185862	ENSMUSG00000070354
UniProt	P34910	Q8VD58
RefSeq (mRNA)	NM_006495	NM_146023
RefSeq (protein)	NP_006486	NP_666135; NP_001070964
Location (UCSC)	Chr 17: 31.3 – 31.31 Mb	Chr 11: 79.4 – 79.42 Mb
PubMed search
- Wikidata
View/Edit Human	View/Edit Mouse

Protein EVI2B is a protein that in humans is encoded by the EVI2B gene.
