= ATP1B3 =

Protein-coding gene in the species Homo sapiens

Identifiers
- Aliases: ATP1B3, ATPB-3, CD298, ATPase Na+/K+ transporting subunit beta 3
- External IDs: OMIM: 601867; MGI: 107788; GeneCards: ATP1B3

Gene location (Human)
Chr.	Chromosome 3 (human)
Band	3q23	Start	141,876,124 bp
Band	3q23	End	141,926,549 bp

Gene location (Mouse)
Chr.	Chromosome 9 (mouse)
Band	9 E3.3|9 50.31 cM	Start	96,214,708 bp
Band	9 E3.3|9 50.31 cM	End	96,246,495 bp
RNA expression pattern
Bgee	Human / Mouse (ortholog); Top expressed in: sperm; skin of thigh; skin of hip; gingival epithelium; mucosa of colon; mucosa of pharynx; stromal cell of endometrium; vulva; mucosa of sigmoid colon; mucosa of transverse colon / Top expressed in: sciatic nerve; epithelium of lens; seminiferous tubule; choroid plexus of fourth ventricle; corneal stroma; gastrula; molar; utricle; skin of external ear; superior surface of tongue; More reference expression data
BioGPS	n/a
Gene ontology
Molecular function	ATPase binding; P-type sodium:potassium-exchanging transporter activity; ATPase activator activity
Cellular component	cytoplasm; integral component of membrane; membrane; melanosome; plasma membrane; sodium:potassium-exchanging ATPase complex; caveola; extracellular exosome
Biological process	regulation of cardiac conduction; positive regulation of ATP-dependent activity; positive regulation of sodium ion export across plasma membrane; sodium ion transport; cellular sodium ion homeostasis; sodium ion export across plasma membrane; metal ion transport; positive regulation of potassium ion import across plasma membrane; protein stabilization; ion transport; cellular potassium ion homeostasis; potassium ion transport; membrane repolarization; ion transmembrane transport; protein localization to plasma membrane; leukocyte migration; positive regulation of potassium ion transmembrane transporter activity; establishment or maintenance of transmembrane electrochemical gradient; transport; potassium ion import across plasma membrane
Sources:Amigo / QuickGO
Orthologs
Databases	NCBI: entry; OMA: entry
Species	Human	Mouse
Entrez	483	11933
Ensembl	ENSG00000069849	ENSMUSG00000032412
UniProt	P54709	P97370
RefSeq (mRNA)	NM_001679	NM_007502; NM_001357212; NM_001357213
RefSeq (protein)	NP_001670	NP_031528; NP_001344141; NP_001344142
Location (UCSC)	Chr 3: 141.88 – 141.93 Mb	Chr 9: 96.21 – 96.25 Mb
PubMed search
- Wikidata
View/Edit Human	View/Edit Mouse

Sodium/potassium-transporting ATPase subunit beta-3 is an enzyme that in humans is encoded by the ATP1B3 gene. ATP1B3 has also been designated as CD298 (cluster of differentiation 298).

The protein encoded by this gene belongs to the family of Na+/K+ and H+/K+ ATPases beta chain proteins, and to the subfamily of Na+/K+ -ATPases. Na+/K+ -ATPase is an integral membrane protein responsible for establishing and maintaining the electrochemical gradients of Na and K ions across the plasma membrane. These gradients are essential for osmoregulation, for sodium-coupled transport of a variety of organic and inorganic molecules, and for electrical excitability of nerve and muscle. This enzyme is composed of two subunits, a large catalytic subunit (alpha) and a smaller glycoprotein subunit (beta). The beta subunit regulates, through assembly of alpha/beta heterodimers, the number of sodium pumps transported to the plasma membrane. The glycoprotein subunit of Na+/K+ -ATPase is encoded by multiple genes. This gene encodes a beta 3 subunit. A pseudogene exists for this gene, and it is located on chromosome 2.
