= CD180 =

Protein-coding gene in humans

Identifiers
- Aliases: CD180, LY64, Ly78, RP105, CD180 molecule
- External IDs: OMIM: 602226; MGI: 1194924; GeneCards: CD180
Available structures
PDB	Ortholog search: PDBe RCSB
PDB	List of PDB id codes 3B2D

Gene location (Human)
Chr.	Chromosome 5 (human)
Band	5q12.3	Start	67,179,613 bp
Band	5q12.3	End	67,196,799 bp

Gene location (Mouse)
Chr.	Chromosome 13 (mouse)
Band	13|13 D1	Start	102,830,066 bp
Band	13|13 D1	End	102,876,137 bp
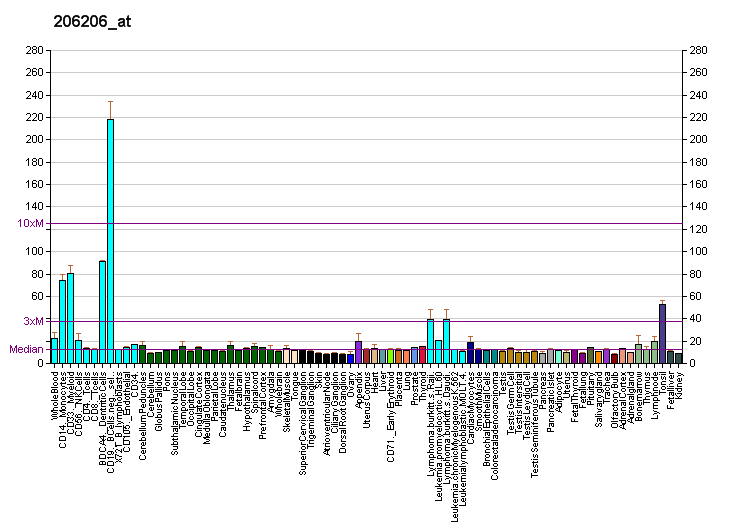
RNA expression pattern
Bgee	Human / Mouse (ortholog); Top expressed in: pancreatic ductal cell; lymph node; white blood cell; monocyte; granulocyte; spleen; appendix; bone marrow cell; blood; superficial temporal artery / Top expressed in: mesenteric lymph nodes; zygote; granulocyte; secondary oocyte; spleen; primary oocyte; right ventricle; tibiofemoral joint; blood; thymus; More reference expression data
BioGPS	More reference expression data
Gene ontology
Molecular function	protein binding
Cellular component	integral component of membrane; plasma membrane; membrane; integral component of plasma membrane; extracellular space; extracellular matrix
Biological process	positive regulation of lipopolysaccharide-mediated signaling pathway; innate immune response; cellular response to lipopolysaccharide; B cell proliferation involved in immune response; immune system process; toll-like receptor signaling pathway; inflammatory response
Sources:Amigo / QuickGO
Orthologs
Databases	NCBI: entry; OMA: entry
Species	Human	Mouse
Entrez	4064	17079
Ensembl	ENSG00000134061	ENSMUSG00000021624
UniProt	Q99467	Q62192
RefSeq (mRNA)	NM_005582	NM_008533; NM_001360519
RefSeq (protein)	NP_005573	NP_032559; NP_001347448
Location (UCSC)	Chr 5: 67.18 – 67.2 Mb	Chr 13: 102.83 – 102.88 Mb
PubMed search
- Wikidata
View/Edit Human	View/Edit Mouse

CD180 antigen is a protein that in humans is encoded by the CD180 gene.

CD180 is a cell surface molecule consisting of extracellular leucine-rich repeats (LRR) and a short cytoplasmic tail. It is also known by the archaic terms Bgp-95 and RP105, for the founding designations following discovery in humans (1988) and mice (1994), respectively. CD180 is expressed on antigen presenting cells including B cells and dendritic cells. The extracellular LRR is associated with a molecule called MD-1 and form the cell surface receptor complex, CD180/MD-1. It belongs to the family of pathogen receptors, Toll-like receptors (TLR). CD180/MD-1, by working in concert with TLR4, controls B cell recognition and signaling of lipopolysaccharide (LPS), a membrane constituent of Gram-negative bacteria.

Recently, CD180 has been demonstrated to be involved in the survival and prognosis of B-cell chronic lymphocytic leukemia.
