= CD72 =

Animal protein found in humans

Identifiers
- Aliases: CD72, CD72b, LYB2, CD72 molecule
- External IDs: OMIM: 107272; MGI: 88345; GeneCards: CD72

Gene location (Human)
Chr.	Chromosome 9 (human)
Band	9p13.3	Start	35,609,982 bp
Band	9p13.3	End	35,646,810 bp

Gene location (Mouse)
Chr.	Chromosome 4 (mouse)
Band	4 A5|4 23.04 cM	Start	43,446,462 bp
Band	4 A5|4 23.04 cM	End	43,454,628 bp
RNA expression pattern
Bgee	Human / Mouse (ortholog); Top expressed in: spleen; lymph node; granulocyte; appendix; blood; bone marrow; tonsil; gallbladder; superficial temporal artery; right uterine tube / Top expressed in: spleen; mesenteric lymph nodes; blood; tibiofemoral joint; submandibular gland; granulocyte; bone marrow; body of femur; subcutaneous adipose tissue; thymus; More reference expression data
BioGPS	n/a
Gene ontology
Molecular function	signaling receptor binding; protein binding; transmembrane signaling receptor activity; carbohydrate binding
Cellular component	integral component of membrane; plasma membrane; integral component of plasma membrane; membrane
Biological process	cell adhesion; signal transduction
Sources:Amigo / QuickGO
Orthologs
Databases	NCBI: entry; OMA: entry
Species	Human	Mouse
Entrez	971	12517
Ensembl	ENSG00000137101	ENSMUSG00000028459
UniProt	P21854	P21855
RefSeq (mRNA)	NM_001782	NM_001110320; NM_001110321; NM_001110322; NM_007654
RefSeq (protein)	NP_001773	NP_001103790; NP_001103791; NP_001103792; NP_031680
Location (UCSC)	Chr 9: 35.61 – 35.65 Mb	Chr 4: 43.45 – 43.45 Mb
PubMed search
- Wikidata
View/Edit Human	View/Edit Mouse

CD72 molecule

Identifiers
- Symbol: CD72
- NCBI gene: 971
- HGNC: 1696
- OMIM: 107272
- RefSeq: NM_001782
- UniProt: P21854

Other data
- Locus: Chr. 9 p
Search for
- Structures: Swiss-model
- Domains: InterPro

CD72 (Cluster of differentiation 72), also known in murine biology as Lyb-2, is a protein active in the immune system of animals. It consists of two identical halves, each of about 39-43 kD, and is a C-type lectin. Its primarily locus of expression is B-cells (from the pro-B through the mature B-cell stage), where it appears to mediate aspects of B-cell - T-cell interaction. It is a ligand for CD5.

CD72 is a regulatory protein on B lymphocytes. The cytoplasmic tail of CD72 contains two potential immunoreceptor tyrosine-based inhibitory motifs, one of which has been shown to recruit the tyrosine phosphatase SHP- 1. These features suggest a negative regulatory role for CD72. CD72 is a nonredundant regulator of B-cell development and a negative regulator of B-cell responsiveness.
