= FCRL2 =

Protein-coding gene in humans

Identifiers
- Aliases: FCRL2, CD307b, FCRH2, IFGP4, IRTA4, SPAP1, SPAP1A, SPAP1B, SPAP1C, Fc receptor like 2
- External IDs: OMIM: 606509; GeneCards: FCRL2

Gene location (Human)
Chr.	Chromosome 1 (human)
Band	1q23.1	Start	157,745,733 bp
Band	1q23.1	End	157,777,132 bp
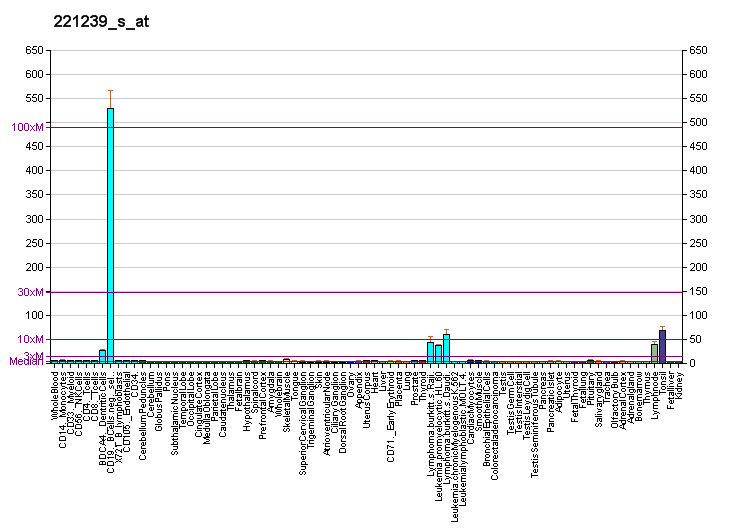
RNA expression pattern
Bgee	Human / Mouse (ortholog); Top expressed in: buccal mucosa cell; spleen; lymph node; epithelium of nasopharynx; granulocyte; appendix; tonsil; superficial temporal artery; mucosa of ileum; blood / n/a; More reference expression data
BioGPS	More reference expression data
Gene ontology
Molecular function	protein binding
Cellular component	plasma membrane; membrane; integral component of membrane; cell surface
Biological process	cell-cell signaling; positive regulation of signal transduction
Sources:Amigo / QuickGO
Orthologs
Databases	NCBI: entry; OMA: entry
Species	Human	Mouse
Entrez	79368	n/a
Ensembl	ENSG00000132704	n/a
UniProt	Q96LA5	n/a
RefSeq (mRNA)	NM_001159488; NM_030764; NM_138738; NM_138739	n/a
RefSeq (protein)	NP_001152960; NP_110391	n/a
Location (UCSC)	Chr 1: 157.75 – 157.78 Mb	n/a
PubMed search		n/a
- Wikidata
View/Edit Human

Fc receptor-like protein 2 is a protein that in humans is encoded by the FCRL2 gene.
