= FCRL4 =

Protein-coding gene in humans

Identifiers
- Aliases: FCRL4, CD307d, FCRH4, IGFP2, IRTA1, Fc receptor like 4
- External IDs: OMIM: 605876; GeneCards: FCRL4

Gene location (Human)
Chr.	Chromosome 1 (human)
Band	1q23.1	Start	157,573,747 bp
Band	1q23.1	End	157,598,085 bp
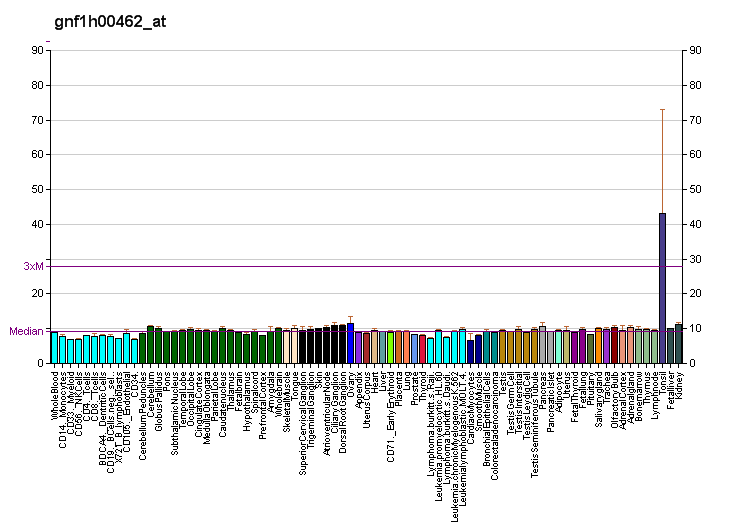
RNA expression pattern
Bgee	Human / Mouse (ortholog); Top expressed in: buccal mucosa cell; epithelium of nasopharynx; testicle; mucosa of ileum; appendix; lymph node; tibialis anterior muscle; tonsil; skin of thigh; deltoid muscle / n/a; More reference expression data
BioGPS	More reference expression data
Gene ontology
Molecular function	protein binding
Cellular component	integral component of membrane; plasma membrane; membrane; cell surface
Biological process	adaptive immune response; immune system process
Sources:Amigo / QuickGO
Orthologs
Databases	NCBI: entry; OMA: entry
Species	Human	Mouse
Entrez	83417	n/a
Ensembl	ENSG00000163518	n/a
UniProt	Q96PJ5	n/a
RefSeq (mRNA)	NM_031282	n/a
RefSeq (protein)	NP_112572	n/a
Location (UCSC)	Chr 1: 157.57 – 157.6 Mb	n/a
PubMed search		n/a
- Wikidata
View/Edit Human

Fc receptor-like protein 4 is a protein that in humans is encoded by the FCRL4 gene. FCRL4 is an inhibitory receptor expressed on human memory B cells which resides in epithelial tissues.
