= FCRL1 =

Protein-coding gene in humans

Identifiers
- Aliases: FCRL1, CD307a, FCRH1, IFGP1, IRTA5, Fc receptor like 1
- External IDs: OMIM: 606508; MGI: 2442862; GeneCards: FCRL1

Gene location (Human)
| Chr. | Chromosome 1 (human) |
| Band | 1q23.1 | Start | 157,794,403 bp |
| Band | 1q23.1 | End | 157,820,120 bp |

Gene location (Mouse)
| Chr. | Chromosome 3 (mouse) |
| Band | 3|3 F1 | Start | 87,283,694 bp |
| Band | 3|3 F1 | End | 87,310,241 bp |
RNA expression pattern
| Bgee | Human / Mouse (ortholog); Top expressed in: appendix; spleen; lymph node; granulocyte; buccal mucosa cell; bone marrow cell; blood; epithelium of nasopharynx; mucosa of ileum; tonsil / Top expressed in: spleen; mesenteric lymph nodes; blood; granulocyte; subcutaneous adipose tissue; embryo; bone marrow; thymus; Paneth cell; yolk sac; More reference expression data |
| BioGPS | n/a |
Gene ontology
| Molecular function | coreceptor activity |
| Cellular component | membrane; integral component of membrane; plasma membrane; cell surface |
| Biological process | signal transduction; B cell activation |
Sources:Amigo / QuickGO
Orthologs
| Databases | NCBI: entry; OMA: entry |
| Species | Human | Mouse |
| Entrez | 115350 | 229499 |
| Ensembl | ENSG00000163534 | ENSMUSG00000059994 |
| UniProt | Q96LA6 | Q8R4Y0 |
| RefSeq (mRNA) | NM_001159397; NM_001159398; NM_052938 | NM_001136236; NM_153090; NM_178165; NM_001310545 |
| RefSeq (protein) | NP_001152869; NP_001152870; NP_443170 | NP_001129708; NP_001297474; NP_694730; NP_835459 |
| Location (UCSC) | Chr 1: 157.79 – 157.82 Mb | Chr 3: 87.28 – 87.31 Mb |
| PubMed search |
- Wikidata
| View/Edit Human | View/Edit Mouse |

Fc receptor-like protein 1 is a protein that in humans is encoded by the FCRL1 gene.
