= FCRL5 =

Protein-coding gene in humans

Identifiers
- Aliases: FCRL5, BXMAS1, CD307, CD307e, FCRH5, IRTA2, PRO820, Fc receptor like 5
- External IDs: OMIM: 605877; MGI: 3053558; GeneCards: FCRL5

Gene location (Human)
Chr.	Chromosome 1 (human)
Band	1q23.1	Start	157,513,377 bp
Band	1q23.1	End	157,552,515 bp

Gene location (Mouse)
Chr.	Chromosome 3 (mouse)
Band	3|3 F1	Start	87,343,080 bp
Band	3|3 F1	End	87,407,985 bp
RNA expression pattern
Bgee	Human / Mouse (ortholog); Top expressed in: spleen; lymph node; bone marrow cell; granulocyte; mucosa of ileum; appendix; buccal mucosa cell; pylorus; tonsil; epithelium of nasopharynx / Top expressed in: spleen; embryo; blastocyst; thymus; jejunum; ovary; white adipose tissue; More reference expression data
BioGPS	n/a
Orthologs
Databases	NCBI: entry; OMA: entry
Species	Human	Mouse
Entrez	83416	329693
Ensembl	ENSG00000143297	ENSMUSG00000048031
UniProt	Q96RD9	Q68SN8
RefSeq (mRNA)	NM_001195388; NM_031281	NM_001113238; NM_183222
RefSeq (protein)	NP_001182317; NP_112571	NP_001106709; NP_899045
Location (UCSC)	Chr 1: 157.51 – 157.55 Mb	Chr 3: 87.34 – 87.41 Mb
PubMed search
- Wikidata
View/Edit Human	View/Edit Mouse

Fc receptor-like protein 5 is a protein that in humans is encoded by the FCRL5 gene. FCRL5 has also been designated as CD307 (cluster of differentiation 307).
