= Thomsen–Friedenreich antigen =

Thomsen–Friedenreich antigen (Galβ1-3GalNAcα1-Ser/Thr) is a disaccharide that serves as a core 1 structure in O-linked glycosylation. First described by Thomsen as a red blood cell's antigen, later research have determined it to be an oncofetal antigen. it is present in the body as a part of membrane transport proteins where it is normally masked from the immune system. It is commonly demasked in cancer cells, with it being expressed in up to 90% of carcinomas, making it a potential target for immunotherapy.
