= CD85 =

Group of genes

The term "CD85" was originally used to refer to LILR1 which is now known as CD85j; however, there are a number of CD85 genes:

CD85	Official LILR Nomenclature	ILT Nomenclature	Old LILT Nomenclature	Other Names
CD85i	LILRA1		LILR6 (LIR6)	
CD85h	LILRA2	ILT1	LILR7 (LIR7)	
CD85e	LILRA3	ILT6	LILR4 (LIR4)	HM31, HM43
CD85g	LILRA4	ILT7		
CD85j	LILRB1	ILT2	LILR1 (LIR1)	MIR7
CD85d	LILRB2	ILT4	LILR2 (LIR2)	MIR10
CD85a	LILRB3	ILT5	LILR3 (LIR3)	
CD85k	LILRB4	ILT3	LILR5	HM18
CD85c	LILRB5		LILR8	
CD85b		ILT8 or ILT9		
CD85m		ILT10		
CD85f		ILT11	LILR9	

LILR: leukocyte immunoglobulin-like receptor; ILT: immunoglobulin-like transcript; LIR: leukocyte inhibitory receptor; MIR: macrophage inhibitory receptor.
