= John Forssman =

Swedish pathologist and bacteriologist

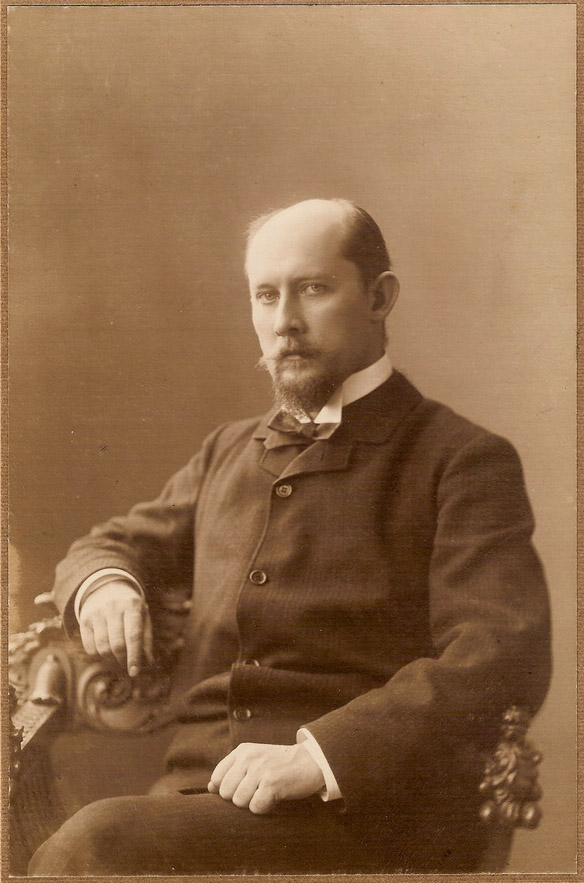
John Forssman (1868-1947)

Magnus John Karl August Forssman (22 November 1868 – 12 March 1947) was a Swedish pathologist and bacteriologist born in Kalmar.

He received his education at the University of Lund, where he later served as a professor of general pathology, bacteriology and public health science. From 1927 to 1930 he was director of the university hospital.

He is known for discovery of the "Forssman antigen", defined as a glycolipid heterophile antigen found on tissue cells of many animal species. It was first described for ovine red cells. It is not present in human, rat, rabbit, porcine or bovine cells. His name is also associated with the following two terms: "Forssman antibody" (heterophile antibody) and "Forssman reaction", also referred to as a "Forssman antigen-antibody reaction".

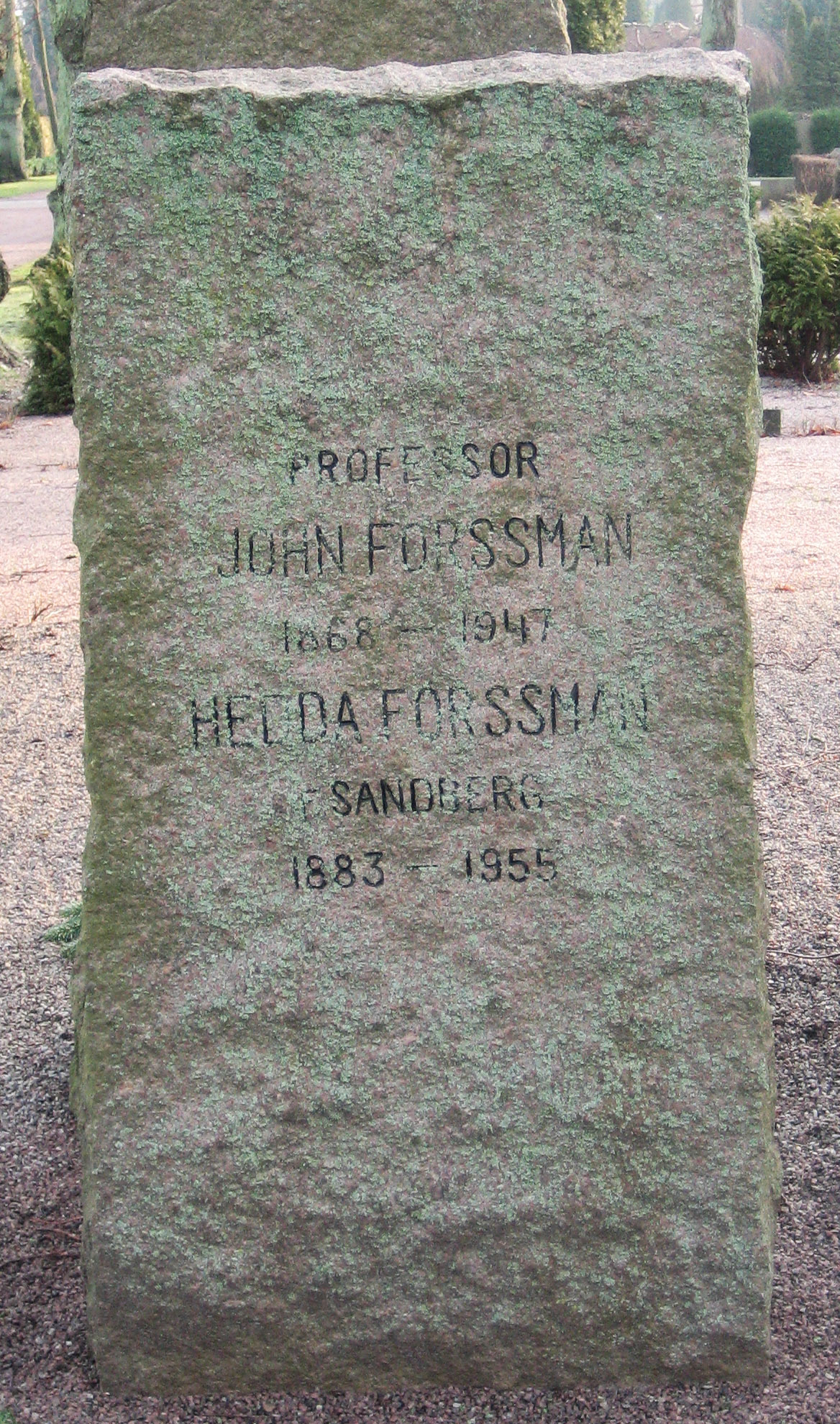
Grave of Forssman at Norra kyrkogården in Lund.

== Writings ==
- Über die Ursachen, welche die Wachsthumsrichtung der peripheren Nervenfasern bei der Regeneration bestimmen, 1898 - On the causes, of which the growth direction of peripheral nerve fibers are determined in regeneration.
- Studien über die Antitoxinbildung bei aktiver Immunisierung gegen Botulismus (in Centralblatt für Bakteriologie, 1905) - Studies on antitoxin formation for active immunization against botulism.
- Untersuchungen über die lysinbildung (med Bång, in Hofmeisters Beiträge, 1906) - Studies on lysine production.
- Om therapeutisk vaccinbehandling, 1916 - On therapeutic vaccine treatment.
- Pathogena bakteriers, infektioners och vissa epidemiers beroende av främmande bakterier, 1918 - Bacterial pathogens, etc.
