= HLA-C =

Protein-coding gene in the species Homo sapiens

Identifiers
- Aliases: HLA-C, D6S204, HLA-JY3, HLC-C, PSORS1, major histocompatibility complex, class I, C, MHC
- External IDs: OMIM: 142840; GeneCards: HLA-C
Available structures
PDB	Human UniProt search: PDBe RCSB
PDB	List of PDB id codes 3BZF,%%s4NT6,%%s1EFX,%%s1IM9, 1QQD

Gene location (Human)
Chr.	Chromosome 6 (human)
Band	6p21.33	Start	31,268,749 bp
Band	6p21.33	End	31,272,130 bp
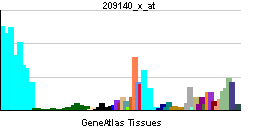
RNA expression pattern
Bgee	Human / Mouse (ortholog); Top expressed in: blood; right lung; spleen; granulocyte; right uterine tube; appendix; bone marrow; upper lobe of left lung; lymph node; bone marrow cell / n/a; More reference expression data
BioGPS	More reference expression data
Gene ontology
Molecular function	peptide antigen binding; protein binding
Cellular component	integral component of membrane; phagocytic vesicle membrane; Golgi apparatus; early endosome membrane; membrane; Golgi membrane; plasma membrane; cell surface; endoplasmic reticulum; MHC class I protein complex; ER to Golgi transport vesicle membrane; integral component of lumenal side of endoplasmic reticulum membrane; extracellular exosome; secretory granule membrane; recycling endosome membrane
Biological process	antigen processing and presentation; antigen processing and presentation of exogenous peptide antigen via MHC class I, TAP-dependent; immune system process; interferon-gamma-mediated signaling pathway; antigen processing and presentation of peptide antigen via MHC class I; antigen processing and presentation of exogenous peptide antigen via MHC class I, TAP-independent; type I interferon signaling pathway; immune response; regulation of immune response; viral process; neutrophil degranulation
Sources:Amigo / QuickGO
Orthologs
Databases	NCBI: entry; OMA: entry
Species	Human	Mouse
Entrez	3107	n/a
Ensembl	ENSG00000204525; ENSG00000233841; ENSG00000228299; ENSG00000225691; ENSG00000206435 ENSG00000237022; ENSG00000206452	n/a
UniProt	P10321	n/a
RefSeq (mRNA)	NM_002117; NM_001243042	n/a
RefSeq (protein)	NP_001229971; NP_002108	n/a
Location (UCSC)	Chr 6: 31.27 – 31.27 Mb	n/a
PubMed search		n/a
- Wikidata
View/Edit Human

HLA-C (Human Leukocyte Antigen-C) belongs to the MHC class I heavy chain receptors. The C receptor is a heterodimer consisting of a HLA-C mature gene product and β2-microglobulin. The mature C chain is anchored in the membrane. MHC Class I molecules, like HLA-C, are expressed in nearly all cells, and present small peptides to the immune system which surveys for non-self peptides.

HLA-C is a locus on chromosome 6, which encodes for many HLA-C alleles that are Class-I MHC receptors. HLA-C, localized proximal to the HLA-B locus, is located on the distal end of the HLA region. Most HLA-C:B haplotypes are in strong linkage disequilibrium and many are as ancient as the human species itself.

== Disease associations ==
=== By serotype ===
Cw1: multinodular goiters

=== By allele ===
C*16: B-cell chronic lymphocytic leukemia

== Nomenclature ==
C*01

- Cw1 serotype: C*01:02 and C*01:09
- Cw11
- C*01:04 to *01:08

C*02

- Cw2 serotype: C*02:02 and *02:08
- C*02:03 to *02:07, and 02:09

C*03

- Cw9 serotype: C*03:03
- Cw10 serotype: C*03:02, *03:04, and *03:06
- Cw3 serotype: C*03:07
- C*03:05 and 03:08

C*04

- Cw4 serotype: C*0401, *0407, and *0410

C*05

- Cw5 serotype: C*05:01 and *05:02
- C*05:03 to *05:06 and *05:08 to *05:10

C*06

- Cw6 serotype: C*06:02 and *06:05
- C*06:03, *06:04 and *06:06 to *06:11

C*07

- Cw7 serotype: C*07:01 to *07:06, *07:12, *07:14, *07:16
- C*07:07 to *07:11, *07:13, *07:15, and *07:17 to *07:29

C*08

- Cw8 serotype: C*08:01, *08:02 and *08:03
- C*08:05 to *08:12

Others

- C*12:02 to *12:15
- C*14:02 to *14:05
- C*15:01 to *15:11
- C*16:01 to *16:06
- C*17:01 to *17:03
- C*18:01 and *18:02

== Common haplotype ==
Cw4-B35 (Western Africa to Native Americans) Cw7-B7 (Western Eurasia, South Africa) Cw7-B8 (Western Eurasia) Cw1-B46 (China, Indochina) Cw5-B44 (Western Eurasia)

== Interactions ==
HLA-C has been shown to interact with:

- KIR2DL1,
- Leukocyte immunoglobulin-like receptor family:
  - particularly the activating receptor LILRA1
  - LILRA3
