= Leukocyte immunoglobulin-like receptors =

Identifiers
- Symbol: LILR
- Membranome: 17

Leukocyte immunoglobulin-like receptors (LILRs) are a diverse family of cell surface proteins predominantly expressed on various immune cells such as monocytes, macrophages, dendritic cells, and subsets of B and T lymphocytes. These receptors play crucial roles in regulating immune responses through both activating and inhibitory mechanisms. LILRs are integral to maintaining immune homeostasis, preventing autoimmunity, and responding to infections and tumors.

Structurally, LILRs are characterized by extracellular immunoglobulin (Ig)-like domains and cytoplasmic tails that either contain immunoreceptor tyrosine-based inhibitory motifs (ITIMs) or associate with activating adaptor proteins. The balance of LILR signaling helps tune the immune threshold and contributes to various immune processes ranging from tolerance to inflammation and pathogen clearance.

LILRs are encoded in the leukocyte receptor complex (LRC) located on chromosome 19q13.4, a region that also contains other immunoregulatory receptors. Their classification includes activating receptors (LILRA subfamily) and inhibitory receptors (LILRB subfamily), each recognizing a variety of ligands including classical and non-classical major histocompatibility complex (MHC) class I molecules.

They include

- LILRA1
- LILRA2
- LILRA3
- LILRA4
- LILRA5
- LILRA6
- LILRB1
- LILRB2
- LILRB3
- LILRB4
- LILRB5
- LILRB6 or LILRA6
- LILRB7 or LILRA5

== Structure and Classification ==
The LILR family is divided into two main subgroups:

- LILRA (Activating Receptors): These receptors have short cytoplasmic tails and lack ITIMs. Instead, they associate with Fc receptor common gamma chains (FcRγ) or other activating adaptors via a charged residue in the transmembrane region. Members include LILRA1 through LILRA6.
- LILRB (Inhibitory Receptors): These receptors possess long cytoplasmic tails with multiple ITIM motifs. Upon ligand binding, they recruit phosphatases like SHP-1 and SHP-2, which dephosphorylate signaling intermediates to dampen cellular activation. LILRB1 through LILRB5 belong to this subgroup.

Most LILRs contain two or four Ig-like extracellular domains and a transmembrane region. Some can bind both classical (HLA-A, -B, -C) and non-classical (HLA-E, -F, -G) MHC class I molecules, while others show specificity for free heavy chains of MHC molecules.

== Regulation of Innate and Adaptive Immunity ==
In Innate Immune Regulation, the LILRB's play a role as a switch which prevents tissue damage. The mechanism consists of:

- LILRBs that are found in macrophages, neutrophils, and dendritic cells, use ITM motifs to recruit enzymes which cancel out the activation signal of inflammation or cell activation which harm the tissues. Specifically, SHP1/2 down regulate the activating signaling pathways, thus preventing the immune system from attacking the body's self tissues.

In Adaptive Immune Regulation, the LILRBs control T and B cell behavior. The mechanism consists of:

- LILRB1 and LILBR2 compete with CD8 (a transmembrane glycoprotein found on cytotoxic T cells) to bind to MHC I. This would physically block the signal and activate the T cell. The high expression of LILBRs would promote T cell differentiation which would strengthen the body's ability to recognize and accept its tissues.

== Genetic Organization ==
LILRs are encoded in a tightly clustered region known as the leukocyte receptor complex (LRC) on chromosome 19q13.4. This locus contains genes with high sequence similarity and evidence of duplication events, supporting the idea that these receptors have evolved rapidly in response to pathogenic pressures.

The close linkage of LILRs with killer-cell immunoglobulin-like receptors (KIRs) and other immune regulatory genes suggests coordinated regulation and functional interplay in innate immunity.

== Ligands and Binding Specificity ==
A defining feature of LILRs is their ligand diversity:

- LILRB1 and LILRB2 bind to a broad range of classical and non-classical MHC class I molecules in complex with β₂-microglobulin.
- LILRA1 and LILRA3, in contrast, recognize MHC class I heavy chains devoid of β₂-microglobulin, enabling detection of stress or pathological conditions that disrupt MHC stability.

Beyond MHC molecules, certain LILRs bind to viral proteins, self-lipids, or damage-associated molecular patterns (DAMPs), implying a broader role in sensing both self and non-self entities.

== LILRB Interactions ==
- Ligand Diversity: LILRBs recognize a variety of ligands in which involve classical and non-classical MHC class I, proteins, inhibitors. These different ligands bind to different epitopes on the receptor in which a specific conformational change that changes the signaling molecules. This can cause a reaction whether to deplete or increase the strength of a signaling pathway.
- Receptors: LILRBs can interact with other receptors, whether cis or trans which modulates the inhibitory the feedback signaling. This means that LILRB is very diverse in terms of binding to cells within or outside of its cell.
- Cell-Specific Signaling: Based on the cell type, there are different concentrations of intracellular signaling molecules. This means indicates that the same LILRB receptor might have a stronger inhibitory effect in a macrophage than in a B cell.

== Expression and Cellular Distribution ==
LILRs are expressed variably across immune cell types:

- Monocytes and macrophages: Express both activating and inhibitory LILRs, modulating responses to infection and inflammation.
- Dendritic cells: Use LILRs to regulate maturation, antigen presentation, and cytokine production.
- B cells and T cells: Express select LILRs (e.g., LILRB1), influencing adaptive immune responses.
- NK cells: Some subsets express LILRB1 and LIL

== Real-Life Examples of Diseases and their Correlation to LILRs ==
- In kidney transplantation, LILRB4 send inhibitory signals that reduce the activation of signals that are sent to prevent rejection. This shifts the endothelial cells that trigger the attack on grafts. When LILRB4 levels increase, it reduces signals that reduce adhesion molecules, thus leading to reduction of graft rejection. This is a real life example of a transplantation process and how the body utilizes LILRs to prevent to a rejection.

== Biological Functions and Immune Modulation ==
Leukocyte immunoglobulin-like receptors (LILRs) calibrate immune responses across both innate and adaptive systems through two complementary mechanisms:

- Inhibitory LILRBs (e.g., LILRB1–B5) contain immunoreceptor tyrosine-based inhibitory motifs (ITIMs). Upon ligand binding, these receptors recruit SHP-1/2 phosphatases, which attenuate cell activation, reduce phagocytosis, and suppress inflammatory signaling pathways such as PI3K/AKT cascades
- Activating LILRAs (e.g., LILRA1–A6) lack ITIMs but pair with ITAM-bearing adaptor proteins, like FcRγ, via a charged transmembrane residue, thus triggering phosphorylation cascades that potentiate cytokine release, cell maturation, and cytotoxic responses.

Key Roles:

- Monocytes/macrophages: Express LILRB1 and LILRB2 which are expressed on the myeloid lineage cells, sense “self” via MHC I, inhibiting phagocytosis when engaging self-structures, thereby preventing auto-aggression. During infection, activating LILRAs help override this inhibition to enable pathogen clearance.
- Dendritic cells: Balance between activation and tolerance is mediated by LILR expression; outcome determines whether immune responses are immunogenic or tolerogenic.
- NK, B, and T lymphocytes: Particularly express inhibitory LILRBs (e.g., LILRB1/B2), which dampen cytotoxicity and antibody production, thus avoiding collateral tissue damage.
- LILRBs are linked to diagnostics. LILRB1, LILRB2, LILRB3 are expressed on monocytes and detect Antibody-Mediated Rejection (AMR), and by measuring the levels of LILRB1 and LILRB2 in a persons body (high or low levels), physicians can predict whether a kidney translate is failing or not.

These regulatory mechanisms ensure immune responses remain specific yet nonpathogenic.

A subset of LILR recognise MHC class I (also known as HLA class I in humans). The LILR family is a cluster of paired receptors with both activating and inhibitory functions. Of these, the inhibitory receptors LILRB1 and LILRB2 show a broad specificity for classical and non-classical MHC alleles with preferential binding to b2m-associated complexes. In contrast, the activating receptors LILRA1 and LILRA3 prefer b2m-independent free heavy chains of MHC class I, and in particular HLA-C alleles.

== See also ==
- LAIR1
- Killer-cell immunoglobulin-like receptor
