= Heterophile antigen =

Similar antigens present in different tissues and species

Heterophile antigens are antigens of similar nature, if not identical, that are present in different tissues in different biological species, classes, or kingdoms. Usually different species have different antigen sets, but the hetereophile antigen is shared by different species. Other heterophile antigens are responsible for some diagnostic serological tests such as:

- Weil-Felix reaction for typhus fever
- Paul Bunnell test for infectious mononucleosis
- Cold agglutinin test in primary atypical pneumonia

Chemically, heterophile antigens are composed of lipoprotein-polysaccharide complexes. There is a possibility of there being identical chemical groupings in the structure of mucopolysaccharids and lipids. Example: Forssman antigen, cross reacting microbial antigen so antibodies to these antigens produced by one species cross react with antigens of other species. It is widely present in some plants bacteria animal and birds. However it is not present in rabbit. Therefore antibodies are produced in rabbit serum by injecting the antigen (antiforssman antibodies).
