= FCRL3 =

Protein-coding gene in humans

Identifiers
- Aliases: FCRL3, CD307c, FCRH3, IFGP3, IRTA3, SPAP2, Fc receptor like 3
- External IDs: OMIM: 606510; GeneCards: FCRL3

Gene location (Human)
Chr.	Chromosome 1 (human)
Band	1q23.1	Start	157,674,321 bp
Band	1q23.1	End	157,700,769 bp
RNA expression pattern
Bgee	Human / Mouse (ortholog); Top expressed in: mucosa of ileum; granulocyte; lymph node; spleen; appendix; testicle; blood; epithelium of nasopharynx; tonsil; bone marrow cell / n/a; More reference expression data
BioGPS	n/a
Gene ontology
Molecular function	kinase binding; phosphatase binding; protein phosphatase binding; protein tyrosine kinase binding
Cellular component	membrane; integral component of membrane; plasma membrane; cell surface
Biological process	negative regulation of immunoglobulin production; positive regulation of B cell proliferation; regulation of toll-like receptor 9 signaling pathway; positive regulation of MAPK cascade; regulation of B cell differentiation; negative regulation of B cell receptor signaling pathway; regulation of B cell activation; regulation of calcium ion import; positive regulation of protein serine/threonine phosphatase activity
Sources:Amigo / QuickGO
Orthologs
Databases	NCBI: entry; OMA: entry
Species	Human	Mouse
Entrez	115352	n/a
Ensembl	ENSG00000160856	n/a
UniProt	Q96P31	n/a
RefSeq (mRNA)	NM_001024667; NM_052939; NM_001320333	n/a
RefSeq (protein)	NP_001307262; NP_443171	n/a
Location (UCSC)	Chr 1: 157.67 – 157.7 Mb	n/a
PubMed search		n/a
- Wikidata
View/Edit Human

Fc receptor-like protein 3 is a protein that in humans is encoded by the FCRL3 gene.

This gene encodes a member of the immunoglobulin receptor superfamily and is one of several Fc receptor-like glycoproteins clustered on the long arm of chromosome 1. The encoded protein contains immunoreceptor-tyrosine activation motif (ITAM) and immunoreceptor-tyrosine inhibitory motif (ITIM) in its cytoplasmic domain and may play a role in regulation of the immune system. Mutations in this gene have been associated with rheumatoid arthritis, autoimmune thyroid disease, and systemic lupus erythematosus.

== Expression ==
Fc receptor-like protein 3 is preferentially expressed on B cell, and is along the FCRL6 the only gene from this family which is expressed also outside B-cell lineage, as it has been detected also on NK cell and T cell subsets. The rest of the Fc receptor-like family are considered B cell markers.

It is expressed in relatively low levels on naïve B cells, germinal center B cells, memory B cells, marginal zone B cells and peripheral blood and tonsil B-cells, and at slightly higher levels on splenic naïve and memory B cells. Its expression was not detected on pro-B cells, pre-B cells and bone marrow-derived plasmatic B cells.

Highest levels of FCRL3 expression were detected on circulating memory B cells, as well as innate-like marginal zone B cells. Memory B cell subsets with innate-like properties have also been observed to have higher FCRL3 expression, which had a potent co-stimmulatory effect on TLR9-mediated B cell activation, as well as activation and inhibitory effect on plasma cell differentiation.

Outside B cell lineage, FCLR3 expression has been detected on CD56^{+} natural killer cells, CD4^{+} and CD8^{+} T cells, as well as regulatory CD4^{+}FOXP3^{+} T cells. Notably, it has also been observed on a subpopulation of natural Treg (nTreg) cells with high expression levels of PD-1, which had impaired IL-2 responsiveness, and also on Helios Treg cells, where it was co-expressed with T-cell immunoreceptor with Ig and ITIM domains (TIGIT).

== Structure ==
Fc receptor-like protein 3 is a type I transmembrane glycoprotein, which consists of an extracellular region, a transmembrane domain and a cytoplasmatic tail. The extracellular region consists of five immunoglobulin-like domains, which share varying degree of homology to extracellular domains of other Fc receptor-like protein family members, as well as extracellular domains of Fc receptors FcγRI, FcγRII and FcγRIII.

The transmembrane region consists of hydrophobic residues and is uncharged.

The cytoplasmatic region contains two signalling motifs, a membrane-proximal ITAM and a carboxy-proximal ITAM-like motif. The presence of both an activating and inhibitory motifs suggests potential dual-signalling properties.

== Function ==
Given its dual-signalling properties, FCRL3 mediates BCR signalling as well as plasma B cell maturation and antibody production.

FCRL3 has been shown to interact with PTPN6.

== Signalling ==
Fc receptor-like protein 3 has a role in regulation in both innate and adaptive signalling pathways in association with other signalling molecules. It contains both an activation (ITAM-like) and an inhibitory (ITIM) motif in its cytoplasmic region, pointing to its dual-regulatory potential. FCRL3 is capable of associating with intracellular signalling molecules including Syk, Zap-70, SHP-1, and SHP-2.

Activation properties of FCRL3 were observed in relation to TLR9-mediated signalling. FCRL3 engagement with receptor-specific monoclonal antibodies (mAbs) augmented TLR9-mediated blood B cell survival, proliferation and activation. It led to improved expression of activation markers CD25, CD86 and HLA-DR on cell surface via CpG-mediated NFκB and MAPK pathways activation. Expression of CD54 and CD80 was not significantly altered by this ligation. CpG signalling could potentially enhance differentiation of B cells into Ig-secreting plasma cells. But, FCRL3 ligation with mAbs halted differentiation of antibody secreting plasma B cells by inhibiting B-lymphocyte-induced maturation protein 1 (BLIMP1) expression via Erk signalling pathway.

Inhibitory role of FCRL3 has been described in its negative regulation of B-cell receptor (BCR) signalling. Co-ligation of FCRL3 with BCR facilitates SHP-1 and SHP-2 recruitment via its intracellular ITIM motif. This leads to inhibition of Syk kinase and PLCγ2 phosphorylation, which suppresses downstream calcium signalling and apoptosis.

FCRL3 has no known ligands.

== Clinical signficance ==
The FCRL3 loci is associated with numerous autoimmune diseases. Single-nucleotide polymorphism (SNP) -169 C/T located in promoter region of FCRL3 has been linked to higher susceptibility to diseases including rheumatoid arthritis (RA), systemic lupus erythematosus (SLE) and autoimmune thyroid disease. This polymorphism enhanced expression levels of FCRL3 via more efficient NFκB binding and increased promoted activity.

Elevated expression levels of FCRL3 on Treg cells, cytotoxic CD8^{+} T cells and γδ-T cells are associated with rheumatoid arthritis.

FCRL3 gene polymorphism is also associated with multiple sclerosis, autoimmune pancreatitis, type I diabetes and Bahcet's disease in various populations.

Thymus derived FCRL3^{+} Treg were observed to have higher PD-1 expression and lower responsiveness to antigenic stimulation, as well as reduced suppression properties on effector T cell proliferation. FCRL3 expression on Treg cells is also associated with -169 C/T SNP in FCRL3 promoter region. Overall, FCRL3 expression on Treg cells leads to dysfunction in regulation of self-tolerance and increases susceptibility to autoimmunity.

FCRL3 is considered an autoimmunity marker.
