= PTPN6 =

Protein-coding gene in humans

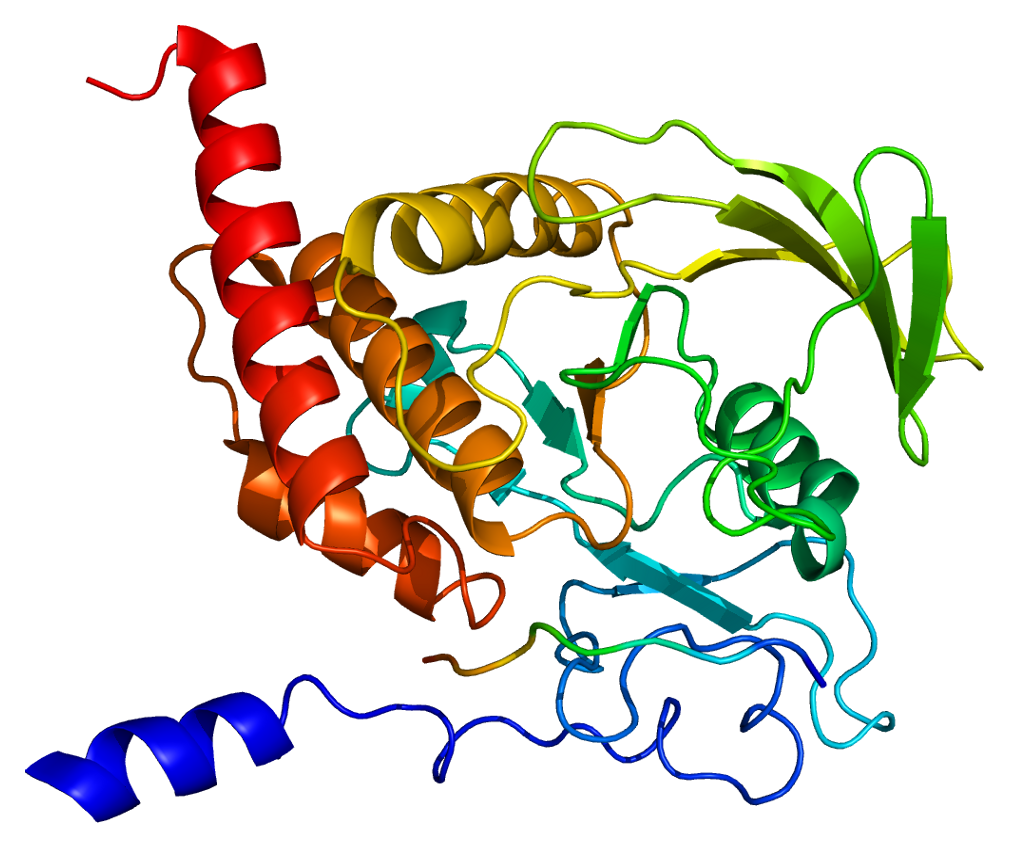

Identifiers
- Aliases: PTPN6, HCP, HCPH, HPTP1C, PTP-1C, SH-PTP1, SHP-1, SHP-1L, SHP1, protein tyrosine phosphatase, non-receptor type 6, protein tyrosine phosphatase non-receptor type 6
- External IDs: OMIM: 176883; MGI: 96055; GeneCards: PTPN6
Available structures
PDB	Ortholog search: PDBe RCSB
PDB	List of PDB id codes 1FPR, 1GWZ, 1X6C, 2B3O, 2RMX, 2YU7, 3PS5, 4GRY, 4GRZ, 4GS0, 4HJP, 4HJQ
Enzyme activity
EC #	BRENDA	ExPASy	KEGG	MetaCyc
3.1.3.48	↗	↗	↗	↗

Gene location (Human)
Chr.	Chromosome 12 (human)
Band	12p13.31	Start	6,946,468 bp
Band	12p13.31	End	6,961,316 bp

Gene location (Mouse)
Chr.	Chromosome 6 (mouse)
Band	6 F2|6 59.17 cM	Start	124,697,670 bp
Band	6 F2|6 59.17 cM	End	124,715,677 bp
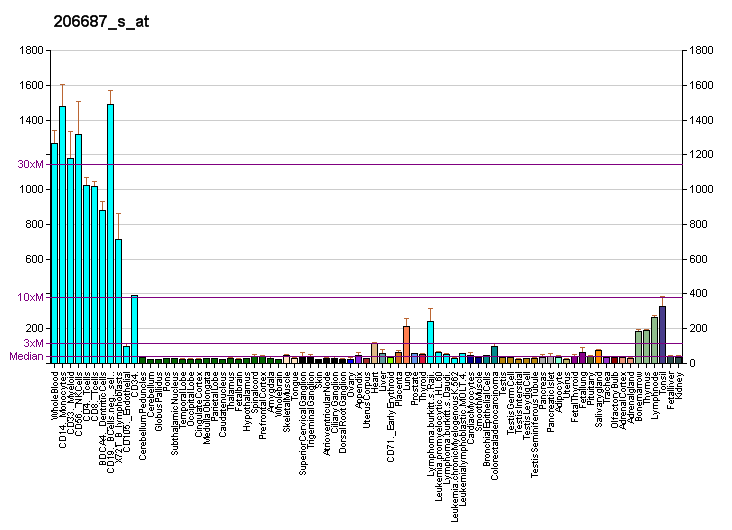
RNA expression pattern
Bgee	Human / Mouse (ortholog); Top expressed in: granulocyte; spleen; monocyte; blood; bone marrow cell; appendix; lymph node; mucosa of transverse colon; right lung; upper lobe of left lung / Top expressed in: granulocyte; spleen; thymus; mesenteric lymph nodes; blood; tibiofemoral joint; stroma of bone marrow; gastrula; right lung lobe; right kidney; More reference expression data
BioGPS	More reference expression data
Gene ontology
Molecular function	phosphoprotein phosphatase activity; SH3 domain binding; phosphatase activity; phosphotyrosine residue binding; SH2 domain binding; protein binding; transmembrane receptor protein tyrosine phosphatase activity; hydrolase activity; protein kinase binding; cell adhesion molecule binding; protein tyrosine phosphatase activity; phosphorylation-dependent protein binding
Cellular component	cytoplasm; cytosol; membrane; cell-cell junction; alpha-beta T cell receptor complex; nucleolus; extracellular exosome; nucleus; extracellular region; specific granule lumen; tertiary granule lumen; nucleoplasm; protein-containing complex
Biological process	B cell receptor signaling pathway; megakaryocyte development; G protein-coupled receptor signaling pathway; cell differentiation; intracellular signal transduction; regulation of release of sequestered calcium ion into cytosol; abortive mitotic cell cycle; T cell costimulation; protein dephosphorylation; platelet formation; negative regulation of T cell receptor signaling pathway; platelet activation; negative regulation of humoral immune response mediated by circulating immunoglobulin; regulation of G1/S transition of mitotic cell cycle; negative regulation of T cell proliferation; regulation of type I interferon-mediated signaling pathway; negative regulation of peptidyl-tyrosine phosphorylation; negative regulation of MAP kinase activity; hematopoietic progenitor cell differentiation; positive regulation of cell population proliferation; negative regulation of MAPK cascade; regulation of ERK1 and ERK2 cascade; negative regulation of B cell receptor signaling pathway; peptidyl-tyrosine phosphorylation; positive regulation of phosphatidylinositol 3-kinase signaling; positive regulation of cell adhesion mediated by integrin; cell population proliferation; platelet aggregation; regulation of B cell differentiation; leukocyte migration; natural killer cell mediated cytotoxicity; negative regulation of cell population proliferation; dephosphorylation; apoptotic process; neutrophil degranulation; peptidyl-tyrosine dephosphorylation; cytokine-mediated signaling pathway; negative regulation of interleukin-6 production; negative regulation of tumor necrosis factor production; cellular response to cytokine stimulus
Sources:Amigo / QuickGO
Orthologs
Databases	NCBI: entry; OMA: entry
Species	Human	Mouse
Entrez	5777	15170
Ensembl	ENSG00000111679	ENSMUSG00000004266
UniProt	P29350	P29351
RefSeq (mRNA)	NM_002831; NM_080548; NM_080549	NM_001077705; NM_013545
RefSeq (protein)	NP_002822; NP_536858; NP_536859	NP_001071173; NP_038573
Location (UCSC)	Chr 12: 6.95 – 6.96 Mb	Chr 6: 124.7 – 124.72 Mb
PubMed search
- Wikidata
View/Edit Human	View/Edit Mouse

Tyrosine-protein phosphatase non-receptor type 6, also known as Src homology region 2 domain-containing phosphatase-1 (SHP-1), is an enzyme that in humans is encoded by the PTPN6 gene.

== Function ==
The protein encoded by this gene is a member of the protein tyrosine phosphatase (PTP) family. PTPs are known to be signaling molecules that regulate a variety of cellular processes including cell growth, differentiation, mitotic cycle, and oncogenic transformation. N-terminal part of this PTP contains two tandem Src homolog (SH2) domains, which act as protein phospho-tyrosine binding domains, and mediate the interaction of this PTP with its substrates. This PTP is expressed primarily in hematopoietic cells, and functions as an important regulator of multiple signaling pathways in hematopoietic cells. This PTP has been shown to interact with, and dephosphorylate a wide spectrum of phospho-proteins involved in hematopoietic cell signaling, (e.g., the LYN-CD22-SHP-1 pathway). Multiple alternatively spliced variants of this gene, which encode distinct isoforms, have been reported.

== Expression ==
SHP-1 gene has two promoters: P-1, active in epithelial cells, and P-2, active in hemopoietic cells. In addition the expression of SHP-1 is low in epithelial cells and high in hemopoietic cells. SHP-1 level in epithelial cells increases and in hematopoietic cells decreases in cancer.

== Interactions ==
PTPN6 has been shown to interact with:

- BCR gene,
- CD117,
- CD22,
- CD31,
- CTNND1,
- EGFR,
- EPOR,
- FCRL3,
- Grb2,
- HOXA10,
- JAK2,
- LAIR1,
- LILRB2,
- LILRB4,
- Lck,
- LCP2,
- PRKCD,
- PTK2B,
- ROS1,
- SIRPA,
- SYK, and
- TYK2.
