= LILRA5 =

Protein-coding gene in the species Homo sapiens

Identifiers
- Aliases: LILRA5, CD85, CD85F, ILT-11, ILT11, LILRB7, LIR-9, LIR9, leukocyte immunoglobulin like receptor A5
- External IDs: OMIM: 606047; MGI: 3647196; GeneCards: LILRA5
Available structures
PDB	Ortholog search: PDBe RCSB
PDB	List of PDB id codes 2D3V

Gene location (Human)
Chr.	Chromosome 19 (human)
Band	19q13.42	Start	54,307,070 bp
Band	19q13.42	End	54,313,166 bp

Gene location (Mouse)
Chr.	Chromosome 7 (mouse)
Band	7|7 A1	Start	4,240,753 bp
Band	7|7 A1	End	4,246,462 bp
RNA expression pattern
Bgee	Human / Mouse (ortholog); Top expressed in: blood; monocyte; granulocyte; spleen; bone marrow; bone marrow cell; appendix; right lung; upper lobe of left lung; testicle / Top expressed in: trigeminal ganglion; spinal ganglia; liver; adrenal gland; jejunum; spleen; ileum; lung; right kidney; spinal cord; More reference expression data
BioGPS	n/a
Orthologs
Databases	NCBI: entry; OMA: entry
Species	Human	Mouse
Entrez	353514	232801
Ensembl	ENSG00000274113; ENSG00000274914; ENSG00000275404; ENSG00000187116; ENSG00000278355 n/a	ENSMUSG00000070873
UniProt	A6NI73	D3Z7A9
RefSeq (mRNA)	NM_181986; NM_021250; NM_181879; NM_181985	NM_001081239
RefSeq (protein)	NP_067073; NP_870994; NP_871714; NP_871715	NP_001074708
Location (UCSC)	Chr 19: 54.31 – 54.31 Mb	Chr 7: 4.24 – 4.25 Mb
PubMed search
- Wikidata
View/Edit Human	View/Edit Mouse

Leukocyte immunoglobulin-like receptor subfamily A member 5 (LILR-A5) also known as CD85 antigen-like family member F (CD85f), immunoglobulin-like transcript 11 (ILT-11), and leukocyte immunoglobulin-like receptor 9 (LIR-9) is a protein that in humans is encoded by the LILRA5 gene. This gene is one of the leukocyte receptor genes that form a gene cluster on the chromosomal region 19q13.4. Four alternatively spliced transcript variants encoding distinct isoforms have been described.

== Function ==
The function of LILRA5 is currently unknown. However, it is highly homologous to other LILR genes, thus it is assumed to have similar functions to other LIR family members, i.e. activating and inhibitory functions in leukocytes. Crosslink of this receptor protein on the surface of monocytes has been shown to induce calcium flux and secretion of several proinflammatory cytokines, which suggests the roles of this protein in triggering innate immune responses.

== Clinical significance ==
A recent genome-wide association study (GWAS) has found that genetic variations in LILRA5 are associated with late-onset sporadic Alzheimer's disease (LOAD).

LILBR2 plays a critical role in the inhibition of axonal regeneration and functional recovery after brain injury. However, recent studies demonstrate that LILRB2 is a β-Amyloid receptor and may contribute to synaptic loss and cognitive impairment in Alzheimer's disease. Due to its proximity to LILRB2, it is believed that LILRA5 mutation may also contribute to Alzheimer's disease.
