= LAIR1 =

Protein-coding gene in the species Homo sapiens

Identifiers
- Aliases: LAIR1, CD305, LAIR-1, leukocyte associated immunoglobulin like receptor 1
- External IDs: OMIM: 602992; MGI: 105492; GeneCards: LAIR1
Available structures
PDB	Ortholog search: PDBe RCSB
PDB	List of PDB id codes 3KGR, 3RP1

Gene location (Human)
Chr.	Chromosome 19 (human)
Band	19q13.42	Start	54,351,384 bp
Band	19q13.42	End	54,370,558 bp

Gene location (Mouse)
Chr.	Chromosome 7 (mouse)
Band	7 A1|7 2.31 cM	Start	4,006,401 bp
Band	7 A1|7 2.31 cM	End	4,066,203 bp
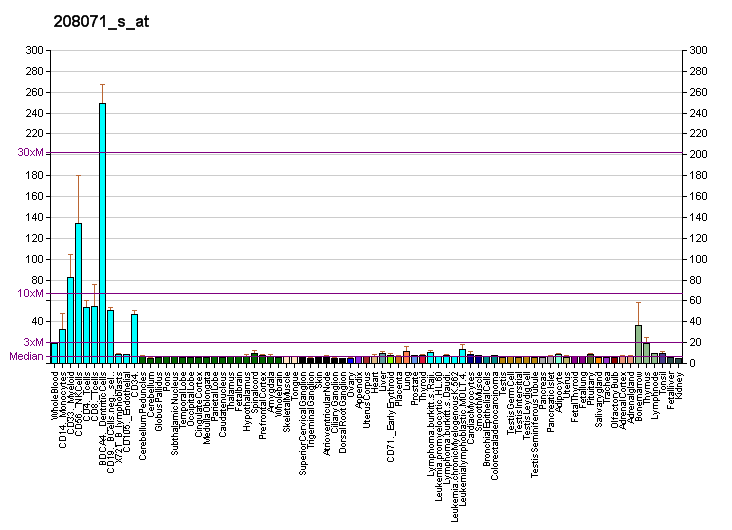

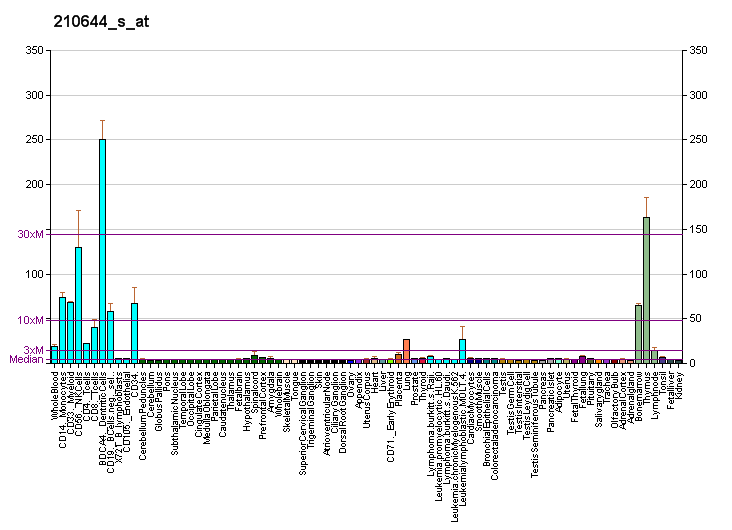
RNA expression pattern
Bgee	Human / Mouse (ortholog); Top expressed in: granulocyte; appendix; monocyte; spleen; blood; lymph node; bone marrow; right lung; placenta; upper lobe of left lung / Top expressed in: granulocyte; spleen; stroma of bone marrow; zygote; mesenteric lymph nodes; secondary oocyte; lumbar subsegment of spinal cord; blood; supraoptic nucleus; thymus; More reference expression data
BioGPS	More reference expression data
Gene ontology
Molecular function	protein binding
Cellular component	integral component of membrane; plasma membrane; membrane; specific granule membrane; tertiary granule membrane
Biological process	adaptive immune response; regulation of immune response; immune system process; neutrophil degranulation
Sources:Amigo / QuickGO
Orthologs
Databases	NCBI: entry; OMA: entry
Species	Human	Mouse
Entrez	3903	52855
Ensembl	ENSG00000276053; ENSG00000276163; ENSG00000278154; ENSG00000274110; ENSG00000167613 n/a	ENSMUSG00000055541
UniProt	Q6GTX8	Q8BG84
RefSeq (mRNA)	NM_001289023; NM_001289025; NM_001289026; NM_001289027; NM_002287 NM_021706; NM_021708	NM_001113474; NM_178611; NM_001302675; NM_001302676; NM_001302677 NM_001302681; NM_001302682; NM_001302683
RefSeq (protein)	NP_001275952; NP_001275954; NP_001275955; NP_001275956; NP_002278 NP_068352	NP_001106945; NP_001289604; NP_001289605; NP_001289606; NP_001289610 NP_001289611; NP_001289612; NP_848726
Location (UCSC)	Chr 19: 54.35 – 54.37 Mb	Chr 7: 4.01 – 4.07 Mb
PubMed search
- Wikidata
View/Edit Human	View/Edit Mouse

Leukocyte-associated immunoglobulin-like receptor 1 is a protein that in humans is encoded by the LAIR1 gene. LAIR1 has also been designated as CD305 (cluster of differentiation 305).

== Function ==
The protein encoded by this gene is an inhibitory receptor found on peripheral mononuclear cells, including NK cells, T cells, and B cells. Inhibitory receptors regulate the immune response to prevent lysis of cells recognized as self. The gene is a member of both the immunoglobulin superfamily and the leukocyte-associated inhibitory receptor family. The gene maps to a region of 19q13.4 called the leukocyte receptor cluster, which contains at least 29 genes encoding leukocyte-expressed receptors of the immunoglobulin superfamily.

== Interactions ==
LAIR1 has been shown to interact with PTPN11 and PTPN6.
