= Forssman antigen =

The Forssman antigen is a glycolipid heterophile antigen found in certain animals like dogs, horses, cats, turtles and sheep, and enteric organisms such as pneumococci. In sheep, it is found on erythrocytes but not on tissue and organs, unlike hamsters and guinea pigs whose organ cells do carry the antigen. The Forssman antigen is distinct from the Paul-Bunnell antigen, antibodies to which are diagnostic of glandular fever (infectious mononucleosis). Both antigens are present on the red blood cells of horse and sheep but guinea pig kidney cells have only the Forssman antigen. A serum positive for glandular fever therefore agglutinates horse or sheep red blood cells after absorption with guinea pig kidney.

== Namesake ==
It is named for John Frederick Forssman (1868–1947), a pioneer Swedish pathologist, who described it in 1930.
