= Memory T cell inflation =

Immune response to CMV infection

Memory T cell inflation phenomenon is the formation and maintenance of a large population of specific CD8+ T cells in reaction to cytomegalovirus (CMV) infection.

== Cytomegalovirus (CMV) ==
CMV is a worldwide type of virus which affects 60-80 % of the human population in developed countries. The virus is spread through saliva or urine and in healthy individuals can survive under the immune system control without any visible symptoms. The CMV life strategy is to integrate DNA into the genome of the host cells and escape the mechanism of natural immunity.

== Infection ==
Immune response against CMV is primarily provided by CD8 + T cells which recognize viral fragments in MHC class I complex on the surface of infected cells and destroy these cells. Specific CD8+ T cells are generated in secondary lymphoid organs where naïve T cells encounter with cytomegalovirus antigen on antigen presenting cells. This results in a population of migrating effector CD8 + T-lymphocytes and the second small population called central memory T-cells that remains in the secondary lymphatic organs and the bone marrow. These cells are capable to respond and proliferate immediately after repeated pathogen recognition. The amount of memory cells generated as a response to cytomegalovirus is approximately 9.1% - 10.2% of all circulating CD4 + and CD8 + memory cells.

== Memory CD8 + T lymphocytes characteristics ==
Generally, these cells express a low level of node localization markers - CD62L, CCR7 and occur in peripheral organs. They retain their standard functions like cytokine production and cytotoxicity. They do not express costimulatory molecules (CD28) and PD-1 receptor inhibitors on the surface, but they express the inhibitory molecules KLRG1 and CD85.

== Immunosenescence ==
Remodeling of immune response and reduced ability to protect individuals from infectious diseases is observed in relation to age. Especially in the elderly, long-term CMV infection leads to a rapid increase the number of CMV-specific T cells. The number of CMV memory CD8 + T lymphocytes then predominate and the total number of available naïve T lymphocytes decrease. CD8+T cells form up to 50 % of all peripheral blood memory cells in HCV-positive elderly individuals. The same effect on the immune system has been described in herpes viruses and parvoviruses.

== Use in therapy ==
Potential therapeutic use of memory cells is vaccination based on induction of memory T cells in the periphery that will be capable of effectively and immediately attacking the pathogen.
