= Homeobox A10 =

Protein-coding gene in humans

HOXA10

Identifiers
- Aliases: HOXA10, HOX1, HOX1.8, HOX1H, PL, Homeobox A10
- External IDs: OMIM: 142957; MGI: 96171; GeneCards: HOXA10

Gene location (Human)
Chr.	Chromosome 7 (human)
Band	7p15.2	Start	27,170,605 bp
Band	7p15.2	End	27,180,261 bp

Gene location (Mouse)
Chr.	Chromosome 6 (mouse)
Band	6 B3|6 25.4 cM	Start	52,208,177 bp
Band	6 B3|6 25.4 cM	End	52,217,834 bp
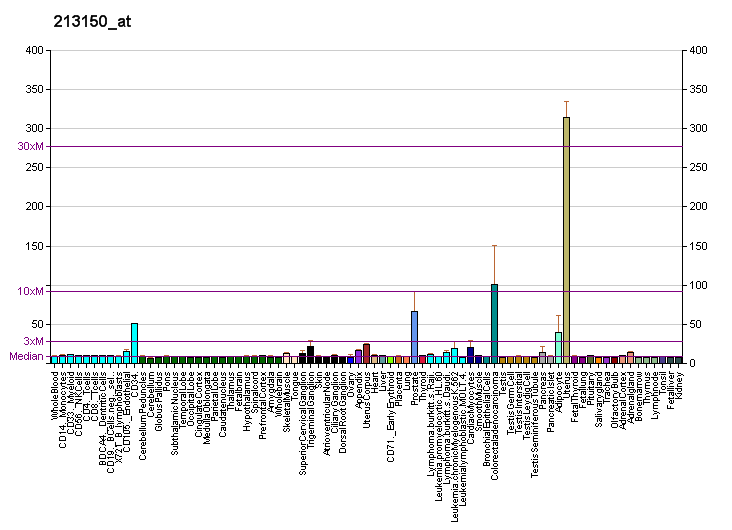

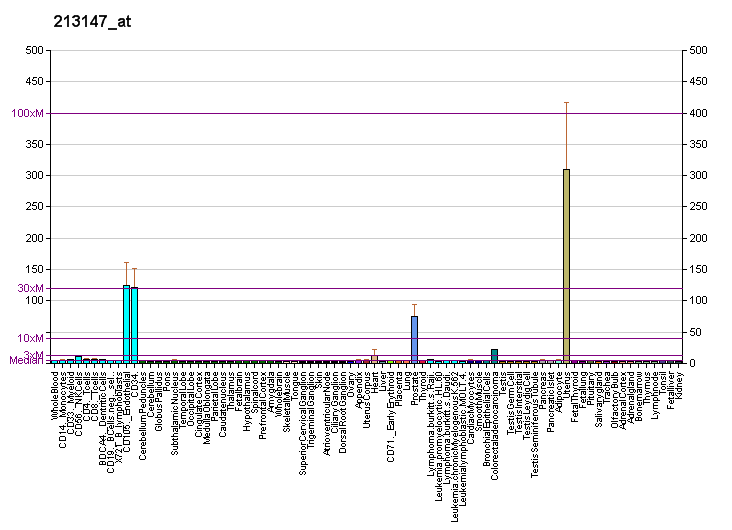
RNA expression pattern
Bgee	Human / Mouse (ortholog); Top expressed in: biceps brachii; body of uterus; Skeletal muscle tissue of biceps brachii; myometrium; endometrium; vastus lateralis muscle; canal of the cervix; muscle of leg; gastrocnemius muscle; glutes / Top expressed in: gastrula; decidua; wall of uterus; stroma of kidney; tail of embryo; connecting tubule; vas deferens; genital tubercle; Bowman's capsule; hand; More reference expression data
BioGPS	More reference expression data
Gene ontology
Molecular function	DNA binding; sequence-specific DNA binding; DNA-binding transcription activator activity, RNA polymerase II-specific; histone deacetylase binding; RNA polymerase II cis-regulatory region sequence-specific DNA binding; protein binding; DNA-binding transcription factor activity, RNA polymerase II-specific
Cellular component	cytoplasm; transcription regulator complex; nucleus
Biological process	skeletal system development; proximal/distal pattern formation; male gonad development; regulation of transcription, DNA-templated; transcription, DNA-templated; single fertilization; uterus development; multicellular organism development; embryonic limb morphogenesis; spermatogenesis; regulation of gene expression; anterior/posterior pattern specification; positive regulation of transcription by RNA polymerase II; transcription by RNA polymerase II
Sources:Amigo / QuickGO
Orthologs
Databases	NCBI: entry; OMA: entry
Species	Human	Mouse
Entrez	3206	15395
Ensembl	ENSG00000253293	ENSMUSG00000000938
UniProt	P31260	P31310
RefSeq (mRNA)	NM_018951; NM_153715	NM_001122950; NM_008263
RefSeq (protein)	NP_061824	NP_001116422; NP_032289
Location (UCSC)	Chr 7: 27.17 – 27.18 Mb	Chr 6: 52.21 – 52.22 Mb
PubMed search
- Wikidata
View/Edit Human	View/Edit Mouse

Homeobox protein Hox-A10 is a protein that in humans is encoded by the HOXA10 gene.

== Function ==
In vertebrates, the genes encoding the class of transcription factors called homeobox genes are found in clusters named A, B, C, and D on four separate chromosomes. Expression of these proteins is spatially and temporally regulated during embryonic development. This gene is part of the A cluster on chromosome 7 and encodes a DNA-binding transcription factor that may regulate gene expression, morphogenesis, and differentiation. More specifically, it may function in fertility, embryo viability, and regulation of hematopoietic lineage commitment. Alternatively spliced transcript variants encoding different isoforms have been described. Downregulation of HOXA10 is observed in the human and baboon decidua after implantation and this downregulation promotes trophoblast invasion by activating STAT3.

== Interactions ==
Homeobox A10 has been shown to interact with PTPN6.

== See also ==
- Homeobox
