= LILRA3 =

Protein-coding gene in the species Homo sapiens

Identifiers
- Aliases: LILRA3, CD85E, HM31, HM43, ILT-6, ILT6, LIR-4, LIR4, leukocyte immunoglobulin like receptor A3
- External IDs: OMIM: 604818; GeneCards: LILRA3
Available structures
PDB	Human UniProt search: PDBe RCSB
PDB	List of PDB id codes 3Q2C
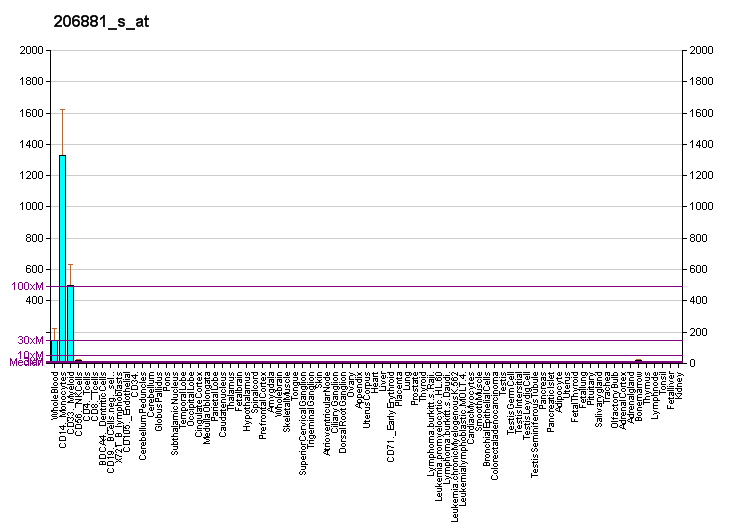
RNA expression pattern
Bgee	Human / Mouse (ortholog); n/a / n/a
BioGPS	More reference expression data
Gene ontology
Molecular function	antigen binding; signaling receptor activity
Cellular component	extracellular region; plasma membrane; specific granule membrane; tertiary granule membrane; ficolin-1-rich granule membrane
Biological process	defense response; adaptive immune response; signal transduction; immune system process; neutrophil degranulation
Sources:Amigo / QuickGO
Orthologs
Databases	NCBI: entry
Species	Human	Mouse
Entrez	11026	n/a
Ensembl	n/a	n/a
UniProt	Q8N6C8	n/a
RefSeq (mRNA)	NM_001172654; NM_006865	n/a
RefSeq (protein)	NP_001166125; NP_006856	n/a
Location (UCSC)	n/a	n/a
PubMed search		n/a
- Wikidata
View/Edit Human

Leukocyte immunoglobulin-like receptor subfamily A member 3 (LILR-A3) also known as CD85 antigen-like family member E (CD85e), immunoglobulin-like transcript 6 (ILT-6), and leukocyte immunoglobulin-like receptor 4 (LIR-4) is a protein that in humans is encoded by the LILRA3 gene located within the leukocyte receptor complex on chromosome 19q13.4. Unlike many of its family, LILRA3 lacks a transmembrane domain. The function of LILRA3 is currently unknown; however, it is highly homologous to other LILR genes, and can bind human leukocyte antigen (HLA) class I. Therefore, if secreted, the LILRA3 might impair interactions of membrane-bound LILRs (such as LILRB1, an inhibitory receptor expressed on effector and memory CD8 T cells) with their HLA ligands, thus modulating immune reactions and influencing susceptibility to disease.

Like the closely related LILRA1, LILRA3 binds to both normal and 'unfolded' free heavy chains of HLA class I, with a preference for free heavy chains of HLA-C alleles

== See also ==
- Cluster of differentiation
