= LILRB3 =

Protein-coding gene in the species Homo sapiens

Identifiers
- Aliases: LILRB3, CD85A, HL9, ILT-5, ILT5, LILRA6, LIR-3, LIR3, PIRB, PIR-B, leukocyte immunoglobulin like receptor B3
- External IDs: OMIM: 604820; MGI: 1195974; GeneCards: LILRB3

Gene location (Human)
Chr.	Chromosome 19 (human)
Band	19q13.42	Start	54,216,278 bp
Band	19q13.42	End	54,223,506 bp
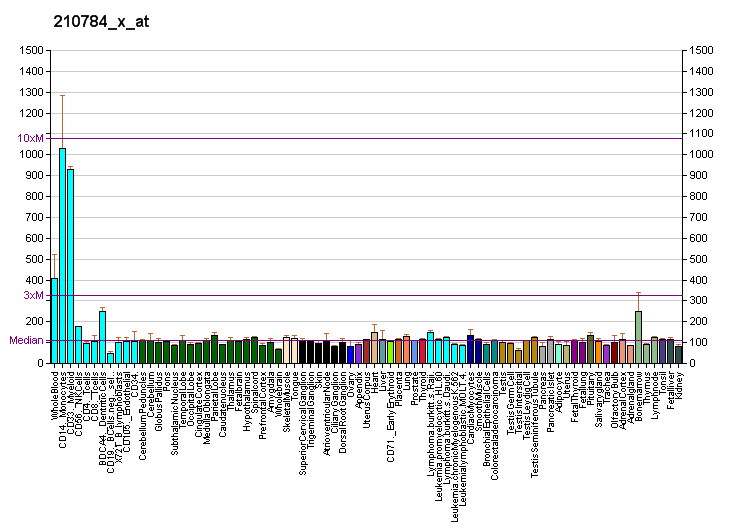

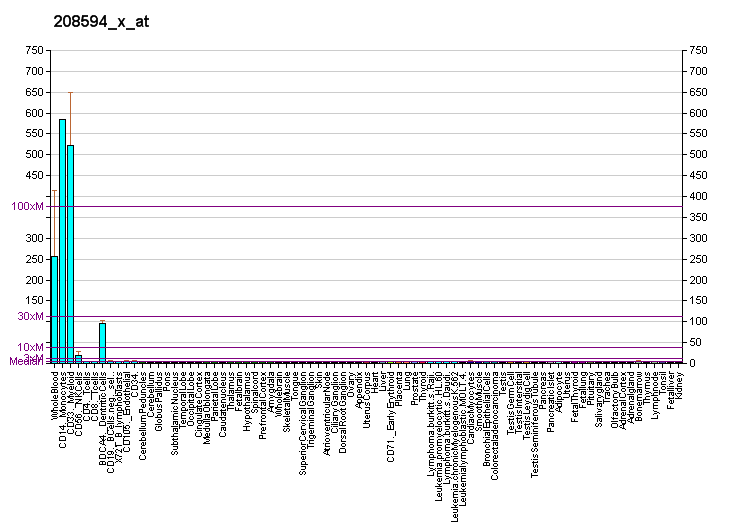

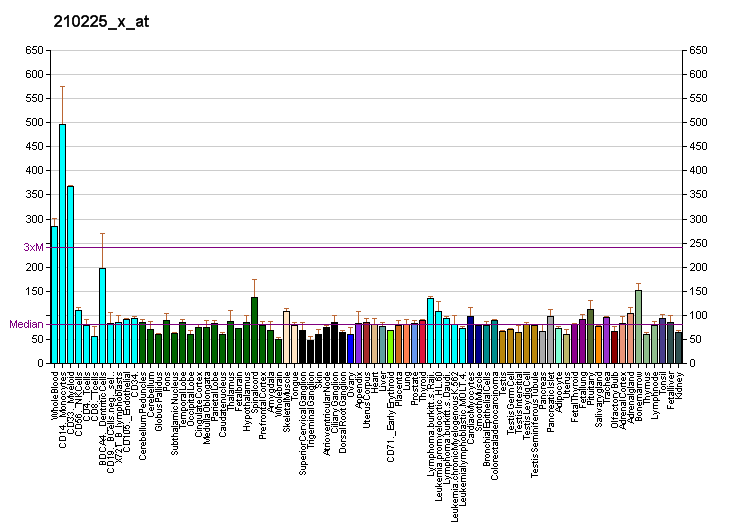
RNA expression pattern
Bgee	Human / Mouse (ortholog); Top expressed in: blood; granulocyte; monocyte; spleen; upper lobe of left lung; appendix; right lung; bone marrow; bone marrow cell; right coronary artery / n/a; More reference expression data
BioGPS	More reference expression data
Gene ontology
Molecular function	protein binding; transmembrane signaling receptor activity; amyloid-beta binding; signaling receptor activity
Cellular component	membrane; integral component of membrane; integral component of plasma membrane; plasma membrane; secretory granule membrane
Biological process	immune system process; adaptive immune response; defense response; cell surface receptor signaling pathway; negative regulation of osteoclast differentiation; neutrophil degranulation
Sources:Amigo / QuickGO
Orthologs
Databases	NCBI: entry; OMA: entry
Species	Human	Mouse
Entrez	11025	18729
Ensembl	ENSG00000275019; ENSG00000274587; ENSG00000277816; ENSG00000204577	n/a
UniProt	Q6PI73; O75022	n/a
RefSeq (mRNA)	NM_001081450; NM_006864; NM_001320960	NM_001289428; NM_008848; NM_011093
RefSeq (protein)	XP_006726238.1; XP_006726376; XP_006726377; XP_011546876; XP_011546877	n/a
Location (UCSC)	Chr 19: 54.22 – 54.22 Mb	n/a
PubMed search
- Wikidata
View/Edit Human	View/Edit Mouse

Leukocyte immunoglobulin-like receptor subfamily B member 3 is a protein that in humans is encoded by the LILRB3 gene.

This gene is a member of the leukocyte immunoglobulin-like receptor (LIR) family, which is found in a gene cluster at chromosomal region 19q13.4. The encoded protein belongs to the subfamily B class of LIR receptors which contain two or four extracellular immunoglobulin domains, a transmembrane domain, and two to four cytoplasmic immunoreceptor tyrosine-based inhibitory motifs (ITIMs). The receptor is expressed on immune cells and is believed to be a myeloid checkpoint. It is thought to control inflammatory responses and cytotoxicity to help focus the immune response and limit autoreactivity. Multiple transcript variants encoding different isoforms have been found for this gene.

== See also ==
- Cluster of differentiation
