= LILRB5 =

Protein-coding gene in the species Homo sapiens

Identifiers
- Aliases: LILRB5, CD85C, LIR-8, LIR8, leukocyte immunoglobulin like receptor B5
- External IDs: OMIM: 604814; GeneCards: LILRB5

Gene location (Human)
| Chr. | Chromosome 19 (human) |
| Band | 19q13.42 | Start | 54,249,421 bp |
| Band | 19q13.42 | End | 54,257,301 bp |
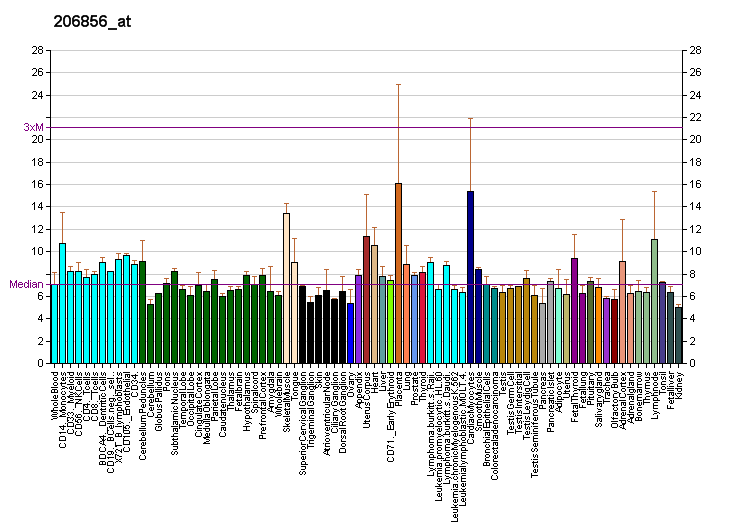
RNA expression pattern
| Bgee | Human / Mouse (ortholog); Top expressed in: spleen; thymus; subcutaneous adipose tissue; right adrenal cortex; left adrenal gland; left adrenal cortex; placenta; duodenum; right coronary artery; gastric mucosa / n/a; More reference expression data |
| BioGPS | More reference expression data |
Gene ontology
| Molecular function | transmembrane signaling receptor activity |
| Cellular component | integral component of membrane; membrane |
| Biological process | defense response; cell surface receptor signaling pathway; adaptive immune response; immune system process |
Sources:Amigo / QuickGO
Orthologs
| Databases | NCBI: entry; OMA: entry |
| Species | Human | Mouse |
| Entrez | 10990 | n/a |
| Ensembl | ENSG00000274311; ENSG00000278437; ENSG00000273991; ENSG00000277414; ENSG00000105609 n/a | n/a |
| UniProt | O75023 | n/a |
| RefSeq (mRNA) | NM_001081442; NM_001081443; NM_001304457; NM_006840 | n/a |
| RefSeq (protein) | NP_001074911; NP_001074912; NP_001291386; NP_006831 | n/a |
| Location (UCSC) | Chr 19: 54.25 – 54.26 Mb | n/a |
| PubMed search | | n/a |
- Wikidata
| View/Edit Human |

Leukocyte immunoglobulin-like receptor subfamily B member 5 is a protein that in humans is encoded by the LILRB5 gene.

This gene is a member of the leukocyte immunoglobulin-like receptor (LIR) family, which is found in a gene cluster at chromosomal region 19q13.4. The encoded protein belongs to the subfamily B class of LIR receptors which contain two or four extracellular immunoglobulin domains, a transmembrane domain, and two to four cytoplasmic immunoreceptor tyrosine-based inhibitory motifs (ITIMs). Several other LIR subfamily B receptors are expressed on immune cells where they bind to MHC class I molecules on antigen-presenting cells and inhibit stimulation of an immune response. Multiple transcript variants encoding different isoforms have been found for this gene.
