= Heterophile antibody test =

Diagnostic test for infectious mononucleosis

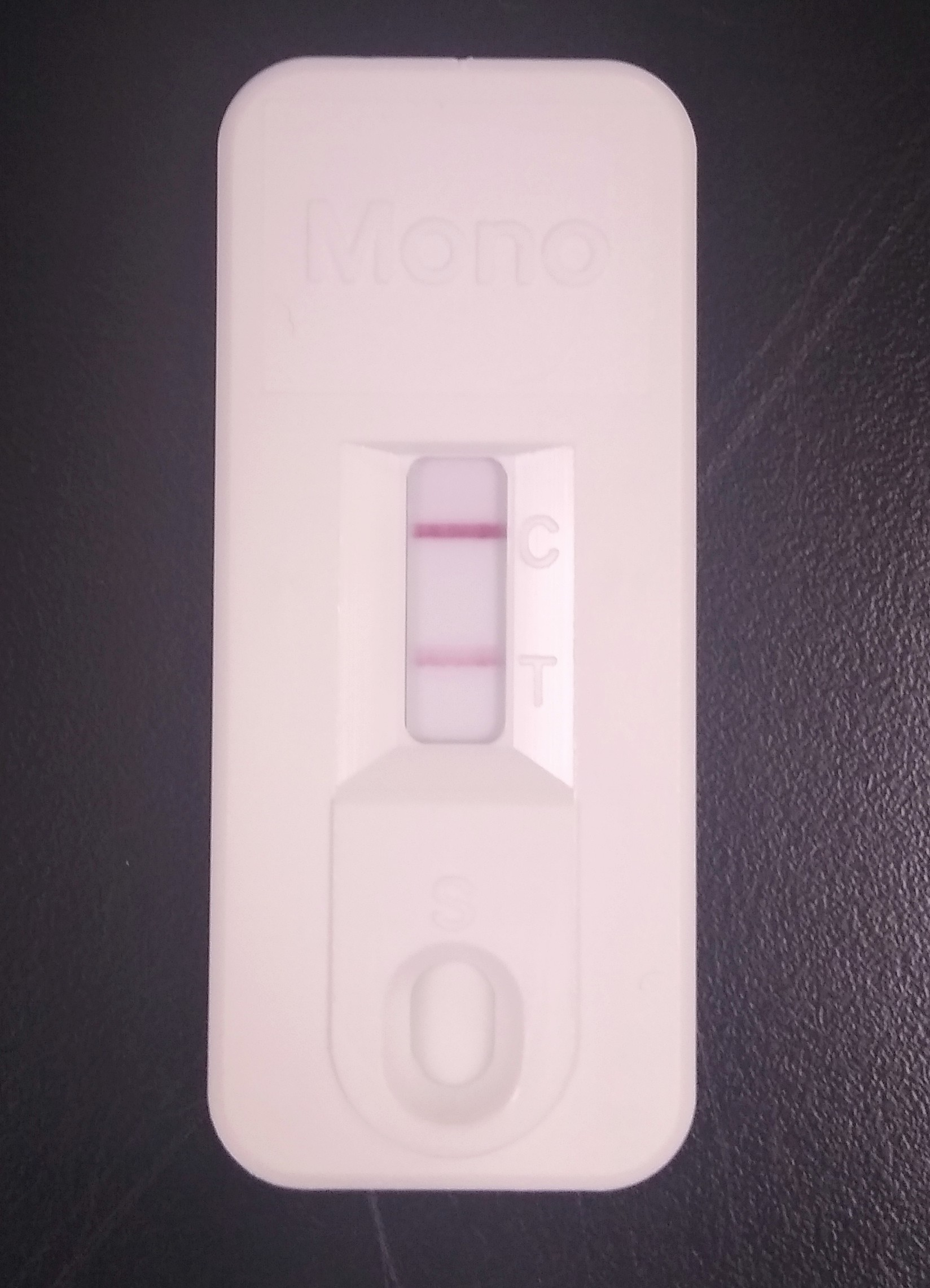
- A commercial immunochromatographic test kit for the heterophile antibody test. Solid lines are visible at the "C" (control) and "T" (test) positions, indicating a positive result.
- Synonyms: Monospot test
- Purpose: rapid test for infectious mononucleosis

The mononuclear spot test or monospot test, a form of the heterophile antibody test, is a rapid test for infectious mononucleosis due to Epstein–Barr virus (EBV). It is an improvement on the Paul–Bunnell test. The test is specific for heterophile antibodies produced by the human immune system in response to EBV infection. Commercially available test kits are 70–92% sensitive and 96–100% specific, with a lower sensitivity in the first two weeks after clinical symptoms begin.

The United States Center for Disease Control deems the monospot test not to be very useful.

== Medical uses ==
It is indicated as a confirmatory test when a physician suspects EBV, typically in the presence of clinical features such as fever, malaise, pharyngitis, tender lymphadenopathy (especially posterior cervical; often called "tender glands") and splenomegaly.

In the case of delayed or absent seroconversion, an immunofluorescence test could be used if the diagnosis is in doubt. It has the following characteristics: VCAs (Viral Capsid Antigen) of the IgM class, antibodies to EBV early antigen (anti-EA), absent antibodies to EBV nuclear antigen (anti-EBNA)

=== Usefulness ===
One source states that the specificity of the test is high, virtually 100%, Another source states that a number of other conditions can cause false positives. Rarely, however, a false positive heterophile antibody test may result from systemic lupus erythematosus, toxoplasmosis, rubella, lymphoma and leukemia.

However, the sensitivity is only moderate, so a negative test does not exclude EBV. This lack of sensitivity is especially the case in young children, many of whom will not produce detectable amounts of the heterophile antibody and will thus have a false negative test result.

=== Timing ===
It will generally not be positive during the 4–6 week incubation period before the onset of symptoms. The highest amount of heterophile antibodies occurs 2 to 5 weeks after the onset of symptoms. If positive, it will remain so for at least six weeks. An elevated heterophile antibody level may persist up to 1 year.

== Process ==
The test is usually performed using commercially available test kits which detect the reaction of heterophile antibodies in a person's blood sample with horse or cow red blood cell antigens. These test kits work on the principles of latex agglutination or immunochromatography. Using this method, the test can be performed by individuals without specialized training, and the results may be available in as little as five minutes.

Manual versions of the test rely on the agglutination of horse erythrocytes by heterophile antibodies in patient serum. Heterophile means it reacts with proteins across species lines. Heterophile also can mean that it is an antibody that reacts with antigens other than the antigen that stimulated it (an antibody that crossreacts). A 20% suspension of horse red cells is used in an isotonic 3–8% sodium citrate formulation. One drop of the patient's serum to be tested is mixed on an opal glass slide with one drop of a particulate suspension of guinea-pig kidney stroma, and a suspension of ox red cell stroma; sera and suspensions are mixed with a wooden applicator 10 times. Ten microliters of the horse red cell suspension are then added and mixed with each drop of adsorbed serum. The mixture is left undisturbed for one minute (not rocked or shaken). It is then examined for the presence or absence of red cell agglutination. If stronger with the sera adsorbed with guinea-pig kidney, the test is positive. If stronger with the sera adsorbed with ox red cell stroma, the test is negative. If agglutination is absent in both mixtures, the test is negative. A known 'positive' and 'negative' control serum is tested with each batch of test sera.
