= LILRB4 =

Protein-coding gene in the species Homo sapiens

Identifiers
- Aliases: LILRB4, CD85K, ILT-3, ILT3, LIR-5, LIR5, leukocyte immunoglobulin like receptor B4, B4
- External IDs: OMIM: 604821; MGI: 102702; GeneCards: LILRB4
Available structures
PDB	Ortholog search: PDBe RCSB
PDB	List of PDB id codes 3P2T

Gene location (Human)
Chr.	Chromosome 19 (human)
Band	19q13.42	Start	54,643,889 bp
Band	19q13.42	End	54,670,359 bp

Gene location (Mouse)
Chr.	Chromosome 10 (mouse)
Band	10|10 B3	Start	51,356,728 bp
Band	10|10 B3	End	51,362,799 bp
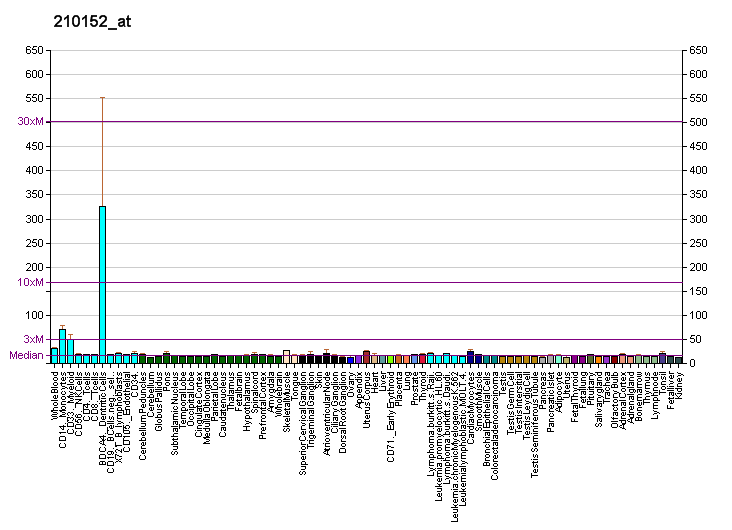
RNA expression pattern
Bgee	Human / Mouse (ortholog); Top expressed in: appendix; monocyte; granulocyte; lymph node; blood; spleen; C1 segment; gallbladder; placenta; bone marrow / Top expressed in: granulocyte; bone marrow; zone of skin; ovary; white adipose tissue; liver; uterus; lung; spleen; lip; More reference expression data
BioGPS	More reference expression data
Gene ontology
Molecular function	antigen binding; protein binding; signaling receptor activity
Cellular component	extracellular exosome; plasma membrane; membrane; integral component of membrane
Biological process	negative regulation of pri-miRNA transcription by RNA polymerase II; immune system process; adaptive immune response; signal transduction; negative regulation of osteoclast differentiation; positive regulation of regulatory T cell differentiation; negative regulation of T cell receptor signaling pathway; negative regulation of protein localization to nucleus
Sources:Amigo / QuickGO
Orthologs
Databases	NCBI: entry; OMA: entry
Species	Human	Mouse
Entrez	11006	14727
Ensembl	ENSG00000275730; ENSG00000186818; ENSG00000276042; ENSG00000278279; ENSG00000278555 n/a	ENSMUSG00000112023
UniProt	Q8NHJ6	Q61450
RefSeq (mRNA)	NM_001081438; NM_001278426; NM_001278427; NM_001278428; NM_001278429 NM_001278430; NM_006847; NM_001394933; NM_001394934; NM_001394935; NM_001394936; NM_001394937; NM_001394938; NM_001394939	NM_001291892; NM_001291893; NM_008147
RefSeq (protein)	NP_001265355; NP_001265356; NP_001265357; NP_001265358; NP_001265359	NP_001278821; NP_001278822; NP_032173
Location (UCSC)	Chr 19: 54.64 – 54.67 Mb	Chr 10: 51.36 – 51.36 Mb
PubMed search
- Wikidata
View/Edit Human	View/Edit Mouse

Leukocyte immunoglobulin-like receptor subfamily B member 4 is a protein that in humans is encoded by the LILRB4 gene.

This gene is a member of the leukocyte immunoglobulin-like receptor (LIR) family, which is found in a gene cluster at chromosomal region 19q13.4. The encoded protein belongs to the subfamily B class of LIR receptors which contain two or four extracellular immunoglobulin domains, a transmembrane domain, and two to four cytoplasmic immunoreceptor tyrosine-based inhibitory motifs (ITIMs). The receptor is expressed on monocytic cells and transduces a negative signal that inhibits stimulation of an immune response. The receptor can also function in antigen capture and presentation. It is thought to control inflammatory responses and cytotoxicity to help focus the immune response and limit autoreactivity. LILRB4 has also been proposed to be a potential target for tumor immunotherapy. It has been shown to express on tumor-associated macrophages and negatively regulate immune response in tumor. The expression of LILRB4 on monocytic myeloid leukemia cells supports infiltration and inhibits T cell proliferation. Multiple transcript variants encoding different isoforms have been found for this gene.

== Interactions ==
LILRB4 has been shown to interact with PTPN6 and INPP5D (SHIP-1).

== See also ==
- Cluster of differentiation
- Immunoglobulin superfamily
