= Infectious mononucleosis =

Common viral infectious disease

- Other names: Glandular fever, kissing disease, Pfeiffer's disease and Filatov's disease (ill-defined historical syndromes)
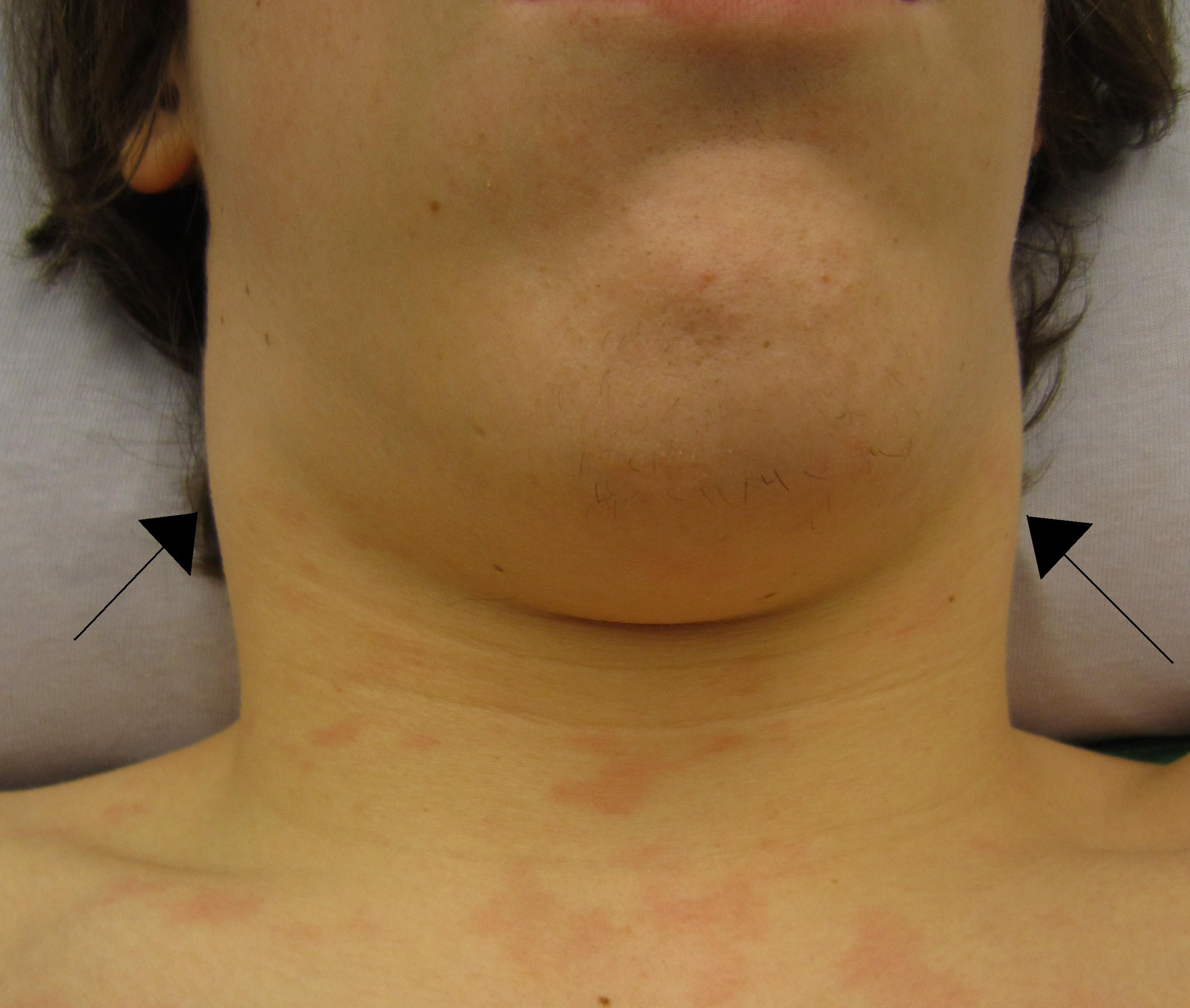
- Swollen lymph nodes in the neck of a person with infectious mononucleosis
- Specialty: Infectious disease
- Symptoms: Fever, sore throat, lymphadenopathy, fatigue
- Complications: Swelling of the liver or spleen
- Duration: 2–4 weeks
- Causes: Epstein–Barr virus (EBV) usually spread via saliva
- Diagnostic method: Based on symptoms and blood tests
- Treatment: Drinking enough fluids, getting sufficient rest, pain medications such as paracetamol (acetaminophen) and ibuprofen
- Frequency: 45 per 100,000 per year (U.S.)

Infectious mononucleosis (IM, mono), also known as glandular fever, is an infection usually caused by the Epstein–Barr virus (EBV). Most people are infected by the virus as children, when the disease produces few or no symptoms. In young adults, the disease often results in fever, sore throat, enlarged lymph nodes in the neck, and fatigue. Most people recover in two to four weeks, although fatigue may last months. The liver or spleen may also become swollen and, in less than one percent of cases, splenic rupture may occur.

While usually caused by the Epstein–Barr virus, also known as human herpesvirus 4, which is a member of the herpesvirus family, a few other viruses and the protozoon Toxoplasma gondii may also cause the disease. It is primarily spread through saliva but can rarely be spread through semen or blood. Spread may occur by objects such as drinking glasses or toothbrushes, or through a cough or sneeze. Those who are infected can spread the disease weeks before symptoms develop. Mono is primarily diagnosed based on the symptoms and can be confirmed with blood tests for specific antibodies. Another typical finding is increased blood lymphocytes of which more than 10% are reactive. The monospot test is not recommended for general use due to poor accuracy.

There is no vaccine for EBV; however, there is ongoing research. Infection can be prevented by not sharing personal items or saliva with an infected person. Mono generally improves without any specific treatment. Symptoms may be reduced by drinking enough fluids, getting sufficient rest, and taking pain medications such as paracetamol (acetaminophen) and ibuprofen.

Mononucleosis most commonly affects those between the ages of 15 and 24 years in the developed world. In the developing world, people are more often infected in early childhood when there are fewer symptoms. In those between 16 and 20 it is the cause of about 8% of sore throats. About 45 out of 100,000 people develop infectious mono each year in the United States. Nearly 95% of people have had an EBV infection by the time they are adults. The disease occurs equally at all times of the year. Mononucleosis was first described in the 1920s and is colloquially known as "the kissing disease".

== Signs and symptoms ==
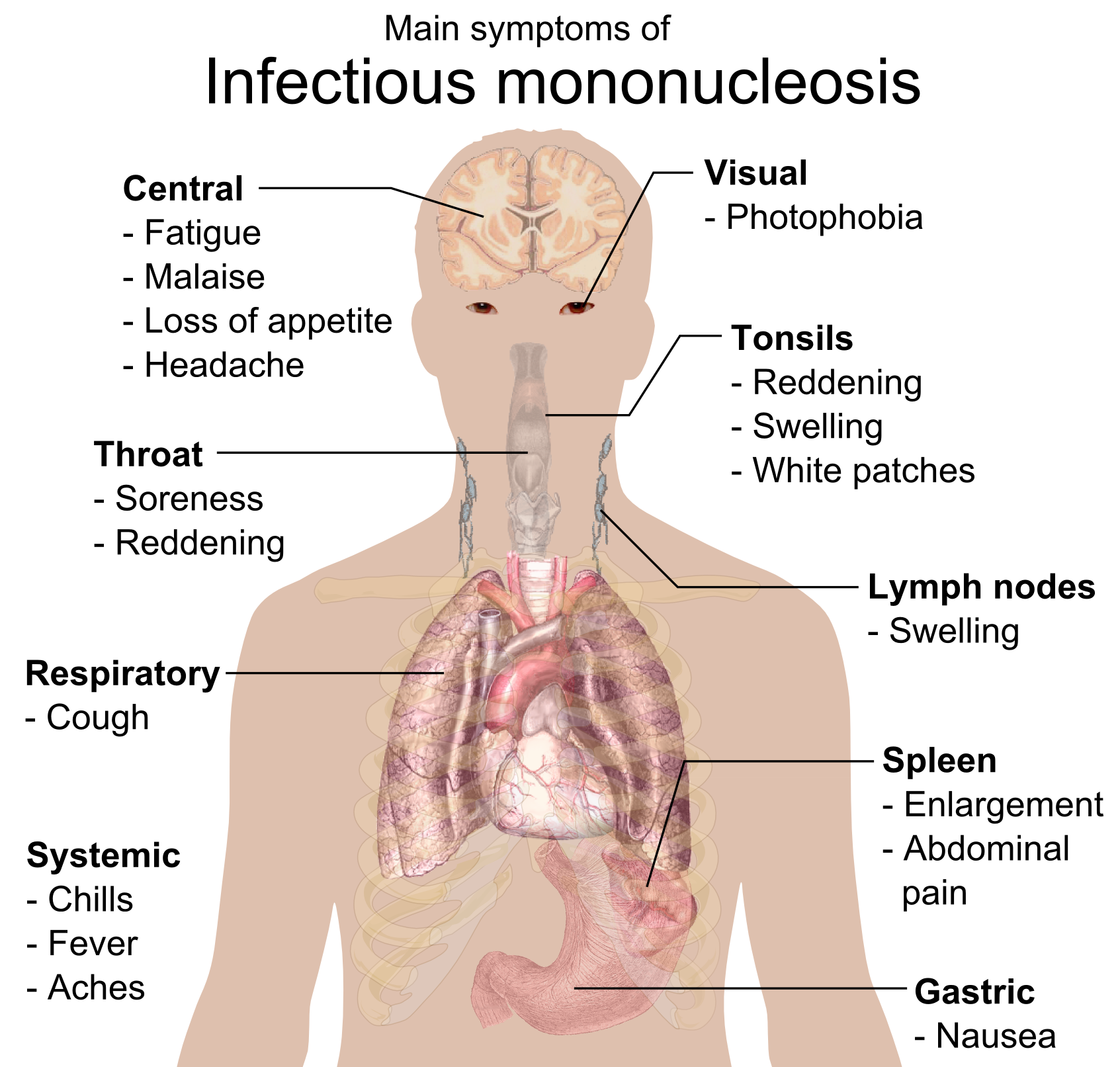
Main symptoms of infectious mononucleosis

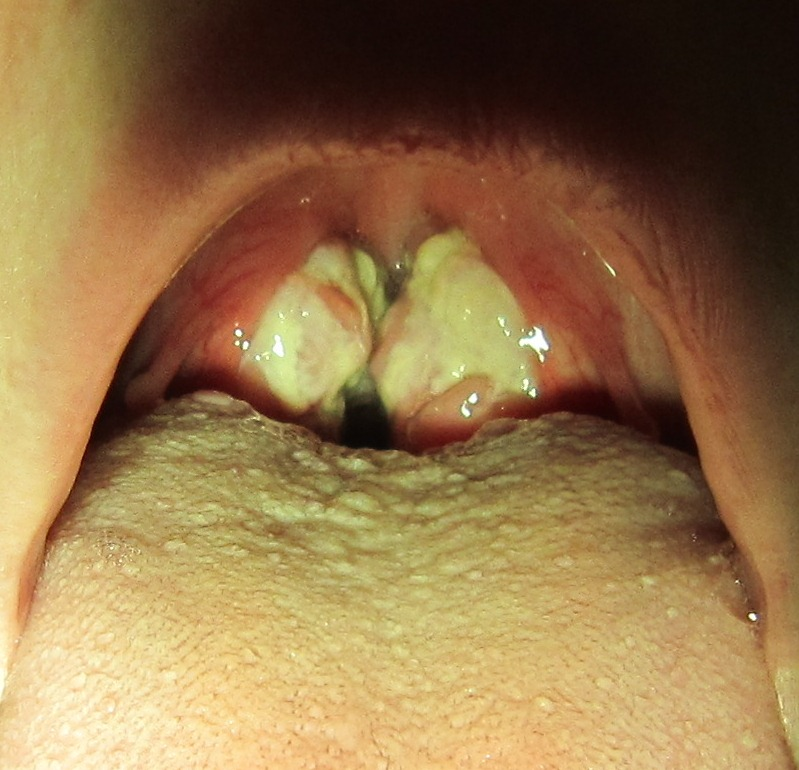
Exudative pharyngitis in a person with infectious mononucleosis

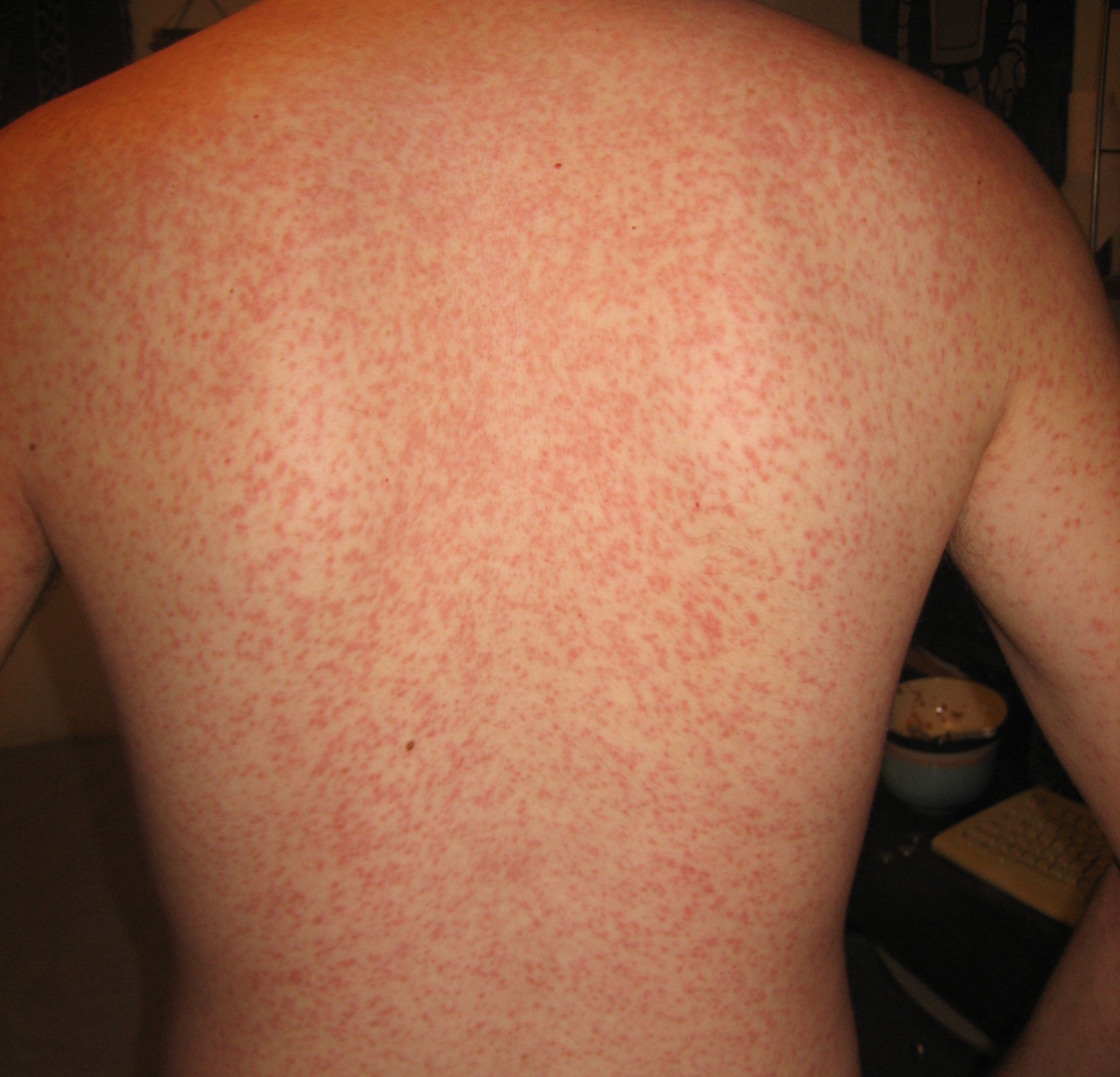
Rash from using penicillin while infected with IM

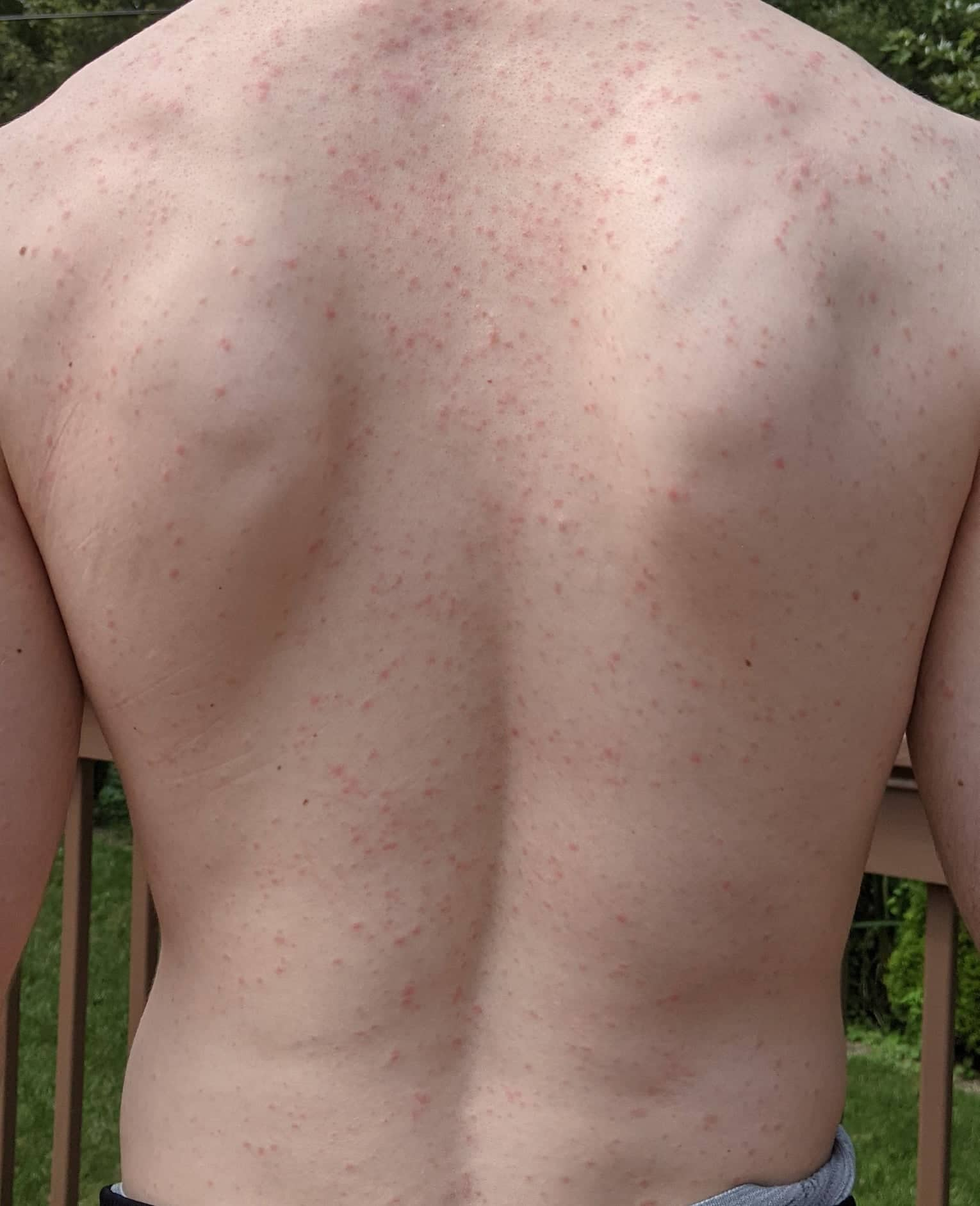
Maculopapular rash from amoxicillin use during EBV infection

The signs and symptoms of infectious mononucleosis vary with age.

=== Children ===
Before puberty, the disease typically only produces flu-like symptoms, if any at all. When found, symptoms tend to be similar to those of common throat infections (mild pharyngitis, with or without tonsillitis).

=== Adolescents and young adults ===
In adolescence and young adulthood, the disease presents with a characteristic triad:

- Fever – usually lasting 14 days; often mild.
- Sore throat – usually severe for 3–5 days, before resolving in the next 7–10 days.
- Swollen glands – mobile; usually located around the back of the neck (posterior cervical lymph nodes) and sometimes throughout the body.

Another major symptom is feeling tired. Headaches are common, and abdominal pains with nausea or vomiting sometimes also occur. Symptoms most often disappear after about 2–4 weeks. However, fatigue and a general feeling of being unwell (malaise) may sometimes last for months. Fatigue lasts more than one month in an estimated 28% of cases. Mild fever, swollen neck glands and body aches may also persist beyond 4 weeks. Most people can resume their usual activities within 2–3 months.

The most prominent sign of the disease is often pharyngitis, which is frequently accompanied by enlarged tonsils with pus—an exudate similar to that seen in cases of strep throat. In about 50% of cases, small reddish-purple spots called petechiae can be seen on the roof of the mouth. Palatal enanthem can also occur, but is relatively uncommon.

A small minority of people spontaneously present a rash, usually on the arms or trunk, which can be macular (morbilliform) or papular. Almost all people given amoxicillin or ampicillin eventually develop a generalized, itchy maculopapular rash, which however does not imply that the person will have adverse reactions to penicillins again in the future. Occasional cases of erythema nodosum and erythema multiforme have been reported. Seizures may also occasionally occur.

=== Complications ===
Spleen enlargement is common in the second and third weeks, although this may not be apparent on physical examination. Rarely, the spleen may rupture. There may also be some enlargement of the liver. Jaundice or EBV-induced hepatitis occurs only occasionally.

It generally gets better on its own in people who are otherwise healthy. When caused by EBV, infectious mononucleosis is classified as one of the Epstein–Barr virus–associated lymphoproliferative diseases. Occasionally, the disease may persist and result in a chronic infection. This may develop into systemic EBV-positive T cell lymphoma.

=== Older adults ===
Infectious mononucleosis mainly affects younger adults. When older adults do catch the disease, they less often have characteristic signs and symptoms such as the sore throat and lymphadenopathy. Instead, they may primarily experience prolonged fever, fatigue, malaise, and body pains. They are more likely to have liver enlargement and jaundice. People over 40 years of age are more likely to develop serious illness.

=== Incubation period ===
The exact length of time between infection and symptoms is unclear. A review of the literature made an estimate of 33–49 days. In adolescents and young adults, symptoms are thought to appear around 4–6 weeks after initial infection. Onset is often gradual, though it can be abrupt. The main symptoms may be preceded by 1–2 weeks of fatigue, feeling unwell and body aches.

== Cause ==
=== Epstein–Barr virus ===
About 90% of cases of infectious mononucleosis are caused by the Epstein–Barr virus, a member of the Herpesviridae family of DNA viruses. It is one of the most commonly found viruses throughout the world. Contrary to common belief, the Epstein–Barr virus is not highly contagious. It can only be contracted through direct contact with an infected person's saliva, such as through kissing or sharing toothbrushes. About 95% of the population has been exposed to this virus by the age of 40, but only 15–20% of teenagers and about 40% of exposed adults develop infectious mononucleosis.

=== Cytomegalovirus ===
About 5–7% of cases of infectious mononucleosis are caused by human cytomegalovirus (CMV), another type of herpes virus. This virus is found in body fluids including saliva, urine, blood, tears, breast milk and genital secretions. A person becomes infected with this virus by direct contact with infected body fluids. Cytomegalovirus is most commonly transmitted through kissing and sexual intercourse. It can also be transferred from an infected mother to her unborn child. This virus is often "silent" because the signs and symptoms cannot be felt by the person infected. However, it can cause life-threatening illness in infants, people with HIV, transplant recipients, and those with weak immune systems. For those with weak immune systems, cytomegalovirus can cause more serious illnesses such as pneumonia and inflammations of the retina, esophagus, liver, large intestine, and brain. Approximately 90% of the human population has been infected with cytomegalovirus by the time they reach adulthood. Most are unaware of the infection. Once a person becomes infected with cytomegalovirus, the virus stays in their body throughout the person's lifetime. During this latent phase, the virus can be detected only in monocytes.

=== Other causes ===
Toxoplasma gondii, a parasitic protozoon, is responsible for less than 1% of the infectious mononucleosis cases. Viral hepatitis, adenovirus, rubella, and herpes simplex viruses have also been reported as rare causes of infectious mononucleosis.

=== Transmission ===
Epstein–Barr virus infection is spread via saliva, and has an incubation period of four to seven weeks. The length of time that an individual remains contagious is unclear. The chances of passing the illness to someone else may be highest during the first six weeks following infection. Some studies indicate that a person can spread the infection for many months.

== Pathophysiology ==
The virus replicates first within epithelial cells in the pharynx (which causes pharyngitis, or sore throat), and later primarily within B cells (which are invaded via their CD21). The host immune response involves cytotoxic (CD8-positive) T cells against infected B lymphocytes, resulting in enlarged, reactive lymphocytes (Downey cells).When the infection is acute (recent onset, instead of chronic), heterophile antibodies are produced. The subsequent expansion of the T-cells leads to memory T cell inflation, with the formation and maintenance of a large population of specific CD8+ T cells.

Cytomegalovirus, adenovirus, and Toxoplasma gondii (toxoplasmosis) infections can cause symptoms similar to infectious mononucleosis, but a heterophile antibody test will test negative and differentiate those infections from infectious mononucleosis.

Mononucleosis is sometimes accompanied by secondary cold agglutinin disease, an autoimmune disease in which abnormal circulating antibodies directed against red blood cells can lead to a form of autoimmune hemolytic anemia. The cold agglutinin detected is of anti-i specificity.

== Diagnosis ==
Infectious mononucleosis, peripheral smear, high power showing reactive lymphocytes

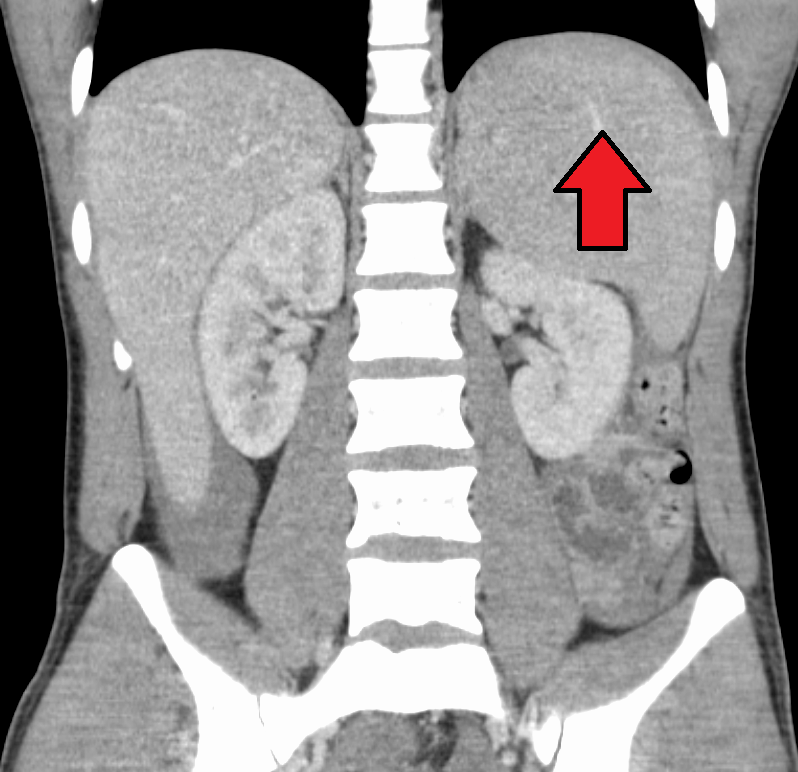
Splenomegaly due to mononucleosis resulting in a subcapsular hematoma

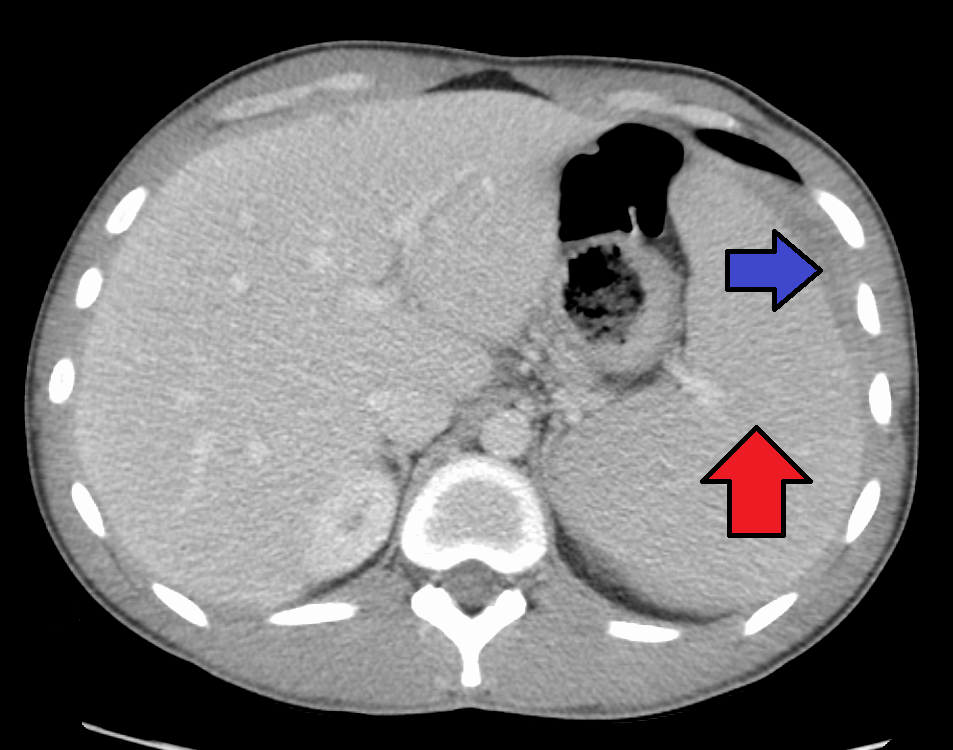
Splenomegaly due to mononucleosis resulting in a subcapsular hematoma

The disease is diagnosed based on:

=== Physical examination ===
The presence of an enlarged spleen, and swollen posterior cervical, axillary, and inguinal lymph nodes are the most useful to suspect a diagnosis of infectious mononucleosis. On the other hand, the absence of swollen cervical lymph nodes and fatigue is the most useful to dismiss the idea of infectious mononucleosis as the correct diagnosis. The insensitivity of the physical examination in detecting an enlarged spleen means it should not be used as evidence against infectious mononucleosis. A physical examination may also show petechiae in the palate.

=== Heterophile antibody test ===
The heterophile antibody test, also known as the monospot test, works by agglutination of red blood cells from guinea pigs, sheep and horses. This test is specific but not particularly sensitive (with a false-negative rate of as high as 25% in the first week, 5–10% in the second, and 5% in the third). Approximately 90% of diagnosed people have heterophile antibodies by week 3, disappearing in under a year. The antibodies involved in the test do not interact with the Epstein–Barr virus or any of its antigens.

The monospot test is not recommended for general use by the CDC due to its poor accuracy.

=== Serology ===
Serologic tests detect antibodies directed against the Epstein–Barr virus. Immunoglobulin G (IgG), when positive, mainly reflects a past infection, whereas immunoglobulin M (IgM) mainly reflects a current infection. EBV-targeting antibodies can also be classified according to which part of the virus they bind to:

- Viral capsid antigen (VCA):
  - Anti-VCA IgM antibodies appear early after infection, and usually disappear within 4 to 6 weeks.
  - Anti-VCA IgG antibodies appear in the acute phase of EBV infection, reach a maximum at 2 to 4 weeks after onset of symptoms, and thereafter decline slightly and persist for the rest of a person's life.
- Early antigen (EA)
  - Anti-EA IgG appears in the acute phase of illness and disappears after 3 to 6 months. It is associated with having an active infection. Yet, 20% of people may have antibodies against EA for years despite no other sign of infection.
- EBV nuclear antigen (EBNA)
  - Antibody to EBNA slowly appears 2 to 4 months after the onset of symptoms and persists for the rest of a person's life.

When negative, these tests are more accurate than the heterophile antibody test in ruling out infectious mononucleosis. When positive, they feature similar specificity to the heterophile antibody test. Therefore, these tests are useful for diagnosing infectious mononucleosis in people with highly suggestive symptoms and a negative heterophile antibody test.

=== Other tests ===
- Elevated hepatic transaminase levels are highly suggestive of infectious mononucleosis, occurring in up to 50% of people.
- By blood film, one diagnostic criterion for infectious mononucleosis is the presence of 50% lymphocytes with at least 10% reactive lymphocytes (large, irregular nuclei), while the person also has fever, pharyngitis, and swollen lymph nodes. The reactive lymphocytes resembled monocytes when they were first discovered, thus the term "mononucleosis" was coined.
- A fibrin ring granuloma may be present in the liver or bone marrow.

=== Differential diagnosis ===
About 10% of people who present a clinical picture of infectious mononucleosis do not have an acute Epstein–Barr-virus infection. A differential diagnosis of acute infectious mononucleosis needs to take into consideration acute cytomegalovirus infection and Toxoplasma gondii infections. Because their management is similar, it is not always helpful or possible to distinguish between Epstein–Barr virus mononucleosis and cytomegalovirus infection. However, in pregnant women, differentiation of mononucleosis from toxoplasmosis is important, since it is associated with significant consequences for the fetus.

Acute HIV infection can mimic signs similar to those of infectious mononucleosis, and tests should be performed for pregnant women for the same reason as toxoplasmosis.

People with infectious mononucleosis are sometimes misdiagnosed with a streptococcal pharyngitis (because of the symptoms of fever, pharyngitis and adenopathy) and are given antibiotics such as ampicillin or amoxicillin as treatment.

Other conditions from which to distinguish infectious mononucleosis include leukemia, tonsillitis, diphtheria, common cold and influenza (flu).

== Treatment ==
Infectious mononucleosis is generally self-limiting, so only symptomatic or supportive treatments are used. The need for rest and return to usual activities after the acute phase of the infection may reasonably be based on the person's general energy levels. Nevertheless, in an effort to decrease the risk of splenic rupture, experts advise avoidance of contact sports and other heavy physical activity, especially when involving increased abdominal pressure or the Valsalva maneuver (as in rowing or weight training), for at least the first 3–4 weeks of illness or until enlargement of the spleen has resolved, as determined by a treating physician.

=== Medications ===
Paracetamol (acetaminophen) and NSAIDs, such as ibuprofen, may be used to reduce fever and pain. Prednisone, a corticosteroid, while used to try to reduce throat pain or enlarged tonsils, remains controversial due to the lack of evidence that it is effective and the potential for side effects. Aspirin should not be given to under-16s due to the risk of Reye syndrome. Intravenous corticosteroids, usually hydrocortisone or dexamethasone, are not recommended for routine use but may be useful if there is a risk of airway obstruction, a very low platelet count, or hemolytic anemia.

Antiviral agents act by inhibiting viral DNA replication. There is little evidence to support the use of antivirals such as aciclovir and valacyclovir, although they may reduce initial viral shedding. Antivirals are expensive, risk causing resistance to antiviral agents, and (in 1% to 10% of cases) can cause unpleasant side effects. Although antivirals are not recommended for people with simple infectious mononucleosis, they may be useful (in conjunction with steroids) in the management of severe EBV manifestations, such as EBV meningitis, peripheral neuritis, hepatitis, or hematologic complications.

Although antibiotics exert no antiviral action they may be indicated to treat bacterial secondary infections of the throat, such as with streptococcus (strep throat). However, ampicillin and amoxicillin are not recommended during acute Epstein–Barr virus infection as a diffuse rash may develop.

=== Observation ===
Splenomegaly is a common symptom of infectious mononucleosis, and healthcare providers may consider using abdominal ultrasonography to get insight into the enlargement of a person's spleen. However, because spleen size varies greatly, ultrasonography is not a valid technique for assessing spleen enlargement. It should not be used in typical circumstances or to make routine decisions about fitness for playing sports.

== Prognosis ==
Serious complications are uncommon, occurring in less than 5% of cases:

- CNS complications include meningitis, encephalitis, hemiplegia, Guillain–Barré syndrome, and transverse myelitis. Prior infectious mononucleosis has been linked to the development of multiple sclerosis.
- Hematologic: Hemolytic anemia (direct Coombs test is positive) and various cytopenias, and bleeding (caused by thrombocytopenia) can occur.
- Mild jaundice
- Hepatitis with the Epstein–Barr virus is rare.
- Upper airway obstruction from tonsillar hypertrophy is rare.
- Fulminant disease course of immunocompromised people are rare.
- Splenic rupture is rare.
- Myocarditis and pericarditis are rare.
- Postural orthostatic tachycardia syndrome
- Myalgic encephalomyelitis/chronic fatigue syndrome
- Cancers associated with the Epstein–Barr virus include Burkitt's lymphoma, Hodgkin's lymphoma and lymphomas in general as well as nasopharyngeal and gastric carcinoma.
- Hemophagocytic lymphohistiocytosis

Once the acute symptoms of an initial infection resolve, they often do not return. But once infected, the person carries the virus for the rest of their life. The virus typically lives dormant in B lymphocytes. Independent infections of mononucleosis may be contracted multiple times, regardless of whether the person is already carrying the virus dormant. Periodically, the virus can reactivate, during which time the person is again infectious, but usually without any symptoms of illness. Usually, a person with IM has few, if any, further symptoms or problems from the latent B lymphocyte infection. However, in susceptible hosts under the appropriate environmental stressors, the virus can reactivate and cause vague physical symptoms (or may be subclinical). During this phase, the virus can spread to others.

== History ==
The characteristic symptomatology of infectious mononucleosis does not appear to have been reported until the late nineteenth century. In 1885, the renowned Russian pediatrician Nil Filatov reported an infectious process he called "idiopathic adenitis" exhibiting symptoms that correspond to infectious mononucleosis, and in 1889 a German balneologist and pediatrician, Emil Pfeiffer, independently reported similar cases (some of lesser severity) that tended to cluster in families, for which he coined the term Drüsenfieber ("glandular fever").

The word mononucleosis has several senses, but today it usually is used in the sense of infectious mononucleosis, which is caused by EBV.

The term "infectious mononucleosis" was coined in 1920 by Thomas Peck Sprunt and Frank Alexander Evans in a classic clinical description of the disease published in the Bulletin of the Johns Hopkins Hospital, entitled "Mononuclear leukocytosis in reaction to acute infection (infectious mononucleosis)". A lab test for infectious mononucleosis was developed in 1931 by Yale School of Public Health Professor John Rodman Paul and Walls Willard Bunnell based on their discovery of heterophile antibodies in the sera of persons with the disease. The Paul-Bunnell Test or PBT was later replaced by the heterophile antibody test.

Before the identification of infectious mononucleosis as a distinct disease, it was most often called "glandular fever", and there were few tests to determine an infection. Notable confirmed outbreaks of mononucleosis in the late 19th and early 20th centuries include a large outbreak in an Ohio community in 1896, an outbreak in which 87 people were infected in a community in the Falkland Islands, and an outbreak at Naval Air Station North Island in Coronado, California, where 220 individuals were infected by the virus.

The Epstein–Barr virus was first identified in Burkitt's lymphoma cells by Michael Anthony Epstein and Yvonne Barr at the University of Bristol in 1964. The link with infectious mononucleosis was uncovered in 1967 by Werner and Gertrude Henle at the Children's Hospital of Philadelphia, after a laboratory technician handling the virus contracted the disease: comparison of serum samples collected from the technician before and after the onset revealed development of antibodies to the virus.

Yale School of Public Health epidemiologist Alfred S. Evans confirmed through testing that mononucleosis was transmitted mainly through kissing, leading to it being referred to colloquially as "the kissing disease".
