= LILRA4 =

Protein-coding gene in the species Homo sapiens

Identifiers
- Aliases: LILRA4, CD85g, ILT7, leukocyte immunoglobulin like receptor A4
- External IDs: OMIM: 607517; GeneCards: LILRA4

Gene location (Human)
Chr.	Chromosome 19 (human)
Band	19q13.42	Start	54,333,185 bp
Band	19q13.42	End	54,339,162 bp
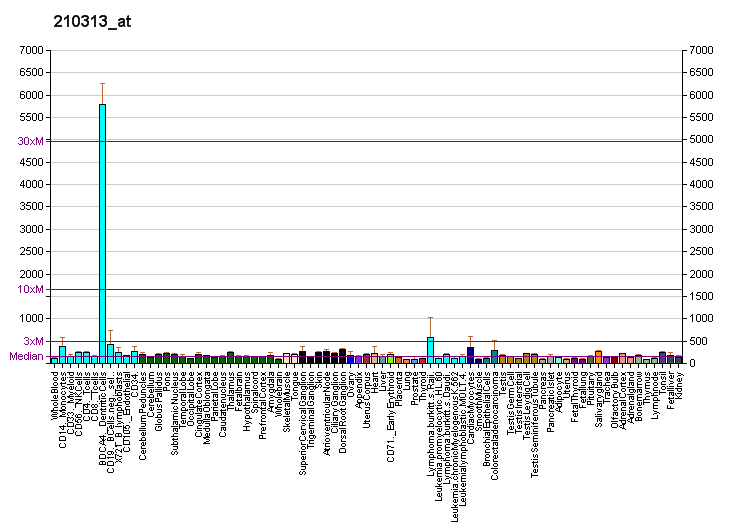
RNA expression pattern
Bgee	Human / Mouse (ortholog); Top expressed in: granulocyte; spleen; testicle; lymph node; monocyte; blood; appendix; C1 segment; gonad; substantia nigra / n/a; More reference expression data
BioGPS	More reference expression data
Gene ontology
Molecular function	protein binding; signaling receptor binding; coreceptor activity
Cellular component	membrane; integral component of membrane; integral component of plasma membrane; Fc-epsilon receptor I complex; plasma membrane
Biological process	immune system process; negative regulation of interferon-alpha production; negative regulation of tumor necrosis factor production; negative regulation of toll-like receptor 7 signaling pathway; negative regulation of toll-like receptor 9 signaling pathway; Fc-epsilon receptor signaling pathway; innate immune response
Sources:Amigo / QuickGO
Orthologs
Databases	NCBI: entry; OMA: entry
Species	Human	Mouse
Entrez	23547	n/a
Ensembl	ENSG00000277092; ENSG00000276798; ENSG00000274185; ENSG00000239961	n/a
UniProt	P59901	n/a
RefSeq (mRNA)	NM_012276	n/a
RefSeq (protein)	NP_036408	n/a
Location (UCSC)	Chr 19: 54.33 – 54.34 Mb	n/a
PubMed search		n/a
- Wikidata
View/Edit Human

Leukocyte immunoglobulin-like receptor subfamily A member 4 (LILR-A5) also known as CD85 antigen-like family member G (CD85g), and immunoglobulin-like transcript 7 (ILT-7) is a protein that in humans is encoded by the LILRA4 gene.

This gene encodes an immunoglobulin-like cell surface protein preferentially expressed in plasmacytoid dendritic cells (PDCs). This gene is highly expressed in PDCs, and is found to be rapidly down-regulated by interleukin 3 (IL3). This gene is one of the 19 highly related genes that form a leukocyte immunoglobulin-like receptor gene cluster (LRC) at chromosomal region 19q13.4.
