= LILRB2 =

Protein-coding gene in the species Homo sapiens

Identifiers
- Aliases: LILRB2, ILT4, MIR10, LIR2, MIR-10, LIR-2, leukocyte immunoglobulin like receptor B2, ILT-4, CD85D
- External IDs: OMIM: 604815; GeneCards: LILRB2

Gene location (Human)
Chr.	Chromosome 19 (human)
Band	19q13.42	Start	54,273,812 bp
Band	19q13.42	End	54,281,184 bp
RNA expression pattern
Bgee	Human / Mouse (ortholog); Top expressed in: monocyte; granulocyte; blood; spleen; appendix; bone marrow; bone marrow cell; right lung; upper lobe of left lung; testicle / n/a; More reference expression data
BioGPS	n/a
Orthologs
Databases	NCBI: entry; OMA: entry
Species	Human	Mouse
Entrez	10288	n/a
Ensembl	ENSG00000274513; ENSG00000275463; ENSG00000131042; ENSG00000276146; ENSG00000277751 n/a	n/a
UniProt	A2IXV5	n/a
RefSeq (mRNA)	NM_001080978; NM_001278403; NM_001278404; NM_001278405; NM_001278406 NM_005874	n/a
RefSeq (protein)	NP_001074447; NP_001265332; NP_001265333; NP_001265334; NP_001265335 NP_005865	n/a
Location (UCSC)	Chr 19: 54.27 – 54.28 Mb	n/a
PubMed search		n/a
- Wikidata
View/Edit Human

Leukocyte immunoglobulin-like receptor subfamily B member 2 is a protein that in humans is encoded by the LILRB2 gene.

This gene is a member of the leukocyte immunoglobulin-like receptor (LIR) family, which is found in a gene cluster at chromosomal region 19q13.4. The encoded protein belongs to the subfamily B class of LIR receptors which contain two or four extracellular immunoglobulin domains, a transmembrane domain, and two to four cytoplasmic immunoreceptor tyrosine-based inhibitory motifs (ITIMs). The receptor is expressed on immune cells where it binds to MHC class I molecules on antigen-presenting cells and transduces a negative signal that inhibits stimulation of an immune response. It is thought to control inflammatory responses and cytotoxicity to help focus the immune response and limit autoreactivity. Multiple transcript variants encoding different isoforms have been found for this gene.

LILBR2 plays a critical role in the inhibition of axonal regeneration and functional recovery after brain injury. However, recent studies demonstrate that LILRB2 is a β-Amyloid receptor and may contribute to synaptic loss and cognitive impairment in Alzheimer's disease.

== Interactions ==
LILRB2 has been shown to interact with PTPN6.

== See also ==
- Cluster of differentiation
