= Heterophile antibody =

Type of antibody

Heterophile antibodies are antibodies induced by external antigens that may be shared between species and are not well defined (heterophile antigens). They often have weak avidity for their targets.

Some heterophile antibodies cross-react with self-antigens. For example, in rheumatic fever, antibodies against group A streptococcal cell walls can also react with (and thus damage) human heart tissues. These are considered heterophile antibodies.

In clinical diagnosis, the heterophile antibody test specifically refers to a rapid test for antibodies produced against the Epstein-Barr virus (EBV), the causative agent of infectious mononucleosis.

Heterophile antibodies can cause significant interference in any immunoassay. The presence of a heterophile antibody is characterized by broad reactivity with antibodies of other animal species (which are often the source of the assay antibodies). Such antibodies are commonly referred to as human anti-animal antibodies (HAAA). Human anti-mouse antibodies (HAMA) belong to this category. They can create both false positive and false negative results.

So-called "sandwich" immunoassays are particularly susceptible to this interference. (Sandwich immunoassays are two-site, noncompetitive immunoassays in which the analyte in the unknown sample is bound to the antibody site, then labeled antibody is bound to the analyte. The amount of labeled antibody on the site is then measured. It will be directly proportional to the concentration of the analyte because labeled antibody will not bind if the analyte is not present in the unknown sample. This type is also known as sandwich assay as the analyte is "sandwiched" between two antibodies.) Heterophile antibodies may thus give false positives (by bridging the capture and signal antibody) or false negatives (by blocking one or the other). Both detecting and deterring this interference is difficult in clinical medicine. One option is to repeat the test using a different type of assay. Other options include the use of heterophile blocking reagents, steps to remove immunoglobulins, serial dilutions and using non-mammalian capture and/or detection antibodies.

Heterophile antibody interference does not usually change linearly with serial dilution, but a true result typically will. This is one strategy for heterophile antibody detection. However, there are cases where heterophilic antibodies will give a linear response to dilutions, as well as immunoassays that do not change linearly upon dilution, meaning that the method is not fool-proof.

Blocking heterophile antibody interference can be achieved by removal of immunoglobulins from a sample (such as with PEG), by modifying antibodies which may be present in a sample or by using buffers to reduce interference.

Heterophile antibodies are of particular importance in clinical medicine for their use in detecting Epstein-Barr Virus (the causative agent of infectious mononucleosis). EBV infection induces the production of several antibody classes, of which heterophile antibodies are one (others include anti-i, rheumatoid factor and ANA). Heterophile antibodies are IgM antibodies with affinity for sheep and horse red blood cells. They appear during the first week of infectious mononucleosis symptoms, 3–4 weeks after infection and return to undetectable levels 3 to 6 months after infection.

Heterophile antibody is a fairly specific but insensitive test for EBV. It is present in 80% of infected teens and adults, 40% of all infected children, and only 20% of infected children under age four. Heterophile antibodies can arise in non-EBV infections. False positive monospot tests may occur in cases of HIV, lymphoma, or systemic lupus erythematosus. Other assays for detection of EBV are available, including serologic markers.

An important clinical pearl for heterophile antibodies is they can also be seen in genetic immunodeficiencies. There have been case reports where women have undergone an exploratory laparotomy for suspected ectopic pregnancy after having a falsely elevated beta-hCG test, only to find out later they actually have selective IgA deficiency. Thus, another possible cause of false positives in a pregnancy test are heterophile antibodies, commonly seen in EBV infection as well as selective IgA deficiency.

== See also ==
- Heterophile antigen
