= LILRA2 =

Protein-coding gene in the species Homo sapiens

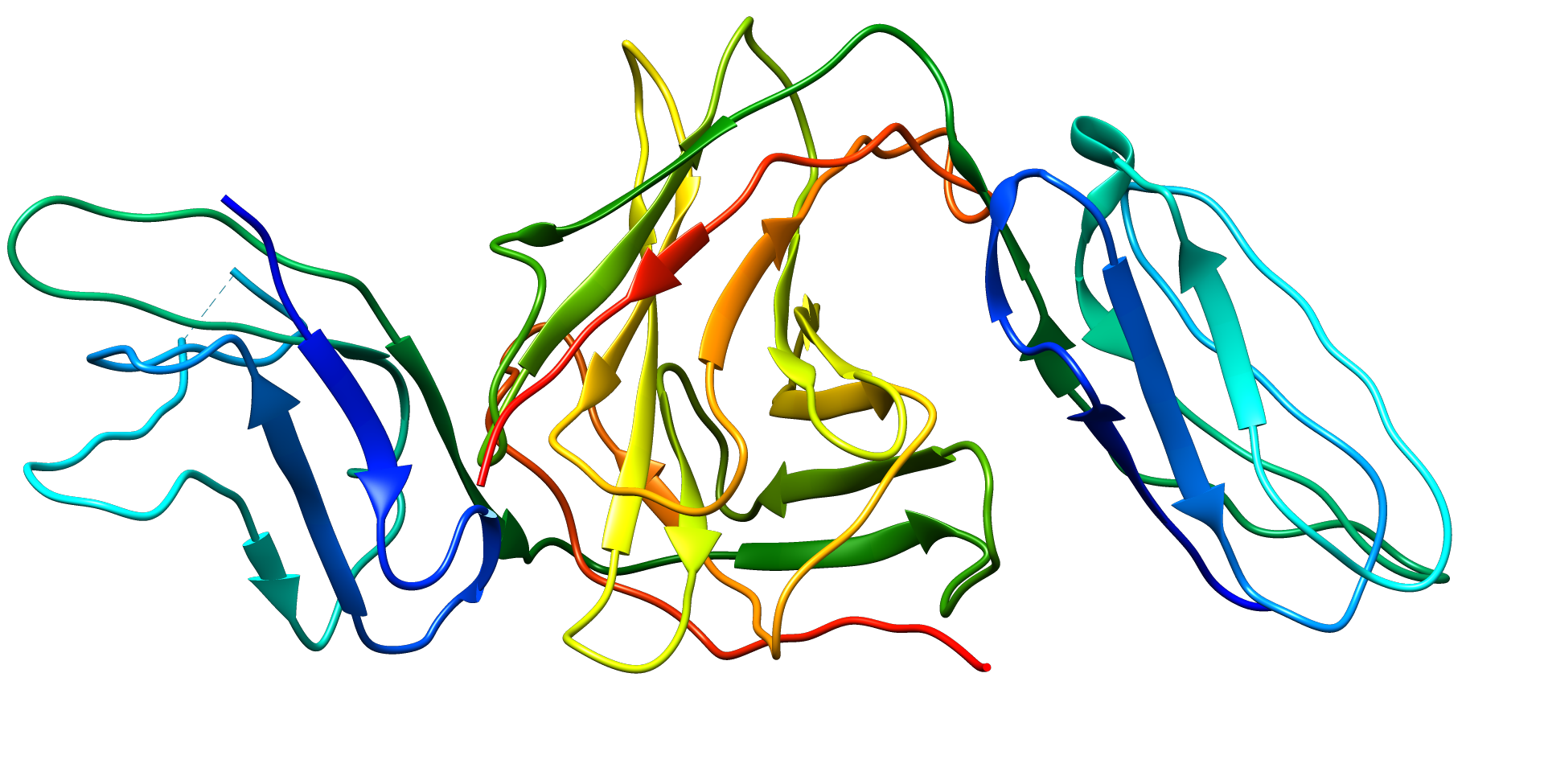

Identifiers
- Aliases: LILRA2, CD85H, ILT1, LIR-7, LIR7, leukocyte immunoglobulin like receptor A2
- External IDs: OMIM: 604812; GeneCards: LILRA2
Available structures
PDB	Human UniProt search: PDBe RCSB
PDB	List of PDB id codes 2OTP

Gene location (Human)
Chr.	Chromosome 19 (human)
Band	19q13.42	Start	54,572,920 bp
Band	19q13.42	End	54,590,287 bp
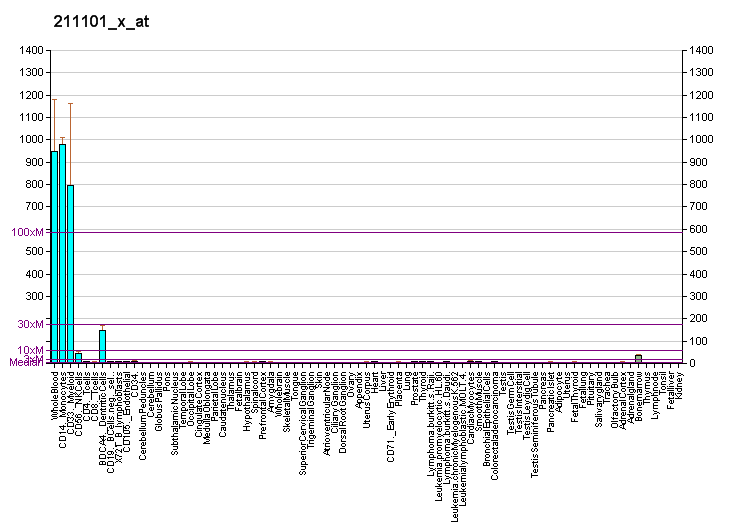

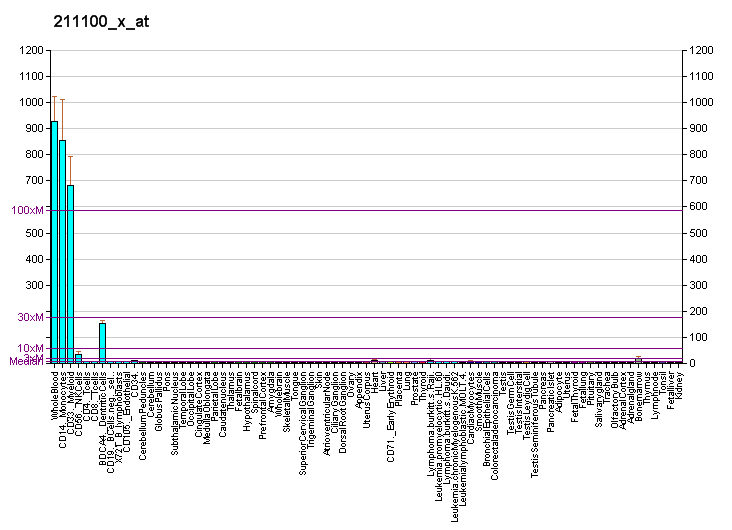

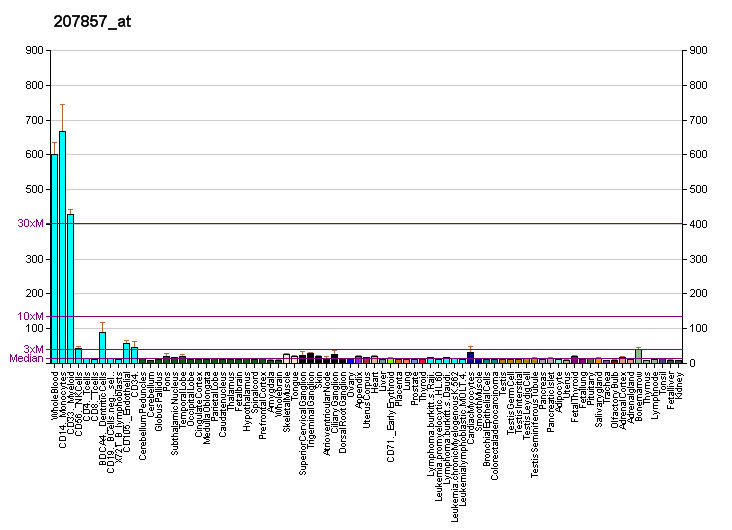
RNA expression pattern
Bgee	Human / Mouse (ortholog); Top expressed in: blood; granulocyte; monocyte; spleen; bone marrow; bone marrow cell; appendix; right lung; upper lobe of left lung; C1 segment / n/a; More reference expression data
BioGPS	More reference expression data
Gene ontology
Molecular function	antigen binding; IgM binding; signaling receptor activity
Cellular component	integral component of membrane; extracellular region; membrane; integral component of plasma membrane; plasma membrane
Biological process	defense response; signal transduction; immune system process; innate immune response activating cell surface receptor signaling pathway; neutrophil activation involved in immune response; negative regulation of lipopolysaccharide-mediated signaling pathway; granulocyte macrophage colony-stimulating factor production; interleukin-6 production; interleukin-8 production; negative regulation of toll-like receptor 4 signaling pathway; granulocyte colony-stimulating factor production; innate immune response; positive regulation of cell activation; positive regulation of calcium ion transport
Sources:Amigo / QuickGO
Orthologs
Databases	NCBI: entry; OMA: entry
Species	Human	Mouse
Entrez	11027	n/a
Ensembl	ENSG00000239998; ENSG00000274000; ENSG00000275290; ENSG00000278634	n/a
UniProt	Q8N149	n/a
RefSeq (mRNA)	NM_001130917; NM_001290270; NM_001290271; NM_006866	n/a
RefSeq (protein)	NP_001124389; NP_001277199; NP_001277200; NP_006857	n/a
Location (UCSC)	Chr 19: 54.57 – 54.59 Mb	n/a
PubMed search		n/a
- Wikidata
View/Edit Human

Leukocyte immunoglobulin-like receptor subfamily A member 2 (LILRA2, CD85H, ILT1) is a protein that in humans is encoded by the LILRA2 gene.

Leukocyte Ig-like receptors (LIRs) are a family of immunoreceptors expressed predominantly on monocytes and B cells and at lower levels on dendritic cells and natural killer (NK) cells. All LIRs in subfamily B have an inhibitory function (see, e.g., LILRB1, MIM 604811). LIRs in subfamily A, with short cytoplasmic domains lacking an immunoreceptor tyrosine-based inhibitory motif (ITIM) and with transmembrane regions containing a charged arginine residue, may initiate stimulatory cascades. One member of subfamily A (LILRA3; MIM 604818) lacks a transmembrane region and is presumed to be a soluble receptor.[supplied by OMIM]

== Function ==
LILRA2 senses microbially cleaved immunoglobulin to activate human myeloid cells.

== See also ==
- Cluster of differentiation
