= LILRB1 =

Protein-coding gene in the species Homo sapiens

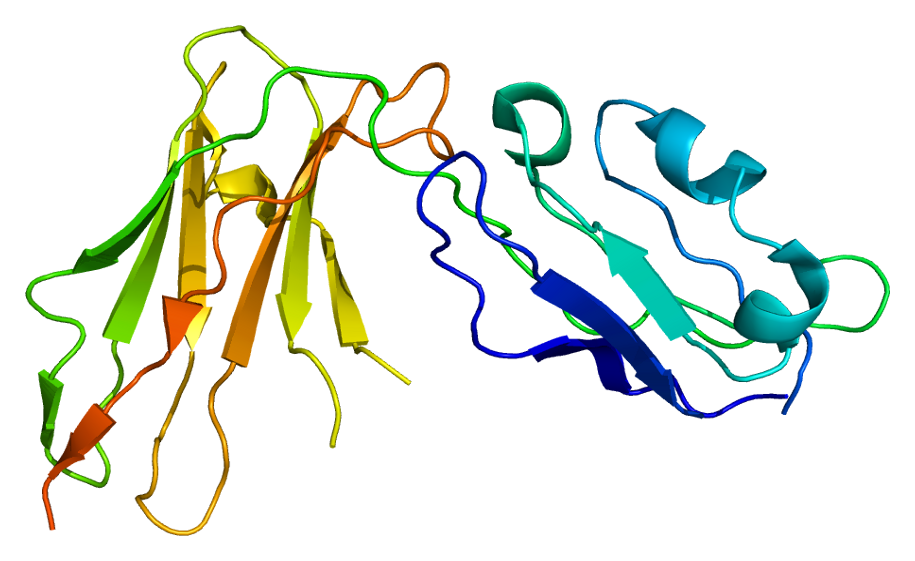

Identifiers
- Aliases: LILRB1, CD85J, ILT-2, ILT2, LIR-1, LIR1, MIR-7, MIR7, PIR-B, PIRB, leukocyte immunoglobulin like receptor B1
- External IDs: OMIM: 604811; GeneCards: LILRB1
Available structures
| PDB | Human UniProt search: PDBe RCSB |
| PDB | List of PDB id codes 1G0X, 1P7Q, 1UFU, 1UGN, 1VDG, 3D2U, 4LL9, 4NO0 |

Gene location (Human)
| Chr. | Chromosome 19 (human) |
| Band | 19q13.42 | Start | 54,617,158 bp |
| Band | 19q13.42 | End | 54,638,022 bp |
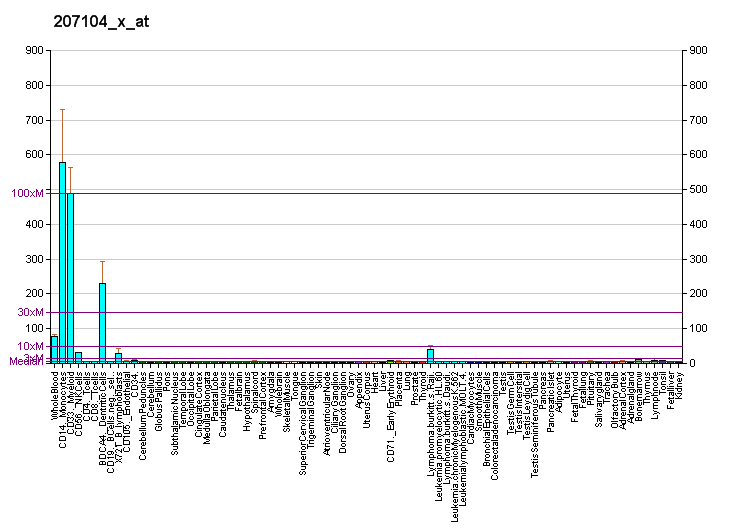

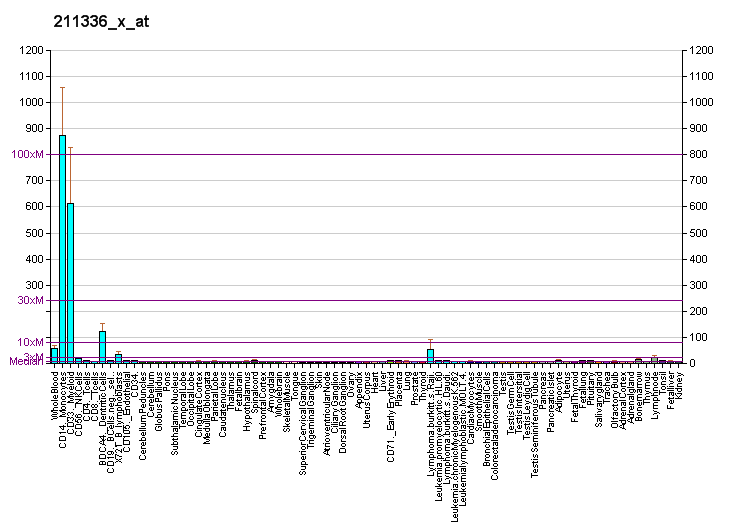
RNA expression pattern
| Bgee | Human / Mouse (ortholog); Top expressed in: spleen; monocyte; appendix; granulocyte; blood; lymph node; bone marrow cell; upper lobe of left lung; right lung; C1 segment / n/a; More reference expression data |
| BioGPS | More reference expression data |
Gene ontology
| Molecular function | protein homodimerization activity; MHC class I receptor activity; SH2 domain binding; protein phosphatase 1 binding; HLA-A specific inhibitory MHC class I receptor activity; HLA-B specific inhibitory MHC class I receptor activity; MHC class I protein binding; amyloid-beta binding; protein binding; MHC class Ib receptor activity; MHC class Ib protein complex binding; MHC class Ib protein binding |
| Cellular component | cytoplasm; integral component of membrane; membrane; plasma membrane; extracellular region; external side of plasma membrane |
| Biological process | negative regulation of endocytosis; dendritic cell differentiation; negative regulation of mononuclear cell proliferation; negative regulation of interferon-gamma production; adaptive immune response; Fc receptor mediated inhibitory signaling pathway; negative regulation of osteoclast development; immune system process; response to virus; receptor internalization; negative regulation of cell cycle; negative regulation of cytokine production involved in immune response; negative regulation of serotonin secretion; T cell proliferation involved in immune response; negative regulation of alpha-beta T cell activation; negative regulation of T cell mediated cytotoxicity; positive regulation of cytolysis; negative regulation of T cell proliferation; positive regulation of gene expression; defense response to virus; negative regulation of calcium ion transport; regulation of immune response; positive regulation of apoptotic process; negative regulation of natural killer cell mediated cytotoxicity; negative regulation of T cell activation via T cell receptor contact with antigen bound to MHC molecule on antigen presenting cell; cellular response to lipopolysaccharide; immune response-inhibiting cell surface receptor signaling pathway; positive regulation of gamma-delta T cell activation involved in immune response; negative regulation of dendritic cell apoptotic process; negative regulation of dendritic cell differentiation; signal transduction; positive regulation of transcription by RNA polymerase II; negative regulation of CD8-positive, alpha-beta T cell activation; positive regulation of defense response to virus by host; positive regulation of macrophage cytokine production |
Sources:Amigo / QuickGO
Orthologs
| Databases | NCBI: entry; OMA: entry |
| Species | Human | Mouse |
| Entrez | 10859 | n/a |
| Ensembl | ENSG00000104972; ENSG00000276452; ENSG00000277134; ENSG00000274669; ENSG00000277807 n/a | n/a |
| UniProt | Q8NHL6 | n/a |
| RefSeq (mRNA) | NM_001081637; NM_001081638; NM_001081639; NM_001278398; NM_001278399 NM_006669; NM_001388355; NM_001388356; NM_001388357; NM_001388358 | n/a |
| RefSeq (protein) | NP_001075106; NP_001075107; NP_001075108; NP_001265327; NP_001265328 NP_006660 | n/a |
| Location (UCSC) | Chr 19: 54.62 – 54.64 Mb | n/a |
| PubMed search | | n/a |
- Wikidata
| View/Edit Human |

Leukocyte immunoglobulin-like receptor subfamily B member 1 is a protein that in humans is encoded by the LILRB1 gene.

== Function ==
This gene is a member of the leukocyte immunoglobulin-like receptor (LIR) family, which is found in a gene cluster at chromosomal region 19q13.4. The encoded protein belongs to the subfamily B class of LIR receptors which contain two or four extracellular immunoglobulin domains, a transmembrane domain, and two to four cytoplasmic immunoreceptor tyrosine-based inhibitory motifs (ITIMs). The receptor is expressed on immune cells where it binds to MHC class I molecules on antigen-presenting cells and transduces a negative signal that inhibits stimulation of an immune response. It is thought to control inflammatory responses and cytotoxicity to help focus the immune response and limit autoreactivity. Multiple transcript variants encoding different isoforms have been found for this gene.

== See also ==
- Cluster of differentiation
