= LILRA1 =

Protein-coding gene in the species Homo sapiens

Identifiers
- Aliases: LILRA1, CD85I, LIR-6, LIR6, leukocyte immunoglobulin like receptor A1
- External IDs: OMIM: 604810; GeneCards: LILRA1

Gene location (Human)
Chr.	Chromosome 19 (human)
Band	19q13.42	Start	54,593,582 bp
Band	19q13.42	End	54,602,381 bp
RNA expression pattern
Bgee	Human / Mouse (ortholog); Top expressed in: monocyte; granulocyte; blood; spleen; appendix; testicle; bone marrow; bone marrow cell; right lung; upper lobe of left lung / n/a; More reference expression data
BioGPS	n/a
Gene ontology
Molecular function	antigen binding; transmembrane signaling receptor activity
Cellular component	integral component of membrane; plasma membrane; membrane
Biological process	defense response; cell surface receptor signaling pathway; adaptive immune response; regulation of immune response; immune system process
Sources:Amigo / QuickGO
Orthologs
Databases	NCBI: entry; OMA: entry
Species	Human	Mouse
Entrez	11024	n/a
Ensembl	ENSG00000275525; ENSG00000277398; ENSG00000104974; ENSG00000274935	n/a
UniProt	O75019	n/a
RefSeq (mRNA)	NM_001278318; NM_001278319; NM_006863	n/a
RefSeq (protein)	NP_001265247; NP_001265248; NP_006854	n/a
Location (UCSC)	Chr 19: 54.59 – 54.6 Mb	n/a
PubMed search		n/a
- Wikidata
View/Edit Human

Leukocyte immunoglobulin-like receptor, subfamily A (with TM domain), member 1 is a protein that in humans is encoded by the LILRA1 gene.
