= Tetraspanin =

Tetraspanin family
- Tetraspanins have four transmembrane domains, two extracellular loops and contain a series of highly conserved amino acid residues.

Identifiers
- Symbol: Tetraspanin
- Pfam: PF00335
- Pfam clan: CL0347
- InterPro: IPR000301
- PROSITE: PDOC00371
- SCOP2: 1iv5 / SCOPe / SUPFAM
- TCDB: 8.A.40
- OPM superfamily: 327
- OPM protein: 5tcx
- CDD: cd03127
Available protein structures:
- PDB: IPR000301 PF00335 (ECOD; PDBsum)
- AlphaFold: IPR000301; PF00335

Hypothetical model of the tetraspanin function

Tetraspanins are a family of membrane proteins found in all multicellular eukaryotes also referred to as the transmembrane 4 superfamily (TM4SF) proteins. These proteins have four transmembrane alpha-helices and two extracellular domains, one short (called the small extracellular domain or loop, SED/SEL or EC1) and one longer, typically 100 amino acid residues (the large extracellular domain/loop, LED/LEL or EC2). Although several protein families have four transmembrane alpha-helices, tetraspanins are defined by conserved amino acid sequences including four or more cysteine residues in the EC2 domain, with two in a highly conserved 'CCG' motif. Tetraspanins are often thought to act as scaffolding proteins, anchoring multiple proteins to one area of the cell membrane.

Tetraspanins are highly conserved between species. Some tetraspanins can have N-linked glycosylations on the long extracellular loop (LEL, EC2) and palmitoylations at a CXXC motif in their transmembrane region.

There are 34 tetraspanins in mammals, 33 of which have also been identified in humans. Tetraspanins display numerous properties that indicate their physiological importance in cell adhesion, motility, activation, and proliferation, as well as their contribution to pathological conditions such as metastasis or viral infection.

A role for tetraspanins in platelets was demonstrated by the bleeding phenotypes of CD151- and TSSC6-deficient mice, which exhibit impaired "outside-in" signalling through α_{IIb}β_{3}, the major platelet integrin. It is hypothesized that tetraspanins interact with and regulate other platelet receptors.

== List of human tetraspanins ==
Protein	Gene	Aliases
TSPAN1	TSPAN1	TSP-1
TSPAN2	TSPAN2	TSP-2
TSPAN3	TSPAN3	TSP-3
TSPAN4	TSPAN4	TSP-4, NAG-2
TSPAN5	TSPAN5	TSP-5
TSPAN6	TSPAN6	TSP-6
TSPAN7	TSPAN7	CD231/TALLA-1/A15
TSPAN8	TSPAN8	CO-029
TSPAN9	TSPAN9	NET-5
TSPAN10	TSPAN10	OCULOSPANIN
TSPAN11	TSPAN11	CD151-like
TSPAN12	TSPAN12	NET-2
TSPAN13	TSPAN13	NET-6
TSPAN14	TSPAN14	
TSPAN15	TSPAN15	NET-7
TSPAN16	TSPAN16	TM4-B
TSPAN17	TSPAN17	
TSPAN18	TSPAN18	
TSPAN19	TSPAN19	
TSPAN20	UPK1B	UP1b, UPK1B
TSPAN21	TSPAN21	UP1a, UPK1A
TSPAN22	PRPH2	RDS, PRPH2
TSPAN23	TSPAN23	ROM1
TSPAN24	CD151	CD151
TSPAN25	CD53	CD53
TSPAN26	CD37	CD37
TSPAN27	CD82	CD82
TSPAN28	CD81	CD81
TSPAN29	CD9	CD9
TSPAN30	CD63	CD63
TSPAN31	TSPAN31	SAS
TSPAN32	TSPAN32	TSSC6
TSPAN33	TSPAN33	

== See also ==
- List of human clusters of differentiation

== Relevance to parasite vaccines ==
The schistosome worms make two tetraspanins: TSP-1 and TSP-2. TSP-2 antibodies are found in some people who seem to have immunity to schistosome infection (Schistosomiasis).
