= CD81 =

Mammalian protein found in humans

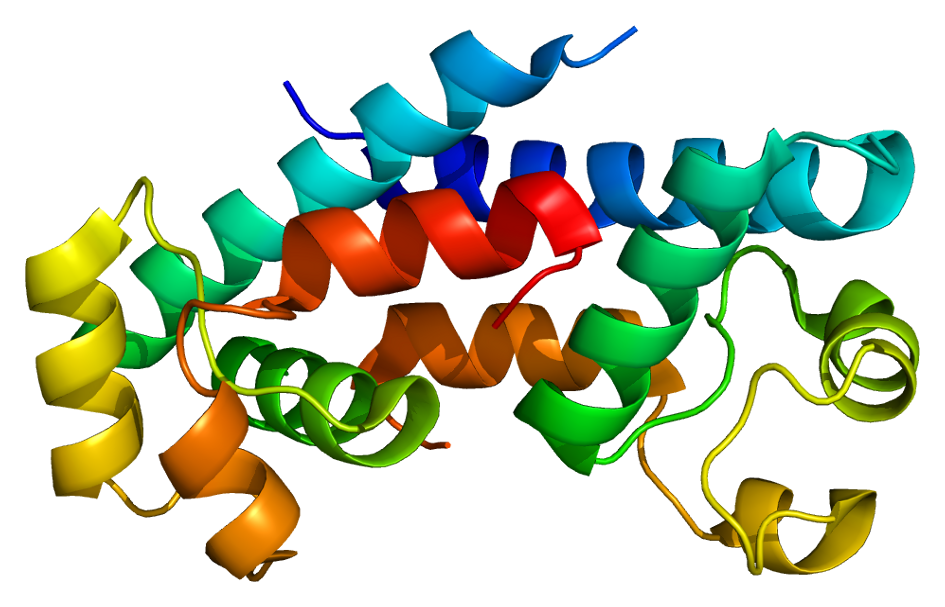

Identifiers
- Aliases: CD81, CVID6, S5.7, TAPA1, TSPAN28, CD81 molecule
- External IDs: OMIM: 186845; MGI: 1096398; GeneCards: CD81
Available structures
PDB	Ortholog search: PDBe RCSB
PDB	List of PDB id codes 1G8Q, 1IV5, 3X0E, 5DFW, 5DFV

Gene location (Human)
Chr.	Chromosome 11 (human)
Band	11p15.5	Start	2,376,177 bp
Band	11p15.5	End	2,397,397 bp

Gene location (Mouse)
Chr.	Chromosome 7 (mouse)
Band	7 F5|7 88.1 cM	Start	142,606,476 bp
Band	7 F5|7 88.1 cM	End	142,621,671 bp
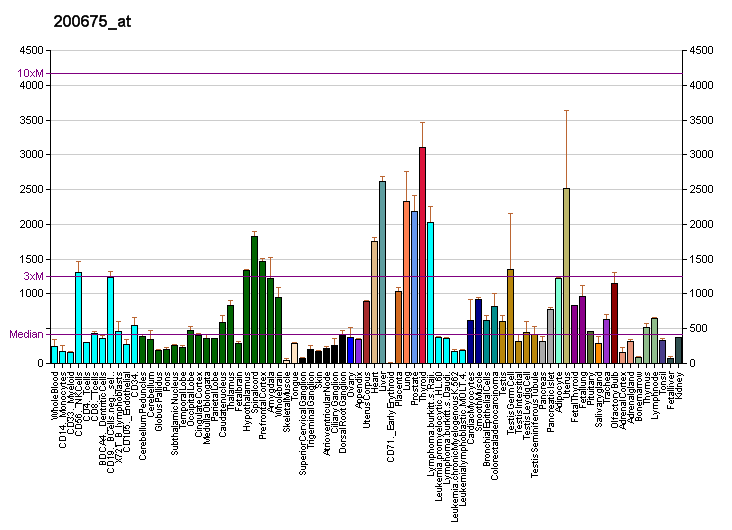
RNA expression pattern
Bgee	Human / Mouse (ortholog); Top expressed in: stromal cell of endometrium; seminal vesicula; body of uterus; right coronary artery; canal of the cervix; right uterine tube; Descending thoracic aorta; left uterine tube; ascending aorta; apex of heart / Top expressed in: aortic valve; ascending aorta; anterior horn of spinal cord; Epithelium of choroid plexus; efferent ductule; dentate gyrus of hippocampal formation granule cell; molar; optic nerve; external carotid artery; choroid plexus of fourth ventricle; More reference expression data
BioGPS	More reference expression data
Gene ontology
Molecular function	protein binding; MHC class II protein complex binding; transferrin receptor binding; virus receptor activity; integrin binding; cholesterol binding; lipid binding
Cellular component	integral component of membrane; vesicle; membrane; focal adhesion; integral component of plasma membrane; immunological synapse; extracellular exosome; plasma membrane; basolateral plasma membrane
Biological process	positive regulation of 1-phosphatidylinositol 4-kinase activity; protein localization; regulation of protein stability; receptor internalization; cellular response to low-density lipoprotein particle stimulus; regulation of cell motility; receptor-mediated virion attachment to host cell; protein localization to lysosome; cell surface receptor signaling pathway; positive regulation of B cell proliferation; positive regulation of cell population proliferation; regulation of immune response; positive regulation of peptidyl-tyrosine phosphorylation; viral entry into host cell; positive regulation of protein catabolic process in the vacuole; cell population proliferation; viral process; positive regulation of transcription by RNA polymerase II; regulation of complement activation; humoral immune response mediated by circulating immunoglobulin; protein localization to plasma membrane; adaptive immune response; immune system process
Sources:Amigo / QuickGO
Orthologs
Databases	NCBI: entry; OMA: entry
Species	Human	Mouse
Entrez	975	12520
Ensembl	ENSG00000110651	ENSMUSG00000037706
UniProt	P60033	P35762
RefSeq (mRNA)	NM_001297649; NM_004356	NM_133655
RefSeq (protein)	NP_001284578; NP_004347	NP_598416
Location (UCSC)	Chr 11: 2.38 – 2.4 Mb	Chr 7: 142.61 – 142.62 Mb
PubMed search
- Wikidata
View/Edit Human	View/Edit Mouse

CD81 molecule, also known as CD81 (Cluster of Differentiation 81), is a protein which in humans is encoded by the CD81 gene. It is also known as 26 kDa cell surface protein, TAPA-1 (Target of the Antiproliferative Antibody 1), and Tetraspanin-28 (Tspan-28).

== Gene ==
The gene is located on the plus strand of the short arm of chromosome 11 (11p15.5). It is 20,103 bases in length and encodes a protein of 236 amino acids (predicted molecular weight 25.809 kDa).

The protein does not appear to be post translationally modified and has four transmembrane domains. Both the N-terminus and C-terminus lie on the intracellular side of the membrane.

The gene is expressed in hemopoietic, endothelial, and epithelial cells. It is absent from erythrocytes, platelets, and neutrophils.

== Function ==
The protein encoded by this gene is a member of the transmembrane 4 superfamily, also known as the tetraspanin family. Most of these members are cell-surface proteins that are characterized by the presence of four hydrophobic domains. The proteins mediate signal transduction events that play a role in the regulation of cell development, activation, growth and motility. This encoded protein is a cell surface glycoprotein that is known to complex with integrins. This protein appears to promote muscle cell fusion and support myotube maintenance. Also it may be involved in signal transduction. This gene is localized in the tumor-suppressor gene region and thus it is a candidate gene for malignancies.

The tetraspanin family includes CD9, CD37, CD53, CD63, CD81 (this protein), CD82 and CD151.

CD81 interacts directly with immunoglobulin superfamily member 8 (IGSF8, CD316) and CD36. It forms a signal transduction complex with CD19, CD21 and Leu-13 (CD225) on the surface of the B cell. On T cells CD81 associates with CD4 and CD8 and provides a costimulatory signal with CD3.

== Clinical significance ==
This protein plays a critical role in Hepatitis C attachment and/or cell entry by interacting with virus' E1/E2 glycoproteins heterodimer. The large extracellular loop of CD81 binds the hepatitis E2 glycoprotein dimer. HCV-E2 and CD81 binding Kd is 1.8 nM. HCV-E2 engaged CD81 is only 30% internalized after 12hr, suggesting CD81 may be primarily an attachment receptor for HCV.

It also appears to play a role in liver invasion by Plasmodium species. CD81 is required for Plasmodium vivax sporozoite entry into human hepatocytes and for Plasmodium yoelii sporozoite entry into murine hepatocytes.

HIV gag proteins use tetraspanin enriched microdomains (containing minimally CD81, CD82, CD63) as a platform for virion assembly and release. Purified HIV produced by MOLT\HIV cells contains CD81. Anti-CD81 antibodies downregulate HIV production 3 fold, however the CD81 protein free virus is more infectious. Engagement of CD81 lowers the signaling threshold required to trigger T-Cell\CD3 mediated proviral DNA in CD4+ T cells.

CD81 appears to play a role in the pathogenesis of influenza.

== Interactions ==
CD81 has been shown to interact with TSPAN4, CD19, CD9, PTGFRN, CD117 and CD29.

=== Ligands ===
Benzyl salicylate and terfenadine have been shown to bind to CD81.

== See also ==
- Cluster of differentiation
