= ADI1 =

Protein-coding gene in humans

Identifiers
- Aliases: ADI1, APL1, ARD, Fe-ARD, MTCBP1, Ni-ARD, SIPL, mtnD, HMFT1638, acireductone dioxygenase 1
- External IDs: OMIM: 613400; MGI: 2144929; GeneCards: ADI1
Available structures
PDB	Ortholog search: PDBe RCSB
PDB	List of PDB id codes 4QGN
Enzyme activity
EC #	BRENDA	ExPASy	KEGG	MetaCyc
1.13.11.53	↗	↗	↗	↗
1.13.11.54	↗	↗	↗	↗

Gene location (Mouse)
Chr.	Chromosome 12 (mouse)
Band	12|12 A2	Start	28,725,230 bp
Band	12|12 A2	End	28,732,174 bp
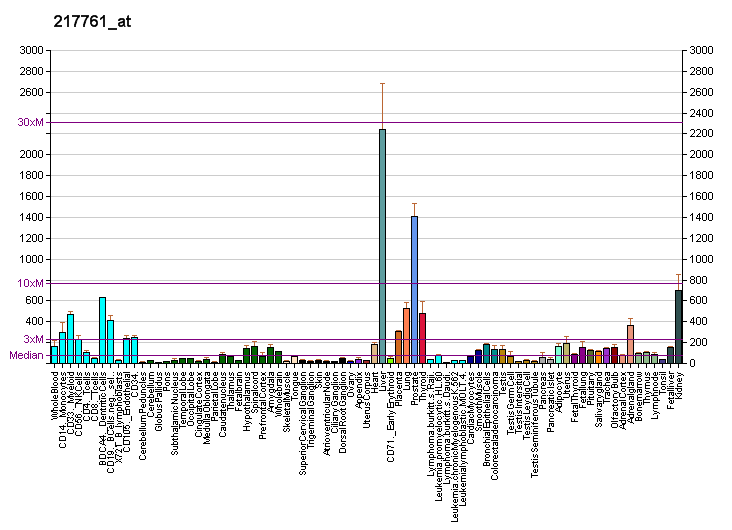
RNA expression pattern
Bgee	Human / Mouse (ortholog); Top expressed in: right lobe of liver; kidney; ascending aorta; duodenum; left ventricle; right coronary artery; left coronary artery; gallbladder; fundus; left adrenal gland / Top expressed in: left lobe of liver; muscle of thigh; Paneth cell; right kidney; triceps brachii muscle; embryo; crypt of lieberkuhn of small intestine; medial head of gastrocnemius muscle; tail of embryo; vastus lateralis muscle; More reference expression data
BioGPS	More reference expression data
Gene ontology
Molecular function	protein binding; dioxygenase activity; metal ion binding; oxidoreductase activity; acireductone dioxygenase [iron(II)-requiring activity]; iron ion binding
Cellular component	cytosol; membrane; plasma membrane; nucleus; cytoplasm
Biological process	methionine biosynthetic process; cellular amino acid biosynthetic process; L-methionine salvage from methylthioadenosine; methionine metabolic process
Sources:Amigo / QuickGO
Orthologs
Databases	NCBI: entry
Species	Human	Mouse
Entrez	55256	104923
Ensembl	n/a	ENSMUSG00000020629
UniProt	Q9BV57	Q99JT9
RefSeq (mRNA)	NM_001306077; NM_018269	NM_134052
RefSeq (protein)	NP_001293006; NP_060739	NP_598813
Location (UCSC)	n/a	Chr 12: 28.73 – 28.73 Mb
PubMed search
- Wikidata
View/Edit Human	View/Edit Mouse

The human ADI1 gene encodes the enzyme 1,2-dihydroxy-3-keto-5-methylthiopentene dioxygenase.

== Function ==
The enzyme belongs to the aci-reductone dioxygenase family of metal-binding enzymes, which are involved in methionine salvage. This enzyme may regulate mRNA processing in the nucleus, and may carry out different functions depending on its localization.

== Clinical significance ==
Diseases associated with ADI1 include Klebsiella, and refsum disease.

ADI1 is capable for supporting hepatitis C virus replication in an otherwise non-permissive cell line. Mouse hepatoma cells coexpressing human CD81 and ADI1/Sip-L supported HCV infection and replication. Human ADI1//Sip-L over-expression in 293 cells enhances cell entry but not replication of HCV.
