= CD9 =

Human protein-encoding gene

Identifiers
- Aliases: CD9, BTCC-1, DRAP-27, MIC3, MRP-1, TSPAN-29, TSPAN29, CD9 molecule
- External IDs: OMIM: 143030; MGI: 88348; GeneCards: CD9

Gene location (Human)
Chr.	Chromosome 12 (human)
Band	12p13.31	Start	6,199,715 bp
Band	12p13.31	End	6,238,271 bp

Gene location (Mouse)
Chr.	Chromosome 6 (mouse)
Band	6 F3|6 59.32 cM	Start	125,437,229 bp
Band	6 F3|6 59.32 cM	End	125,471,754 bp
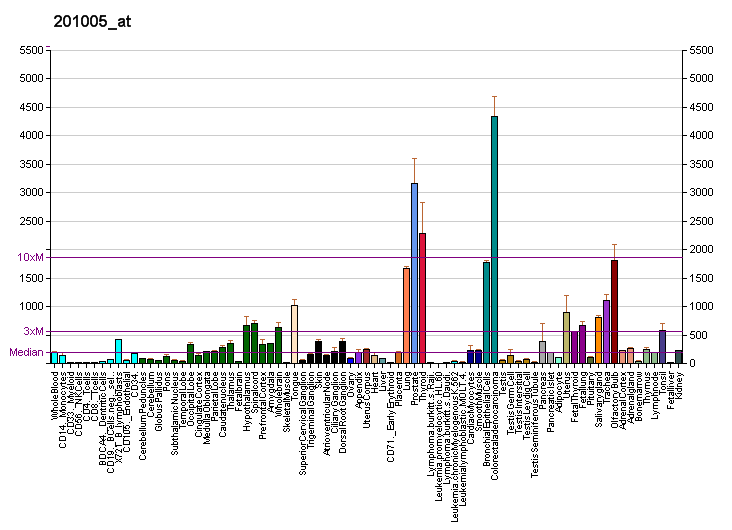
RNA expression pattern
Bgee	Human / Mouse (ortholog); Top expressed in: mucosa of pharynx; seminal vesicula; mucosa of sigmoid colon; trigeminal ganglion; Achilles tendon; synovial joint; urethra; bronchial epithelial cell; oral cavity; mucosa of nose / Top expressed in: skin of external ear; right lung lobe; seminal vesicula; transitional epithelium of urinary bladder; left lung; granulocyte; parotid gland; lip; left lung lobe; left colon; More reference expression data
BioGPS	More reference expression data
Gene ontology
Molecular function	integrin binding; protein binding
Cellular component	integral component of membrane; external side of plasma membrane; endocytic vesicle membrane; membrane; cell surface; plasma membrane; clathrin-coated endocytic vesicle membrane; focal adhesion; extracellular vesicle; platelet alpha granule membrane; apical plasma membrane; extracellular exosome; extracellular space; integral component of plasma membrane; extracellular region
Biological process	negative regulation of cell population proliferation; paranodal junction assembly; platelet degranulation; cell surface receptor signaling pathway; response to water deprivation; oligodendrocyte development; receptor internalization; fusion of sperm to egg plasma membrane involved in single fertilization; cell adhesion; brain development; cellular response to low-density lipoprotein particle stimulus; single fertilization; platelet activation; negative regulation of platelet aggregation; sperm-egg recognition; myoblast fusion involved in skeletal muscle regeneration; regulation of macrophage migration
Sources:Amigo / QuickGO
Orthologs
Databases	NCBI: entry; OMA: entry
Species	Human	Mouse
Entrez	928	12527
Ensembl	ENSG00000010278	ENSMUSG00000030342
UniProt	P21926	P40240
RefSeq (mRNA)	NM_001769; NM_001330312	NM_007657
RefSeq (protein)	NP_001317241; NP_001760	NP_031683
Location (UCSC)	Chr 12: 6.2 – 6.24 Mb	Chr 6: 125.44 – 125.47 Mb
PubMed search
- Wikidata
View/Edit Human	View/Edit Mouse

Crystal structure of human CD9

CD9 is a gene encoding a protein that is a member of the transmembrane 4 superfamily also known as the tetraspanin family. It is a cell surface glycoprotein that consists of four transmembrane regions and has two extracellular loops that contain disulfide bonds which are conserved throughout the tetraspanin family. Also containing distinct palmitoylation sites that allows CD9 to interact with lipids and other proteins.

== Function ==
Tetraspanin proteins are involved in a multitude of biological processes such as adhesion, motility, membrane fusion, signaling and protein trafficking. Tetraspanins play a role in many biological processes because of their ability to interact with many different proteins including interactions between each other. Their distinct palmitoylation sites allow them to organize on the membrane into tetraspanin-enriched microdomains (TEM). These TEMs are thought to play a role in many cellular processes including exosome biogenesis. CD9 is commonly used as a marker for exosomes as it is contained on their surface.

However, in some cases CD9 plays a larger role in the ability of exosomes to be more or less pathogenic. Shown in HIV-1 infection, exosomes are able to enhance HIV-1 entry through tetraspanin CD9 and CD81. However, expression of CD9 on the cellular membrane seems to decrease the viral entry of HIV-1.

CD9 has a diverse role in cellular processes as it has also been shown to trigger platelet activation and aggregation. It forms an alphaIIbbeta3-CD9-CD63 complex on the surface of platelets that interacts directly with other cells such as neutrophils which may assist in immune response. In addition, the protein appears to promote muscle cell fusion and support myotube maintenance. Also, playing a key role in egg-sperm fusion during mammalian fertilization. While oocytes are ovulated, CD9-deficient oocytes do not properly fuse with sperm upon fertilization. CD9 is located in the microvillar membrane of the oocytes and also appears to intervene in maintaining the normal shape of oocyte microvilli.

CD9 can also modulate cell adhesion and migration. This function makes CD9 of interest when studying cancer and cancer metastasis. However, it seems CD9 has a varying role in different types of cancers. Studies showed that CD9 expression levels have an inverse correlation to metastatic potential or patient survival. The over expression of CD9 was shown to decrease metastasis in certain types of melanoma, breast, lung, pancreas and colon carcinomas. However, in other studies, CD9 has been shown to increase migration or be highly expressed in metastatic cancers in various cell lines such as lung cancer, scirrhous-type gastric cancer, hepatocellular carcinoma, acute lymphoblastic leukemia, and breast cancer. Suggesting based on the cancer CD9 can be a tumor suppressor or promotor. It has also been suggested that CD9 has an effect on the ability for cancer cells to develop chemoresistance.

Additionally, CD9 has been shown to block adhesion of Staphylococcus aureus to wounds. The adhesion is essential for infection of the wound. This suggests that CD9 could be of possible use to as treatment for skin infection by Staphylococcus aureus.

== Interactions ==
CD9 has been shown to interact with:

- CD117,
- CD29
- CD46,
- CD49c,
- CD81,
- PTGFRN,
- TSPAN4.
- CD63
- ADAM17
- CD81

== See also ==
- Tetraspanin
- Myogenesis
- Fertilisation
