= TEX55 =

Protein-coding gene in the species Homo sapiens

Identifiers
- Aliases: TEX55, TSCPA, chromosome 3 open reading frame 30, testis expressed 55, C3orf30
- External IDs: MGI: 1921913; HomoloGene: 17614; GeneCards: TEX55; OMA:TEX55 - orthologs

Gene location (Human)
Chr.	Chromosome 3 (human)
Band	3q13.32	Start	119,146,151 bp
Band	3q13.32	End	119,160,042 bp

Gene location (Mouse)
Chr.	Chromosome 16 (mouse)
Band	16|16 B4	Start	38,632,568 bp
Band	16|16 B4	End	38,649,111 bp
RNA expression pattern
Bgee	Human / Mouse (ortholog); Top expressed in: left testis; right testis; testicle; olfactory zone of nasal mucosa; ventricular zone; muscle of thigh; human kidney; placenta; blood; islet of Langerhans / Top expressed in: seminiferous tubule; spermatid; spermatocyte; digastric muscle; islet of Langerhans; More reference expression data
BioGPS	n/a
Orthologs
Species	Human	Mouse
Entrez	152405	74663
Ensembl	ENSG00000163424	ENSMUSG00000022798
UniProt	Q96M34	A6X8Z9
RefSeq (mRNA)	NM_152539	NM_029042
RefSeq (protein)	NP_689752	NP_083318
Location (UCSC)	Chr 3: 119.15 – 119.16 Mb	Chr 16: 38.63 – 38.65 Mb
PubMed search
- Wikidata
View/Edit Human	View/Edit Mouse

Testis expressed 55 (TEX55) is a human protein that is encoded by the C3orf30 gene located on the forward strand of human chromosome three, open reading frame 30 (3q13.32). TEX55 (accession number: NM_152539.3) is also known as Testis-specific conserved, cAMP-dependent type II PK anchoring protein (TSCPA), and uncharacterized protein C3orf30.

== Gene ==
The TEX55 gene is 13,893 bp and spans from base pair 119,146,151 to 119,160,042. This gene is flanked by immunoglobulin superfamily member 11 and Uroplakin1B.

Conceptual translation of the TEX55 gene. This image is formed from a compilation of a number of different bioinformatics tools.

=== Promoter ===
The promoter region of TEX55 has multiple SRY box-6 and SOX/SRY-sex/testis determining and related HMG box transcription factor binding sites, as well as an X-linked zinc finger binding site. This indicates that the sex chromosomes may play a role in post-translational modification and expression.

== Homology ==
=== Paralogs ===
The TEX55 protein has no known human paralogs.

=== Orthologs ===
TEX55 has orthologs in many mammals including, bats, dolphins, and even aardvarks. According to BLAST the TEX55 protein cannot be found outside of clade Mammalia. The most distant ortholog, found using BLAST, was in the aardvark, which is thought to have diverged an estimated 105 MYA. However, according to GeneCard, distant orthologs have also been found in chickens, lizards (Anolis carolinensis), and zebrafish.

== mRNA ==
The mRNA of TEX55 is 1800 base pairs long and has three exons. According to GeneCard, the TEX55 mRNA has 3 theoretical splice forms, but only the one containing all three exons have been studied and characterized. The 5’ UTR of the mRNA has an RFX1 binding site, which binds to a stem-loop structure just upstream of the start codon, used to activate transcription.

== Protein ==
The translated protein of the TEX 55 mRNA is 536 AA, a predicted molecular weight of 60 kD, had an isoelectric point of 5.51, and is highly conserved at the C-terminus. Tex55 has a slightly high amount of Glutamine and a slightly low amount of Leucine, which compared to the protein database swp23s.q. Multiple sequence alignment of TEX55 and 20 mammalian orthologs show that there are 28 residues, concentrated in the C-terminus, that are conserved between all proteins. The highly conserved residues are outlined in the conceptual translation and multiple sequence analysis. Through function-region analysis, researchers found that this protein may act as an anchoring protein of cAMP-dependent type-II PK, and might be an A-kinase anchoring proteins.

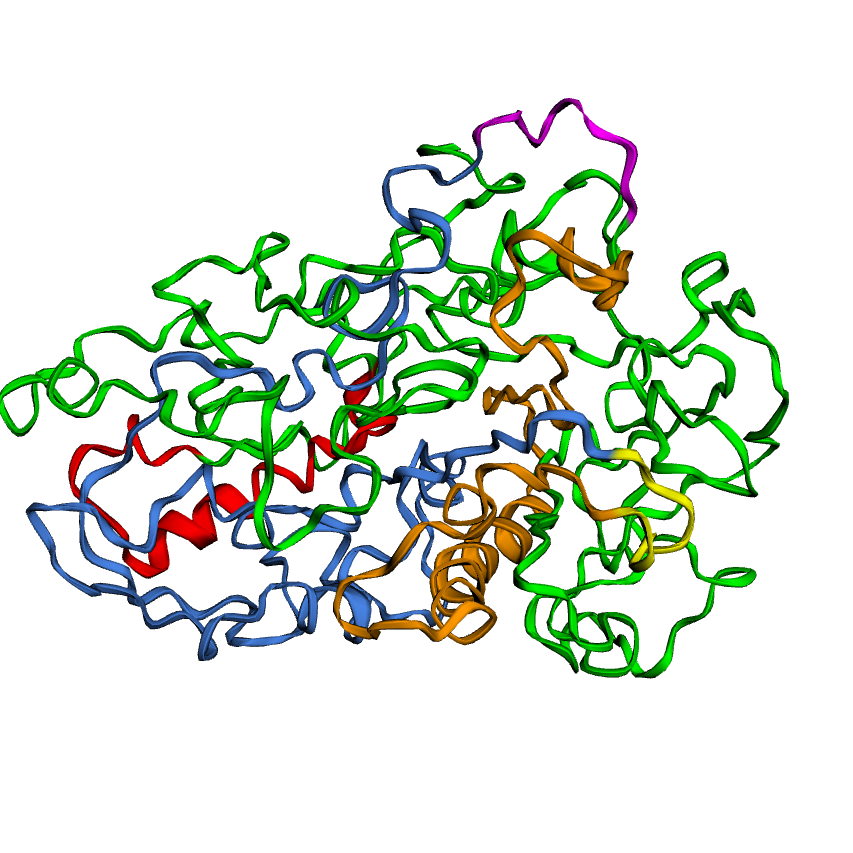
Rendering of the TEX55 protein. Motifs are color coded in the following manner. Purple: NLS, blue: EF-Hand Calcium Binding Domain 10, orange: Uroplakin 1B motif, yellow: overlap between homologous domains, red: high-confidence alpha-helix.

Cartoon model of the TEX55 protein Red flags indicate potential phosphorylation/O-glycosylation sites. The gray flag represents the sumoylation site of TEX55. The two homologous domains and the high-confidence alpha-helix are shown in the blue pentagon and orance hexagon, respectively.

=== Post-Translational Modifications ===
Analysis of the sumoylation sites indicate that Lys 14 has a high probability of being sumoylated. The TEX55 protein has a high number of potential phosphorylation/O-glycosylation sites.

=== Secondary Structure ===
All secondary structure prediction analysis indicate that the C-terminus of Tex 55 has a high probability of being an alpha-helix, and indicate that there is little to no amount of beta-sheets. Secondary structure analysis tools predict that the majority of the Tex 55 protein is coiled domains, and alpha-helices.

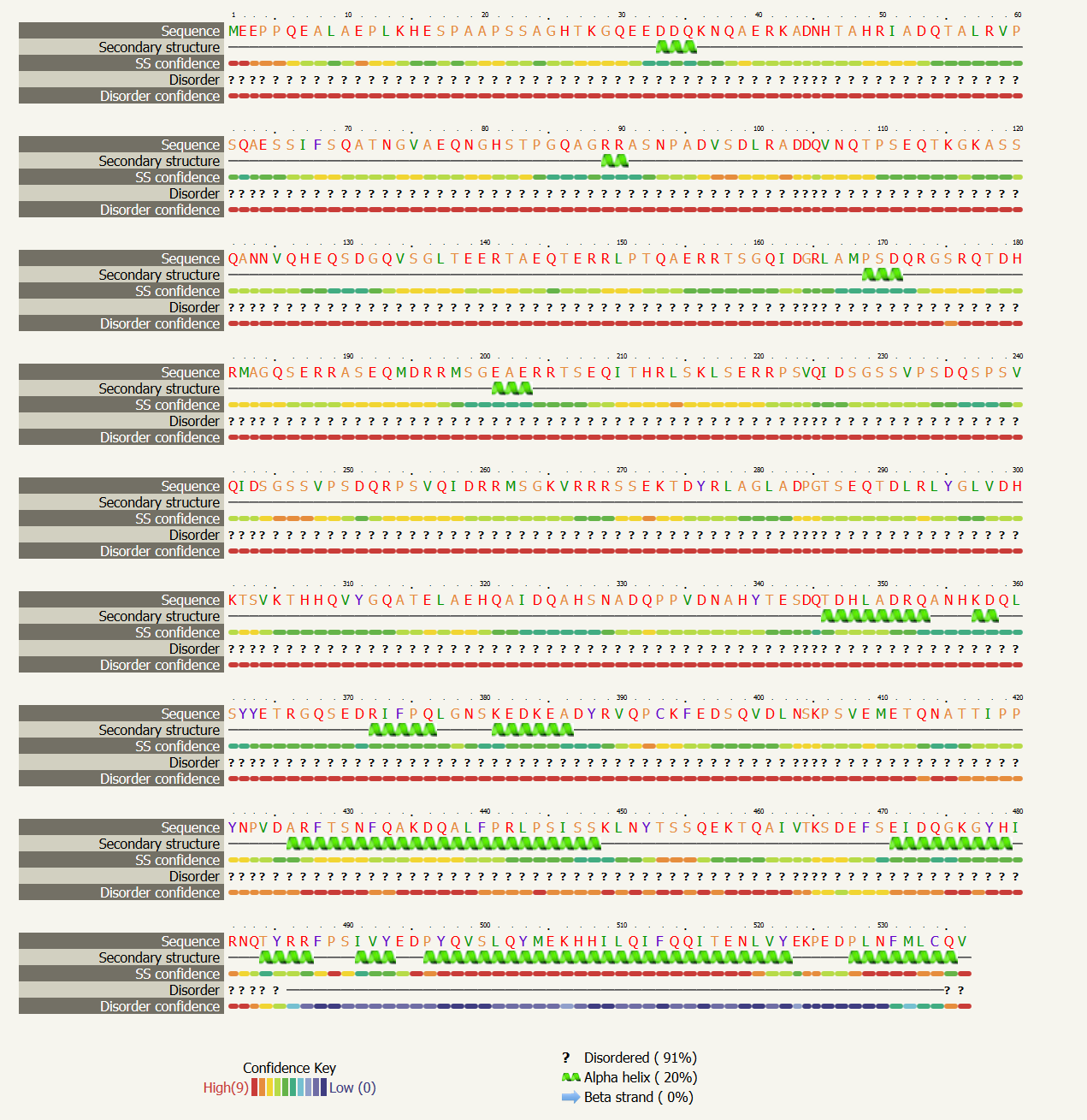
Secondary structure of the TEX55 protein. The secondary structure of TEX55 is mainly alpha-helices and coiled domains.

=== Tertiary Structure ===
Tertiary structures of TEX55 was generated using Phyre2. The C-terminus, which is highly conserved, was calculated to have a 30 residue alpha-helix that has relatively high confidence (82.3%). The highly conserved, high-confidence, alpha-helix is colored in red in the 3D structure image of TEX55 to the above. The overall tertiary structure of TEX55 is globular.

=== Motifs ===
Tex55 has two motifs according to GeneCard: EF-Hand Calcium Binding Domain 10 and Uroplakin 1B, both of which are found in the middle of the protein. Uroplakin 1B is known to regulate cell development, activation, growth, and motility. This could indicate why abnormalities in TEX55 expression leads to sperm with altered morphology.

=== Protein Localization ===
Analysis the cellular localization probability of Tex55 and its orthologs indicate that it is most likely located in the nucleus of the cell. Below is a list of orthologs and the probability of finding that protein in the specified cellular location.

Cellular Localization Probability of TEX55 and Orthologs
Organism	Nucleus	Cytoplasm	Cytoskeletal	Golgi	Mitochondria	Plasma Membrane
Human	43.5%	34.8%	13.0%	0%	8.7%	0%
Vampire Bat	60.9%	17.4%	13.0%	4.3%	0%	4.3%
Tree Shrew	82.6%	17.4%	0%	0%	8.7%	0%
Cat	73.9%	17.4%	0%	0%	8.7%	0%
Southern White Rhino	65.2%	17.4%	4.3%	0%	8.7%	4.3%
Lemur	56.5%	30.4%	13.0%	0%	0%	0%
Beluga Whale	52.2%	26.1%	13.0%	0%	4.3%	4.3%

== Expression ==
Expression of TEX55 mRNA can be found in most tissues in the human body, from the brain to the prostate. However, the protein produced by this mRNA has been shown to be produced mainly in the testis of mammals, according to NCBI. Analysis done by the Human Protein Atlas indicates that the TEX55 protein can be found not only in the testis, but also the bronchus, fallopian tubes, and endometrium.

== Clinical significance ==
Being produced mainly in the testis of mammals, researchers believe that the protein product of TEX55 plays a role in spermatogenesis. It has been shown that individuals with Cryptorchidism and Sertoli-cell-only syndrome, which are both associated with sterility, do not produce this protein in their testis. Microarray analysis of individuals with Teratozoospermia, a condition that is characterized by ~96% of sperm morphology being altered, indicates that TEX55 expression is reduced by ~20%. In clinical research, the TEX55 protein products have been detected in mice starting at 38 days old, then up regulated for at least 6 month.

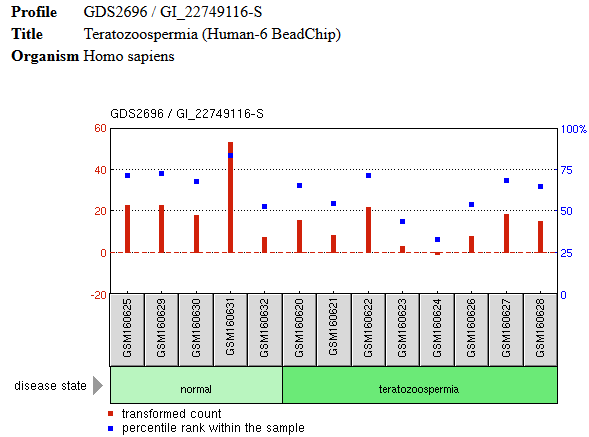
Microarray expression analysis of TEX55 in patients with Teratzoospermia.
