= UPK3B =

Gene of the species Homo sapiens

Identifiers
- Aliases: UPK3B, LOC105375355, Uroplakin 3B
- External IDs: OMIM: 611887; GeneCards: UPK3B
Orthologs
Databases	NCBI: entry
Species	Human	Mouse
Entrez	105375355	n/a
Ensembl	n/a	n/a
UniProt	Q9BT76	n/a
RefSeq (mRNA)	n/a	n/a
RefSeq (protein)	NP_001334613; NP_085047; NP_872624; NP_872625	n/a
Location (UCSC)	n/a	n/a
PubMed search		n/a
- Wikidata
View/Edit Human

Uroplakin 3B is a protein that in humans is encoded by the UPK3B gene.

== Function ==
UPK3B is a minor component of the apical plaques of mammalian urothelium that binds and dimerizes with uroplakin-1b (UPK1B; MIM 602380), one of the major conserved urothelium membrane proteins.

The other major conserved integral membrane proteins of urothelial plaques are UPK1A (MIM 611557), UPK2 (MIM 611558), and UPK3A (MIM 611559) (Deng et al., 2002 [PubMed 12446744]).[supplied by OMIM, Mar 2008].
