= TSP-2 =

TSP-2 can refer to:

- a Thrombospondin
- a tetraspanin
