= TM4SF1 =

Protein-coding gene in the species Homo sapiens

Identifiers
- Aliases: TM4SF1, H-L6, L6, M3S1, TAAL6, transmembrane 4 L six family member 1
- External IDs: OMIM: 191155; MGI: 104678; GeneCards: TM4SF1

Gene location (Human)
Chr.	Chromosome 3 (human)
Band	3q25.1	Start	149,369,022 bp
Band	3q25.1	End	149,377,692 bp

Gene location (Mouse)
Chr.	Chromosome 3 (mouse)
Band	3|3 D	Start	57,193,032 bp
Band	3|3 D	End	57,209,409 bp
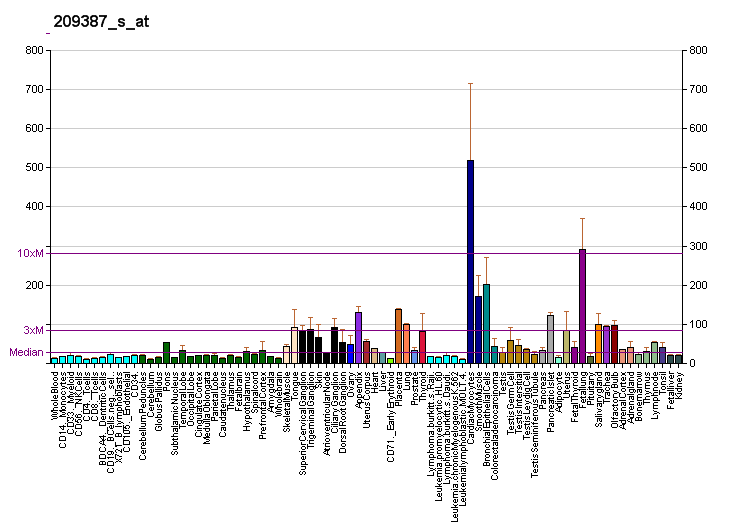

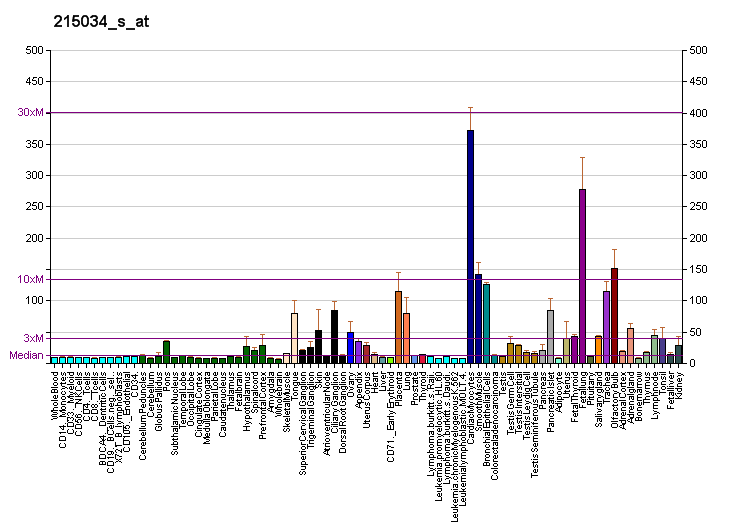

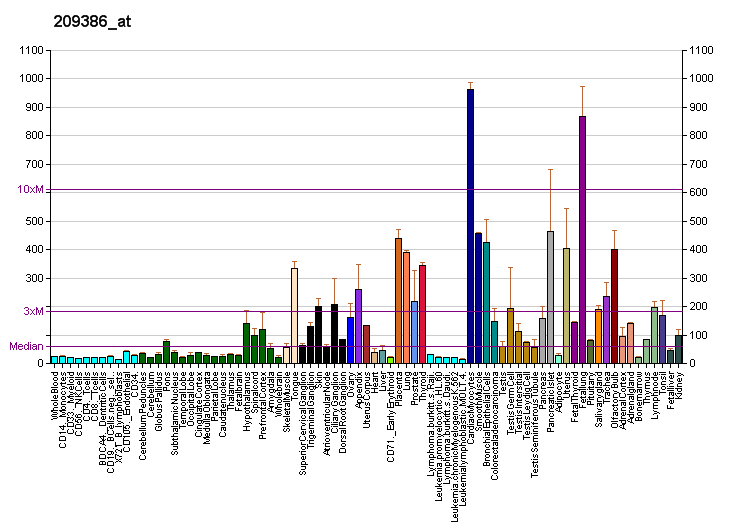
RNA expression pattern
Bgee	Human / Mouse (ortholog); Top expressed in: vena cava; parietal pleura; cartilage tissue; visceral pleura; germinal epithelium; epithelium of lactiferous gland; lactiferous duct; pericardium; islet of Langerhans; lower lobe of lung / Top expressed in: tunica media of zone of aorta; endothelial cell of lymphatic vessel; right lung lobe; carotid body; atrioventricular valve; semi-lunar valve; aortic valve; ascending aorta; endocardial cushion; left lung; More reference expression data
BioGPS	More reference expression data
Gene ontology
Molecular function	protein binding; molecular function
Cellular component	integral component of plasma membrane; membrane; integral component of membrane
Biological process	biological process; blastocyst formation
Sources:Amigo / QuickGO
Orthologs
Databases	NCBI: entry; OMA: entry
Species	Human	Mouse
Entrez	4071	17112
Ensembl	ENSG00000169908	ENSMUSG00000027800
UniProt	P30408	Q64302
RefSeq (mRNA)	NM_014220	NM_008536; NM_001355130
RefSeq (protein)	NP_055035	NP_032562; NP_001342059
Location (UCSC)	Chr 3: 149.37 – 149.38 Mb	Chr 3: 57.19 – 57.21 Mb
PubMed search
- Wikidata
View/Edit Human	View/Edit Mouse

Transmembrane 4 L6 family member 1 is a protein that in humans is encoded by the TM4SF1 gene.

== Function ==
The protein encoded by this gene is a member of the transmembrane 4 superfamily, also known as the tetraspanin family. Most of these members are cell-surface proteins that are characterized by the presence of four hydrophobic domains. The proteins mediate signal transduction events that play a role in the regulation of cell development, activation, growth and motility. This encoded protein is a cell surface antigen and is highly expressed in different carcinomas.

== Marker gene for alveolar epithelial progenitors ==
TM4SF1 has been identified as a marker of Wnt-responsive alveolar epithelial progenitor cells, and a marker of alveolar repair in injured regions of the lungs. It has also been found hypomethylated and upregulated in asthma, with potential prognostic value (AUROC: 0.769).
