= TSPAN3 =

Protein-coding gene in humans

Identifiers
- Aliases: TSPAN3, TM4-A, TM4SF8, TSPAN-3, tetraspanin 3
- External IDs: OMIM: 613134; MGI: 1928098; GeneCards: TSPAN3

Gene location (Human)
Chr.	Chromosome 15 (human)
Band	15q24.3	Start	77,041,404 bp
Band	15q24.3	End	77,083,984 bp

Gene location (Mouse)
Chr.	Chromosome 9 (mouse)
Band	9|9 B	Start	56,039,009 bp
Band	9|9 B	End	56,072,761 bp
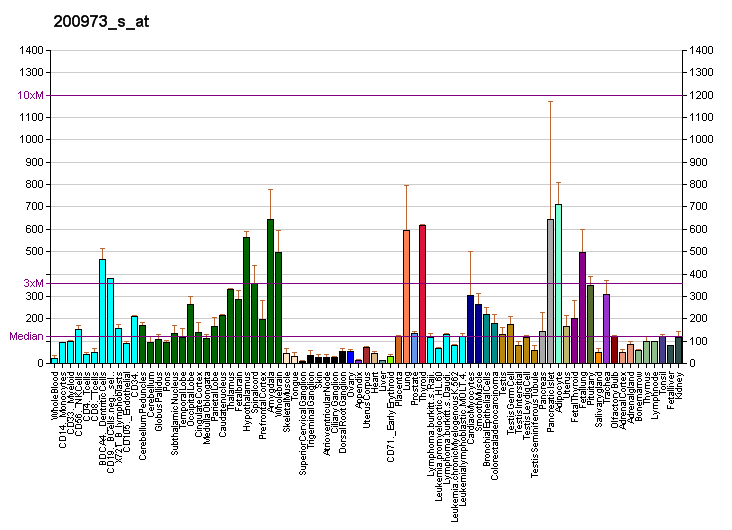

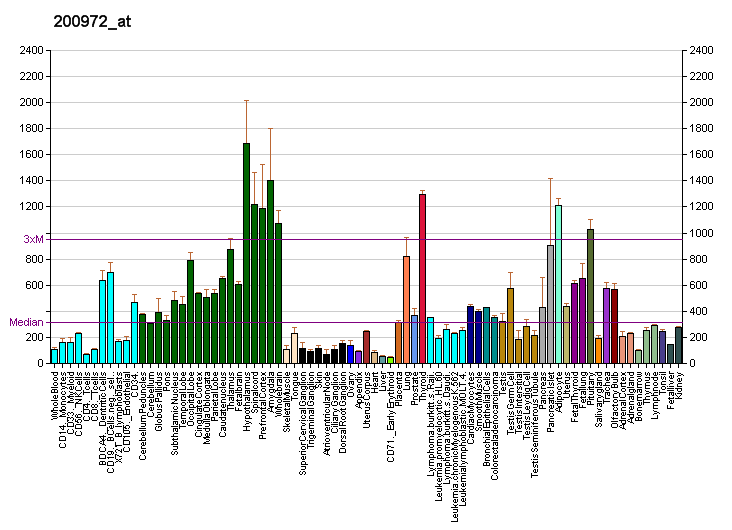
RNA expression pattern
Bgee	Human / Mouse (ortholog); Top expressed in: bronchial epithelial cell; mucosa of sigmoid colon; ventricular zone; rectum; corpus epididymis; beta cell; caput epididymis; palpebral conjunctiva; right uterine tube; external globus pallidus / Top expressed in: vestibular sensory epithelium; Epithelium of choroid plexus; nucleus of stria terminalis; central gray substance of midbrain; ventral tegmental area; right kidney; left colon; saccule; dorsomedial hypothalamic nucleus; superior colliculus; More reference expression data
BioGPS	More reference expression data
Gene ontology
Molecular function	molecular function
Cellular component	integral component of membrane; integral component of plasma membrane; extracellular exosome; membrane
Biological process	cell surface receptor signaling pathway; biological process
Sources:Amigo / QuickGO
Orthologs
Databases	NCBI: entry; OMA: entry
Species	Human	Mouse
Entrez	10099	56434
Ensembl	ENSG00000140391	ENSMUSG00000032324
UniProt	O60637	Q9QY33
RefSeq (mRNA)	NM_198902; NM_001168412; NM_005724	NM_019793
RefSeq (protein)	NP_001161884; NP_005715; NP_944492	NP_062767
Location (UCSC)	Chr 15: 77.04 – 77.08 Mb	Chr 9: 56.04 – 56.07 Mb
PubMed search
- Wikidata
View/Edit Human	View/Edit Mouse

Tetraspanin-3 is a protein that in humans is encoded by the TSPAN3 gene.

The protein encoded by this gene is a member of the transmembrane 4 superfamily, also known as the tetraspanin family. Most of these members are cell-surface proteins that are characterized by the presence of four hydrophobic domains.

The proteins mediate signal transduction events that play a role in the regulation of cell development, activation, growth and motility. The use of alternate polyadenylation sites has been found for this gene. Two alternative transcripts encoding different isoforms have been described.
