= Integrin alpha 3 =

Mammalian protein found in Homo sapiens

ITGA3

Identifiers
- Aliases: ITGA3, CD49C, GAP-B3, GAPB3, ILNEB, MSK18, VCA-2, VL3A, VLA3a, FRP-2, integrin subunit alpha 3, JEB7
- External IDs: OMIM: 605025; MGI: 96602; GeneCards: ITGA3

Gene location (Human)
Chr.	Chromosome 17 (human)
Band	17q21.33	Start	50,055,968 bp
Band	17q21.33	End	50,090,481 bp

Gene location (Mouse)
Chr.	Chromosome 11 (mouse)
Band	11 D|11 59.01 cM	Start	94,935,300 bp
Band	11 D|11 59.01 cM	End	94,967,627 bp
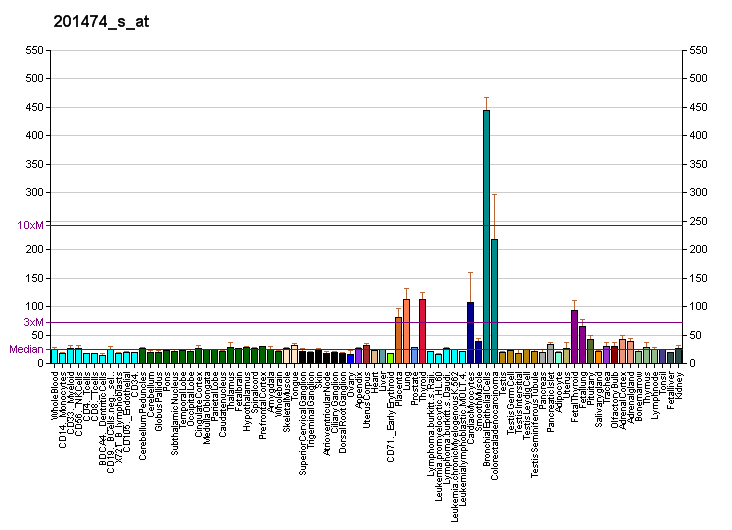
RNA expression pattern
Bgee	Human / Mouse (ortholog); Top expressed in: metanephric glomerulus; right coronary artery; upper lobe of left lung; Descending thoracic aorta; popliteal artery; tibial arteries; right lung; right lobe of thyroid gland; ascending aorta; left lobe of thyroid gland / Top expressed in: genital tubercle; lumbar spinal ganglion; decidua; tail of embryo; corneal stroma; yolk sac; crypt of lieberkuhn of small intestine; right lung lobe; epithelium of lens; ileum; More reference expression data
BioGPS	More reference expression data
Gene ontology
Molecular function	metal ion binding; protein domain specific binding; laminin binding; collagen binding; protease binding; protein heterodimerization activity; integrin binding; fibronectin binding; protein binding
Cellular component	extracellular exosome; synapse; integral component of membrane; cell projection; cell periphery; cell junction; growth cone; membrane; focal adhesion; cell surface; receptor complex; synaptic membrane; perinuclear region of cytoplasm; excitatory synapse; integrin complex; basolateral plasma membrane; filopodium membrane; external side of plasma membrane; integrin alpha3-beta1 complex; plasma membrane; growth cone filopodium
Biological process	positive regulation of neuron projection development; extracellular matrix organization; lung development; mesodermal cell differentiation; skin development; maternal process involved in female pregnancy; cell-matrix adhesion; negative regulation of cell projection organization; positive regulation of cell-substrate adhesion; development of the heart; dendritic spine maintenance; positive regulation of gene expression; nephron development; memory; integrin-mediated signaling pathway; response to gonadotropin; leukocyte migration; renal filtration; regulation of transforming growth factor beta receptor signaling pathway; regulation of Wnt signaling pathway; regulation of BMP signaling pathway; negative regulation of Rho protein signal transduction; exploration behavior; positive regulation of epithelial cell migration; neuron migration; cell adhesion; positive regulation of protein localization to plasma membrane
Sources:Amigo / QuickGO
Orthologs
Databases	NCBI: entry; OMA: entry
Species	Human	Mouse
Entrez	3675	16400
Ensembl	ENSG00000005884	ENSMUSG00000001507
UniProt	P26006	Q62470
RefSeq (mRNA)	NM_002204; NM_005501	NM_013565; NM_001306071; NM_001306162
RefSeq (protein)	NP_002195	NP_001293000; NP_001293091; NP_038593
Location (UCSC)	Chr 17: 50.06 – 50.09 Mb	Chr 11: 94.94 – 94.97 Mb
PubMed search
- Wikidata
View/Edit Human	View/Edit Mouse

Integrin alpha-3 is a protein that in humans is encoded by the ITGA3 gene. ITGA3 is an integrin alpha subunit. Together with beta-1 subunit, it makes up half of the α3β1 integrin duplex that plays a role in neural migration and corticogenesis, acted upon by such factors as netrin-1 and reelin.

ITGA3 encodes the integrin alpha 3 chain. Integrins are heterodimeric integral membrane proteins composed of an alpha chain and a beta chain. Alpha chain 3 undergoes post-translational cleavage in the extracellular domain to yield disulfide-linked light and heavy chains that join with beta 1 to form an integrin that interacts with many extracellular matrix proteins.

== Alternative names ==
The alpha 3 beta 1 integrin is known variously as: very late (activation) antigen 3 ('VLA-3'), very common antigen 2 ('VCA-2'), extracellular matrix receptor 1 ('ECMR1'), and galactoprotein b3 ('GAPB3').

== Interactions ==
CD49c has been shown to interact with:

- CD9
- FHL2,
- LGALS8, and
- TSPAN4.
