= Measles virus encoding the human thyroidal sodium iodide symporter =

Measles virus encoding the human thyroidal sodium iodide symporter or MV-NIS is an attenuated oncolytic Edmonston (Ed) strain of measles virus.

MV-NIS will attach and fuse to host tumor cell membranes. After fusion, MV-NIS has been observed to kill the tumor cells. Due to the unique properties of iodine uptake in these cells, iodine 123 (I-123) may be used to image MV-NIS-infected tumor cells. Non-invasive imaging provides confirmation of targeted infection and allows for monitoring and visualization of treatment progression.

The human CD46 antigen is known to be the functional cellular receptor for Measles virus. This type 1 integral membrane glycoprotein is a normal part of human tissue but may be overexpressed on some cancer cell types.

MV-NIS is the first targeted engineered virus therapy to have shown remission in published cancer clinical trials.

== PET/CT imaging ==
A few days after infection, the host animal may be injected with radioiodine which is then selectively captured by infected cells and tumors. Detailed images may then be created showing the location of these infections and the target sites for tumor reduction monitoring.

In the mouse model, non-invasive imaging and selective uptake have assisted in evidence for selective prostate cancer treatment.

This imaging technique is an improvement over initial efforts to engineer a measles virus to carry the soluble marker human carcinoembryonic antigen (CEA). The resultant strain, MV-CEA, could only be monitored by blood test which is not specific to areas of treatment.

== See also ==
- Virotherapy
- Oncolytic virus
