= TSPAN32 =

Protein-coding gene in humans

Identifiers
- Aliases: TSPAN32, ART1, PHEMX, PHMX, TSSC6, tetraspanin 32
- External IDs: OMIM: 603853; MGI: 1350360; GeneCards: TSPAN32

Gene location (Human)
Chr.	Chromosome 11 (human)
Band	11p15.5	Start	2,301,997 bp
Band	11p15.5	End	2,318,204 bp

Gene location (Mouse)
Chr.	Chromosome 7 (mouse)
Band	7 F5|7 88.09 cM	Start	142,558,783 bp
Band	7 F5|7 88.09 cM	End	142,573,381 bp
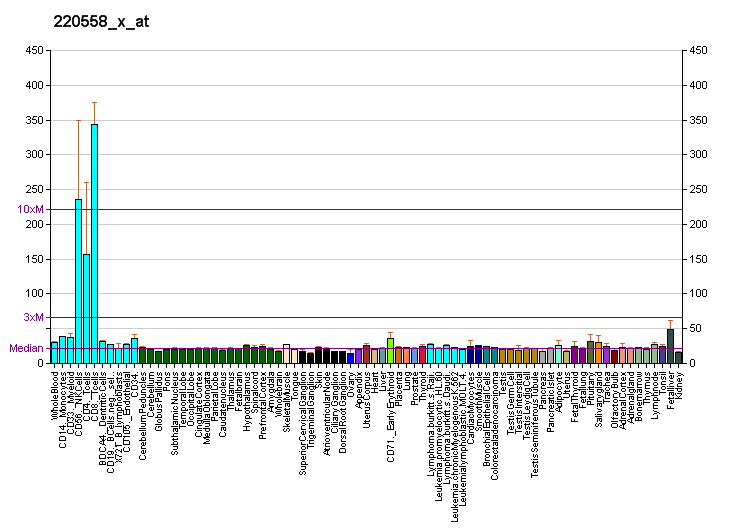
RNA expression pattern
Bgee	Human / Mouse (ortholog); Top expressed in: granulocyte; apex of heart; monocyte; blood; spleen; bone marrow cell; left ventricle; right auricle of heart; lymph node; trabecular bone / Top expressed in: granulocyte; blood; mesenteric lymph nodes; spleen; fetal liver hematopoietic progenitor cell; thymus; embryo; bone marrow; tibiofemoral joint; yolk sac; More reference expression data
BioGPS	More reference expression data
Gene ontology
Molecular function	molecular function
Cellular component	integral component of membrane; cell surface; integrin alphaIIb-beta3 complex; integral component of plasma membrane; intracellular anatomical structure; membrane
Biological process	hemostasis; integrin-mediated signaling pathway; negative regulation of myeloid dendritic cell activation; cell-cell signaling; cell surface receptor signaling pathway; regulation of defense response to virus; platelet aggregation; blood coagulation; cytoskeleton organization; negative regulation of cell population proliferation; defense response to protozoan
Sources:Amigo / QuickGO
Orthologs
Databases	NCBI: entry; OMA: entry
Species	Human	Mouse
Entrez	10077	27027
Ensembl	ENSG00000064201	ENSMUSG00000000244
UniProt	Q96QS1	Q9JHH2
RefSeq (mRNA)	NM_005705; NM_139022; NM_139024	NM_001128080; NM_001128081; NM_001128082; NM_020286
RefSeq (protein)	NP_620591	NP_001121552; NP_001121553; NP_001121554; NP_064682
Location (UCSC)	Chr 11: 2.3 – 2.32 Mb	Chr 7: 142.56 – 142.57 Mb
PubMed search
- Wikidata
View/Edit Human	View/Edit Mouse

Tetraspanin-32 is a protein that in humans is encoded by the TSPAN32 gene.

== Function ==
This gene is described as a member of the tetraspanin superfamily whose expression is confined to hematopoietic tissues.

== Clinical significance ==
This gene is one of several tumor-suppressing subtransferable fragments located in the imprinted gene domain of 11p15.5, an important tumor suppressor gene region. Alterations in this region have been associated with the Beckwith-Wiedemann syndrome, Wilms tumor, rhabdomyosarcoma, adrenocortical carcinoma, and lung, ovarian, and breast cancer. This gene is located among several imprinted genes; however, this gene, as well as the tumor-suppressing subchromosomal transferable fragment 4 (TSSC4), escapes imprinting. This gene may play a role in malignancies and disease that involve this region as well as hematopoietic cell function.
