= Tetraspanin 10 =

Protein-coding gene in humans

TSPAN10

Identifiers
- Aliases: TSPAN10, OCSP, tetraspanin 10
- External IDs: MGI: 2384781; GeneCards: TSPAN10

Gene location (Human)
Chr.	Chromosome 17 (human)
Band	17q25.3	Start	81,637,171 bp
Band	17q25.3	End	81,648,754 bp

Gene location (Mouse)
Chr.	Chromosome 11 (mouse)
Band	11|11 E2	Start	120,333,470 bp
Band	11|11 E2	End	120,337,776 bp
RNA expression pattern
Bgee	Human / Mouse (ortholog); Top expressed in: retinal pigment epithelium; gingival epithelium; testicle; buccal mucosa cell; vulva; amniotic fluid; oocyte; human penis; corpus epididymis; stromal cell of endometrium / Top expressed in: iris; ciliary body; retinal pigment epithelium; embryo; morula; stria vascularis; yolk sac; blastocyst; thymus; hair follicle; More reference expression data
BioGPS	n/a
Gene ontology
Molecular function	enzyme binding
Cellular component	integral component of membrane; integral component of plasma membrane; membrane
Biological process	cell surface receptor signaling pathway; establishment of protein localization to organelle; protein maturation
Sources:Amigo / QuickGO
Orthologs
Databases	NCBI: entry; OMA: entry
Species	Human	Mouse
Entrez	83882	208634
Ensembl	ENSG00000182612	ENSMUSG00000039691
UniProt	Q9H1Z9	Q8VCF5
RefSeq (mRNA)	NM_001290212; NM_031945	NM_145363
RefSeq (protein)	NP_001277141; NP_114151	NP_663338.2
Location (UCSC)	Chr 17: 81.64 – 81.65 Mb	Chr 11: 120.33 – 120.34 Mb
PubMed search
- Wikidata
View/Edit Human	View/Edit Mouse

Tetraspanin 10 is a protein that in humans is encoded by the TSPAN10 gene.

Tetraspanin 10 is part of the TspanC8 family of tetraspanins, whose functions are, generally, cell migration, protein trafficking, maintenance of membrane integrity, and regulation of signal transduction between cells.
