= TSPAN6 =

Protein-coding gene in humans

Identifiers
- Aliases: TSPAN6, T245, TM4SF6, TSPAN-6, tetraspanin 6
- External IDs: OMIM: 300191; MGI: 1926264; GeneCards: TSPAN6

Gene location (Human)
Chr.	X chromosome (human)
Band	Xq22.1	Start	100,627,108 bp
Band	Xq22.1	End	100,639,991 bp

Gene location (Mouse)
Chr.	X chromosome (mouse)
Band	X|X E3	Start	132,791,817 bp
Band	X|X E3	End	132,799,178 bp
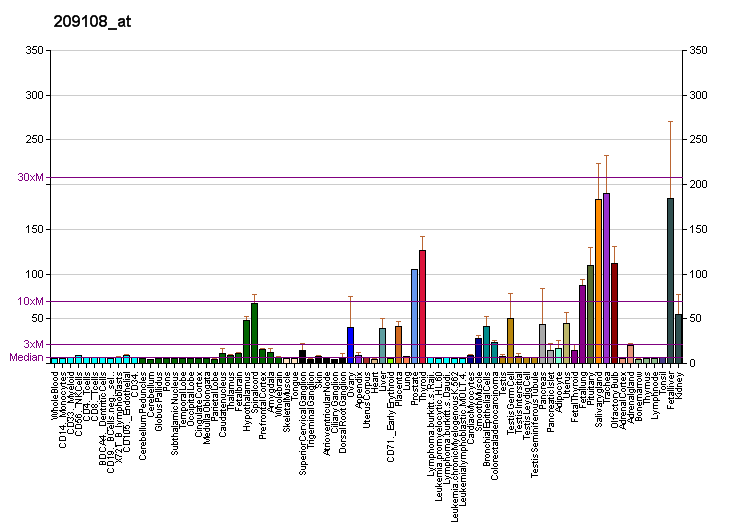

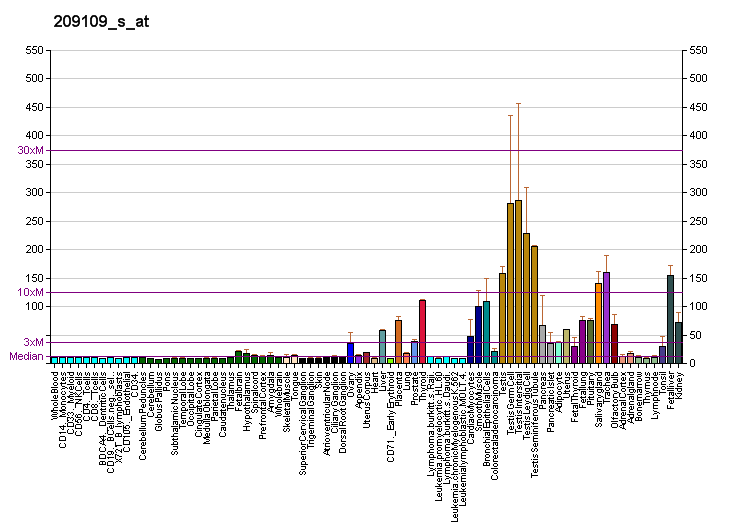
RNA expression pattern
Bgee	Human / Mouse (ortholog); Top expressed in: sperm; parotid gland; bronchial epithelial cell; nasal epithelium; epithelium of nasopharynx; tibia; mucosa of paranasal sinus; olfactory zone of nasal mucosa; mucosa of colon; mucosa of sigmoid colon / Top expressed in: saccule; transitional epithelium of urinary bladder; otic placode; otic vesicle; endocardial cushion; atrioventricular valve; medial ganglionic eminence; molar; abdominal wall; neural tube; More reference expression data
BioGPS	More reference expression data
Gene ontology
Molecular function	protein binding; signal transducer activity
Cellular component	integral component of membrane; integral component of plasma membrane; extracellular exosome; membrane
Biological process	positive regulation of I-kappaB kinase/NF-kappaB signaling; negative regulation of NIK/NF-kappaB signaling; cell surface receptor signaling pathway; negative regulation of viral-induced cytoplasmic pattern recognition receptor signaling pathway
Sources:Amigo / QuickGO
Orthologs
Databases	NCBI: entry; OMA: entry
Species	Human	Mouse
Entrez	7105	56496
Ensembl	ENSG00000000003	ENSMUSG00000067377
UniProt	O43657	O70401
RefSeq (mRNA)	NM_001278740; NM_001278741; NM_001278742; NM_001278743; NM_003270	NM_019656
RefSeq (protein)	NP_001265669; NP_001265670; NP_001265671; NP_001265672; NP_003261	n/a
Location (UCSC)	Chr X: 100.63 – 100.64 Mb	Chr X: 132.79 – 132.8 Mb
PubMed search
- Wikidata
View/Edit Human	View/Edit Mouse

Tetraspanin-6 is a protein that in humans is encoded by the TSPAN6 gene.

The protein encoded by this gene is a member of the transmembrane 4 superfamily, also known as the tetraspanin family. Most of these members are cell-surface proteins characterized by the presence of four hydrophobic domains. The proteins mediate signal transduction events that play a role in the regulation of cell development, activation, growth and motility. This encoded protein is a cell surface glycoprotein and is highly similar in sequence to the transmembrane 4 superfamily member 2. The use of alternate polyadenylation sites has been found for this gene.
