= TSPAN12 =

Protein-coding gene in humans

Identifiers
- Aliases: TSPAN12, EVR5, NET-2, NET2, TM4SF12, tetraspanin 12
- External IDs: OMIM: 613138; MGI: 1889818; GeneCards: TSPAN12

Gene location (Human)
Chr.	Chromosome 7 (human)
Band	7q31.31	Start	120,787,320 bp
Band	7q31.31	End	120,858,402 bp

Gene location (Mouse)
Chr.	Chromosome 6 (mouse)
Band	6|6 A3.1	Start	21,771,394 bp
Band	6|6 A3.1	End	21,852,514 bp
RNA expression pattern
Bgee	Human / Mouse (ortholog); Top expressed in: oocyte; kidney tubule; secondary oocyte; right adrenal gland; right ventricle; lower lobe of lung; jejunal mucosa; glomerulus; metanephric glomerulus; left adrenal gland / Top expressed in: brown adipose tissue; parotid gland; submandibular gland; tunica adventitia of aorta; white adipose tissue; intercostal muscle; female external genitalia; liver; adrenal gland; mucosa of urinary bladder; More reference expression data
BioGPS	n/a
Gene ontology
Molecular function	protein binding; Wnt-activated receptor activity
Cellular component	membrane; plasma membrane; integral component of membrane; integral component of plasma membrane
Biological process	angiogenesis; retina layer formation; regulation of angiogenesis; cell surface receptor signaling pathway; Wnt signaling pathway
Sources:Amigo / QuickGO
Orthologs
Databases	NCBI: entry; OMA: entry
Species	Human	Mouse
Entrez	23554	269831
Ensembl	ENSG00000106025	ENSMUSG00000029669
UniProt	O95859	Q8BKT6
RefSeq (mRNA)	NM_012338	NM_173007; NM_001363814
RefSeq (protein)	NP_036470	NP_766595; NP_001350743
Location (UCSC)	Chr 7: 120.79 – 120.86 Mb	Chr 6: 21.77 – 21.85 Mb
PubMed search
- Wikidata
View/Edit Human	View/Edit Mouse

Tetraspanin-12 (Tspan-12) also known as tetraspan NET-2 (NET2) or transmembrane 4 superfamily member 12 (TM4SF12) is a tetraspanin protein that in humans is encoded by the TSPAN12 gene. Tetraspanin-12 is found in the membrane of a variety of cells. It has an unusually long C-terminal intracellular tail of approximately 60 amino acids.

== Function ==
Its main binding partner is the ADAM10 protein, a sheddase that interacts with a variety of adhesion molecules that are found on the cell membrane including L1-CAM, E-Cadherin, N-Cadherin and CD44. It also binds to the MT1-MMP metalloprotease protein that is closely related to ADAM10 but has a minimal effect on promotion of expression and function. TSPAN12 also seems to regulate vascular development, as shown by a study involving TSPAN12 knockout mice. TSPAN12 is a significant contributor to primary and metastatic cancer and is responsible for protecting β-catenin from degradation.
