= Membrane cofactor protein =

Mammalian protein found in humans

CD46

Identifiers
- Aliases: CD46, AHUS2, MCP, MIC10, TLX, TRA2.10, CD46 molecule
- External IDs: OMIM: 120920; MGI: 1203290; GeneCards: CD46
Available structures
| PDB | Ortholog search: PDBe RCSB |
| PDB | List of PDB id codes 3O8E, 1CKL, 2O39, 3INB, 3L89, 5FO8 |

Gene location (Human)
| Chr. | Chromosome 1 (human) |
| Band | 1q32.2 | Start | 207,752,037 bp |
| Band | 1q32.2 | End | 207,795,513 bp |

Gene location (Mouse)
| Chr. | Chromosome 1 (mouse) |
| Band | 1 H6|1 98.41 cM | Start | 194,719,134 bp |
| Band | 1 H6|1 98.41 cM | End | 194,774,557 bp |
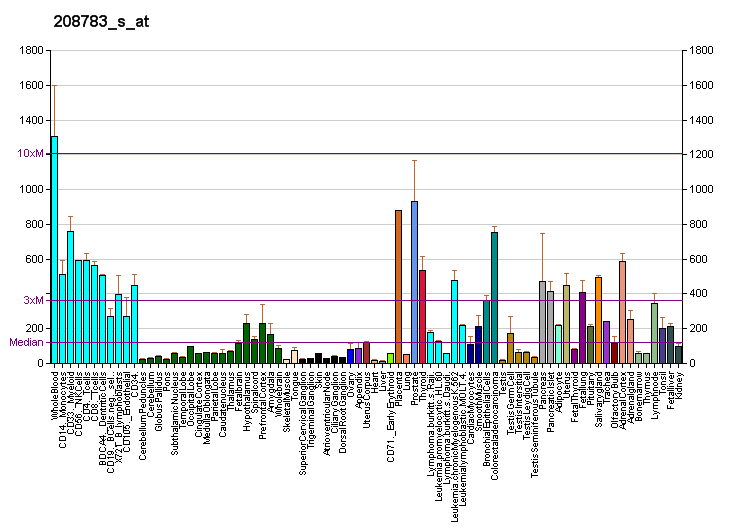

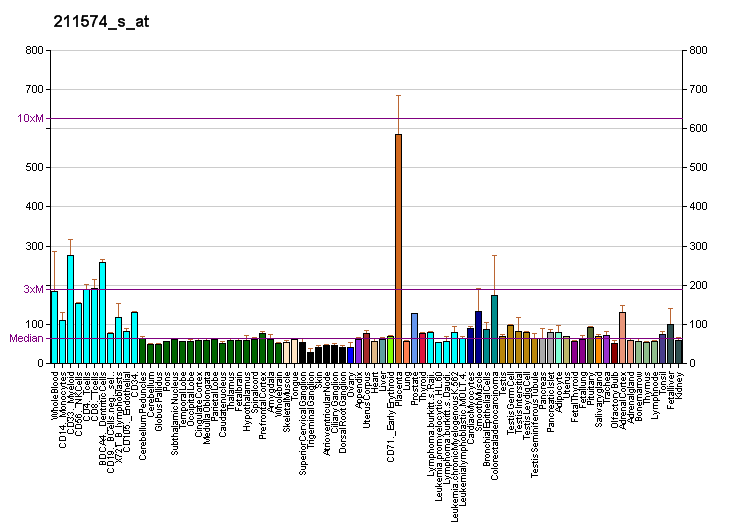

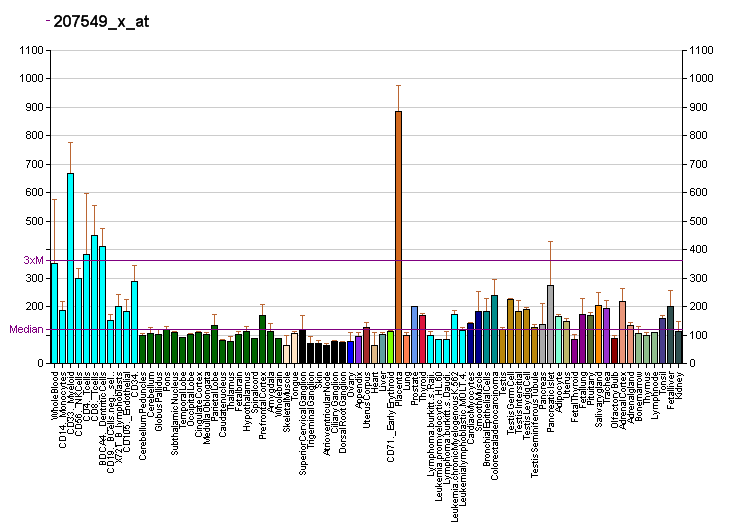
RNA expression pattern
| Bgee | Human / Mouse (ortholog); Top expressed in: palpebral conjunctiva; seminal vesicula; bronchial epithelial cell; jejunal mucosa; germinal epithelium; parotid gland; placenta; right uterine tube; right lung; body of pancreas / Top expressed in: seminiferous tubule; spermatid; granulocyte; vastus lateralis muscle; intestinal villus; primary visual cortex; lumbar subsegment of spinal cord; muscle of thigh; ventricular zone; embryo; More reference expression data |
| BioGPS | More reference expression data |
Gene ontology
| Molecular function | virus receptor activity; cadherin binding; protein binding; complement binding; endopeptidase activity; enzyme inhibitor activity; signaling receptor activity |
| Cellular component | integral component of membrane; inner acrosomal membrane; membrane; focal adhesion; plasma membrane; integral component of plasma membrane; cell surface; extracellular exosome; cytoplasmic vesicle; acrosomal vesicle; cytoplasm; Golgi apparatus; basolateral plasma membrane |
| Biological process | T cell mediated immunity; adaptive immune response; positive regulation of interleukin-10 production; immune system process; sequestering of extracellular ligand from receptor; positive regulation of regulatory T cell differentiation; negative regulation of gene expression; single fertilization; positive regulation of gene expression; positive regulation of T cell proliferation; positive regulation of memory T cell differentiation; complement activation, classical pathway; positive regulation of transforming growth factor beta production; viral entry into host cell; viral process; regulation of Notch signaling pathway; regulation of complement activation; interleukin-10 production; innate immune response; proteolysis; negative regulation of catalytic activity; negative regulation of complement activation |
Sources:Amigo / QuickGO
Orthologs
| Databases | NCBI: entry; OMA: entry |
| Species | Human | Mouse |
| Entrez | 4179 | 17221 |
| Ensembl | ENSG00000117335 | ENSMUSG00000016493 |
| UniProt | P15529 | O88174 |
| RefSeq (mRNA) | NM_002389; NM_153826; NM_172350; NM_172351; NM_172352 NM_172353; NM_172354; NM_172355; NM_172356; NM_172357; NM_172358; NM_172359; NM_172360; NM_172361 | NM_010778 |
| RefSeq (protein) | NP_002380; NP_722548; NP_758860; NP_758861; NP_758862 NP_758863; NP_758869; NP_758871; NP_758865; NP_758866; NP_758867; NP_758868 | NP_034908 |
| Location (UCSC) | Chr 1: 207.75 – 207.8 Mb | Chr 1: 194.72 – 194.77 Mb |
| PubMed search |
- Wikidata
| View/Edit Human | View/Edit Mouse |

Membrane cofactor protein (MCP), CD46 complement regulatory protein also known as CD46 (cluster of differentiation 46) is a protein which in humans is encoded by the CD46 gene. CD46 is an inhibitory complement receptor.

== Gene ==
CD46 is found in a cluster on chromosome 1q32 with other genes encoding structural components of the complement system. At least fourteen different transcript variants encoding fourteen different isoforms have been found for this gene.

== Function ==
The protein encoded by this gene is a type I membrane protein and is a regulatory part of the complement system.

The encoded protein has cofactor activity for inactivation (through cleavage) of complement components C3b and C4b by serum factor I, which protects the host cell from damage by complement.

The protein encoded by this gene may be involved in the fusion of the spermatozoa with the oocyte during fertilization.

== Clinical significance ==
=== Measles infection ===
The encoded protein can act as a receptor for the Edmonston strain of measles virus, human herpesvirus-6 (HHV-6), group B adenoviruses, and type IV pili of pathogenic Neisseria.

The extracellular region of CD46 contains four short consensus repeats (SCR) of about 60 amino acids that fold into a compact beta-barrel domain surrounded by flexible loops. As has been demonstrated for CD46 with other ligands, the CD46 protein structure is believed to linearize upon binding HHV-6. While their precise interaction has not yet been determined, the second and third SCR domains have been demonstrated to be required for HHV-6 receptor binding and cellular entry. The heterotetramer gH/gL/gQ1/gQ2 complex of HHV-6 has been identified as a CD46 ligand.

=== Medulloblastoma ===
Established medulloblastoma (a malignant brain tumor common in childhood) specimens express CD46, and that medulloblastoma specimens removed from patients had a high level of CD46 expression. Therefore, a vaccine made of the Edmonston strain of measles virus could treat the medulloblastoma. Such a vaccine has already been tested in a number of trials involving other tumor types which have a high expression of CD46, including one type of adult brain tumor.

=== Prostate cancer ===
Recently, CD46 has emerged as a promising target for the treatment of both adenocarcinoma and neuroendocrine types of metastatic castration-resistant prostate cancer (mCRPC). YS5, a human full-length IgG1 with high specificity for CD46, was identified to have high binding affinity for prostate cancer tissue. YS5 has been developed into an antibody-drug conjugate, FOR46, which is currently in a phase I clinical trial (NCT03575819) for the treatment of mCRPC. Since then, a companion molecular imaging agent for CD46-targeted therapy has been developed.

=== Inflammatory diseases ===
CD46 deficiency contributes to inflammation disorders.

== Interactions ==
CD46 has been shown to interact with CD9, CD151 and CD29.
