= CD82 (gene) =

Mammalian protein found in humans

Identifiers
- Aliases: CD82, 4F9, C33, GR15, IA4, KAI1, R2, SAR2, ST6, TSPAN27, CD82 molecule
- External IDs: OMIM: 600623; MGI: 104651; GeneCards: CD82

Gene location (Human)
Chr.	Chromosome 11 (human)
Band	11p11.2	Start	44,564,427 bp
Band	11p11.2	End	44,620,358 bp

Gene location (Mouse)
Chr.	Chromosome 2 (mouse)
Band	2 E1|2 51.62 cM	Start	93,249,456 bp
Band	2 E1|2 51.62 cM	End	93,293,485 bp
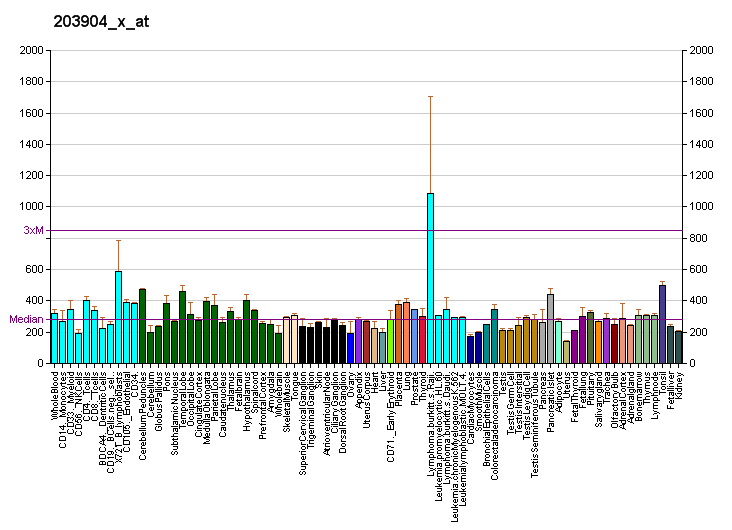
RNA expression pattern
Bgee	Human / Mouse (ortholog); Top expressed in: olfactory bulb; beta cell; mucosa of esophagus; upper lobe of left lung; lymph node; olfactory zone of nasal mucosa; right lung; skin of abdomen; gallbladder; thoracic diaphragm / Top expressed in: parotid gland; lacrimal gland; choroid plexus of fourth ventricle; granulocyte; tibiofemoral joint; fetal liver hematopoietic progenitor cell; submandibular gland; pyloric antrum; ileum; spleen; More reference expression data
BioGPS	More reference expression data
Gene ontology
Molecular function	protein binding
Cellular component	integral component of membrane; plasma membrane; integral component of plasma membrane; extracellular exosome; membrane
Biological process	cell surface receptor signaling pathway
Sources:Amigo / QuickGO
Orthologs
Databases	NCBI: entry; OMA: entry
Species	Human	Mouse
Entrez	3732	12521
Ensembl	ENSG00000085117	ENSMUSG00000027215
UniProt	P27701	P40237
RefSeq (mRNA)	NM_001024844; NM_002231	NM_001136055; NM_001271430; NM_001271431; NM_001271432; NM_001271461 NM_001271462; NM_007656
RefSeq (protein)	NP_001020015; NP_002222	NP_001129527; NP_001258359; NP_001258360; NP_001258361; NP_001258390 NP_001258391; NP_031682
Location (UCSC)	Chr 11: 44.56 – 44.62 Mb	Chr 2: 93.25 – 93.29 Mb
PubMed search
- Wikidata
View/Edit Human	View/Edit Mouse

CD82 (Cluster of Differentiation 82), or KAI1, is a human protein encoded by the CD82 gene.

This metastasis suppressor gene product is a membrane glycoprotein that is a member of the tetraspanin/transmembrane 4 superfamily. Expression of this gene has been shown to be downregulated in tumor progression of human cancers and can be activated by p53 through a consensus binding sequence in the promoter. Its expression and that of p53 are strongly correlated, and the loss of expression of these two proteins is associated with poor survival for prostate cancer patients. Two alternatively spliced transcript variants encoding distinct isoforms have been found for this gene.

== Interactions ==
CD82 (gene) has been shown to interact with CD19, CD63 and CD234.

CD82 plays a key role in the development of endometriosis.

== See also ==
- Cluster of differentiation
