= ROM1 =

Protein-coding gene in the species Homo sapiens

Identifiers
- Aliases: ROM1, ROM, ROSP1, RP7, TSPAN23, retinal outer segment membrane protein 1
- External IDs: OMIM: 180721; MGI: 97998; GeneCards: ROM1

Gene location (Human)
Chr.	Chromosome 11 (human)
Band	11q12.3	Start	62,611,722 bp
Band	11q12.3	End	62,615,116 bp

Gene location (Mouse)
Chr.	Chromosome 19 (mouse)
Band	19 A|19 6.03 cM	Start	8,904,755 bp
Band	19 A|19 6.03 cM	End	8,906,720 bp
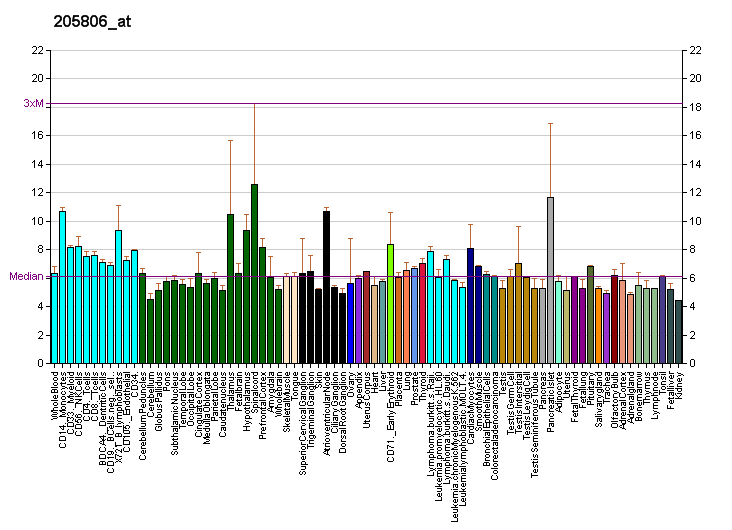
RNA expression pattern
Bgee	Human / Mouse (ortholog); Top expressed in: gonad; C1 segment; amygdala; putamen; caudate nucleus; nucleus accumbens; cingulate gyrus; anterior cingulate cortex; Descending thoracic aorta; right frontal lobe / Top expressed in: neural layer of retina; retinal pigment epithelium; epithelium of lens; pineal gland; corneal stroma; calvaria; interventricular septum; body of femur; muscle of thigh; myocardium of ventricle; More reference expression data
BioGPS	More reference expression data
Orthologs
Databases	NCBI: entry; OMA: entry
Species	Human	Mouse
Entrez	6094	19881
Ensembl	ENSG00000149489	ENSMUSG00000071648
UniProt	Q03395	P32958
RefSeq (mRNA)	NM_000327	NM_009073
RefSeq (protein)	NP_000318	NP_033099
Location (UCSC)	Chr 11: 62.61 – 62.62 Mb	Chr 19: 8.9 – 8.91 Mb
PubMed search
- Wikidata
View/Edit Human	View/Edit Mouse

Rod outer segment membrane protein 1 is a protein that in humans is encoded by the ROM1 gene.

This gene is a member of a photoreceptor-specific gene family and encodes an integral membrane protein found in the photoreceptor disk rim of the eye. This protein can form homodimers or can heterodimerize with another photoreceptor protein, peripherin-2 (PRPH2; retinal degeneration, slow; RDS). It is essential for disk morphogenesis, and may also function as an adhesion molecule involved in the stabilization and compaction of outer segment disks or in the maintenance of the curvature of the rim. Certain defects in this gene have been associated with the degenerative eye disease retinitis pigmentosa.
