= Tetraspanin 18 =

Protein-coding gene in the species Homo sapiens

TSPAN18

Identifiers
- Aliases: TSPAN18, TSPAN, tetraspanin 18
- External IDs: MGI: 1917186; GeneCards: TSPAN18

Gene location (Human)
| Chr. | Chromosome 11 (human) |
| Band | 11p11.2 | Start | 44,726,465 bp |
| Band | 11p11.2 | End | 44,932,423 bp |

Gene location (Mouse)
| Chr. | Chromosome 2 (mouse) |
| Band | 2|2 E1 | Start | 93,032,105 bp |
| Band | 2|2 E1 | End | 93,164,850 bp |
RNA expression pattern
| Bgee | Human / Mouse (ortholog); Top expressed in: cardiac muscle tissue of right atrium; myocardium of left ventricle; right auricle of heart; apex of heart; smooth muscle tissue; ganglionic eminence; right adrenal gland; right adrenal cortex; ventricular zone; cerebellar hemisphere / Top expressed in: internal carotid artery; ventricular zone; external carotid artery; brown adipose tissue; hand; lumbar spinal ganglion; yolk sac; habenula; dentate gyrus of hippocampal formation granule cell; right lung; More reference expression data |
| BioGPS | n/a |
Orthologs
| Databases | NCBI: entry; OMA: entry |
| Species | Human | Mouse |
| Entrez | 90139 | 241556 |
| Ensembl | ENSG00000157570 | ENSMUSG00000027217 |
| UniProt | Q96SJ8 | Q80WR1 |
| RefSeq (mRNA) | NM_001031730; NM_130783 | NM_183180 |
| RefSeq (protein) | NP_570139 | NP_899003 |
| Location (UCSC) | Chr 11: 44.73 – 44.93 Mb | Chr 2: 93.03 – 93.16 Mb |
| PubMed search |
- Wikidata
| View/Edit Human | View/Edit Mouse |

Tetraspanin 18 is a protein that in humans is encoded by the TSPAN18 gene.
