= TSPAN2 =

Protein-coding gene in humans

Identifiers
- Aliases: TSPAN2, NET3, TSN2, TSPAN-2, tetraspanin 2
- External IDs: OMIM: 613133; MGI: 1917997; GeneCards: TSPAN2

Gene location (Human)
Chr.	Chromosome 1 (human)
Band	1p13.2	Start	115,048,011 bp
Band	1p13.2	End	115,089,503 bp

Gene location (Mouse)
Chr.	Chromosome 3 (mouse)
Band	3|3 F2.2	Start	102,641,845 bp
Band	3|3 F2.2	End	102,708,829 bp
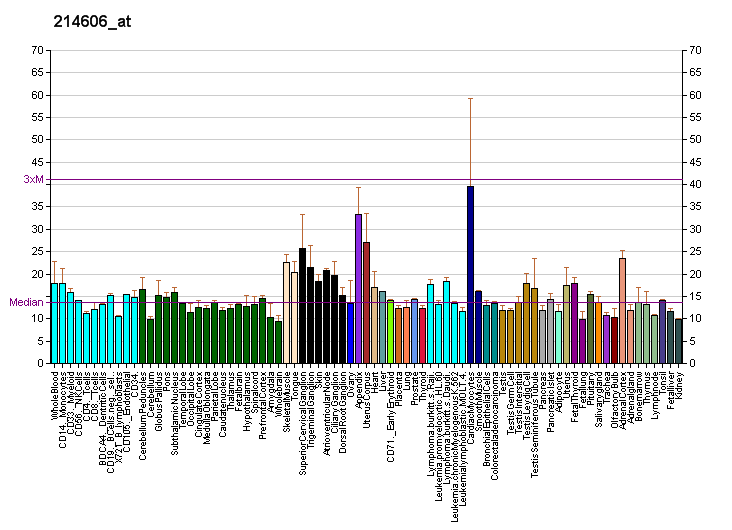
RNA expression pattern
Bgee	Human / Mouse (ortholog); Top expressed in: body of uterus; muscle layer of sigmoid colon; popliteal artery; tibial arteries; right coronary artery; tail of epididymis; Descending thoracic aorta; ascending aorta; islet of Langerhans; gastric mucosa / Top expressed in: ventral tegmental area; lateral geniculate nucleus; globus pallidus; deep cerebellar nuclei; left lung lobe; lateral hypothalamus; right lung; medial geniculate nucleus; right lung lobe; central gray substance of midbrain; More reference expression data
BioGPS	More reference expression data
Gene ontology
Molecular function	protein binding
Cellular component	integral component of membrane; myelin sheath; plasma membrane; integral component of plasma membrane; membrane
Biological process	astrocyte development; myelination; cell surface receptor signaling pathway; axon development; brain development; oligodendrocyte differentiation; inflammatory response; microglia development
Sources:Amigo / QuickGO
Orthologs
Databases	NCBI: entry; OMA: entry
Species	Human	Mouse
Entrez	10100	70747
Ensembl	ENSG00000134198	ENSMUSG00000027858
UniProt	O60636	Q922J6
RefSeq (mRNA)	NM_001308315; NM_001308316; NM_005725	NM_001243132; NM_027533
RefSeq (protein)	NP_001295244; NP_001295245; NP_005716	NP_001230061; NP_081809
Location (UCSC)	Chr 1: 115.05 – 115.09 Mb	Chr 3: 102.64 – 102.71 Mb
PubMed search
- Wikidata
View/Edit Human	View/Edit Mouse

Tetraspanin-2 is a protein that in humans is encoded by the TSPAN2 gene.

The protein encoded by this gene is a member of the transmembrane 4 superfamily, also known as the tetraspanin family. Most of these members are cell-surface proteins that are characterized by the presence of four hydrophobic domains. The proteins mediate signal transduction events that play a role in the regulation of cell development, activation, growth and motility.
