= CD53 =

Mammalian protein found in humans

Identifiers
- Aliases: CD53, MOX44, TSPAN25, CD53 molecule
- External IDs: OMIM: 151525; MGI: 88341; GeneCards: CD53

Gene location (Human)
| Chr. | Chromosome 1 (human) |
| Band | 1p13.3 | Start | 110,871,188 bp |
| Band | 1p13.3 | End | 110,899,922 bp |

Gene location (Mouse)
| Chr. | Chromosome 3 (mouse) |
| Band | 3 F2.3|3 46.53 cM | Start | 106,667,237 bp |
| Band | 3 F2.3|3 46.53 cM | End | 106,697,465 bp |
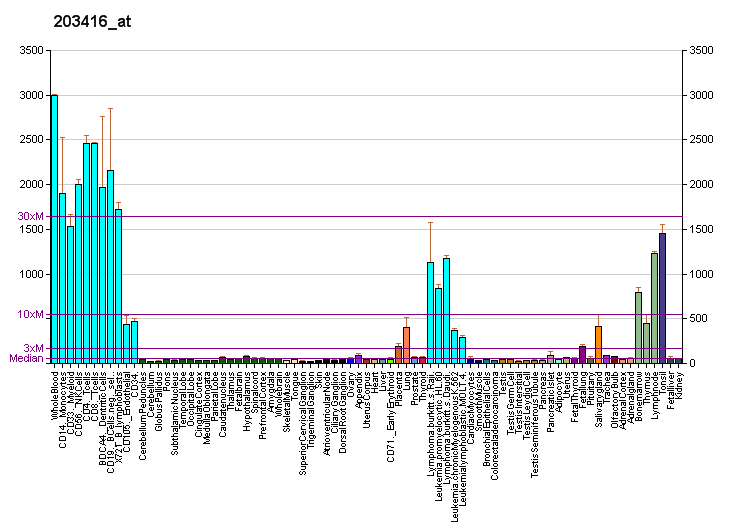
RNA expression pattern
| Bgee | Human / Mouse (ortholog); Top expressed in: blood; granulocyte; mononuclear cell; monocyte; spleen; appendix; lymph node; bone marrow; bone marrow cell; epithelium of nasopharynx / Top expressed in: granulocyte; mesenteric lymph nodes; spleen; stroma of bone marrow; tibiofemoral joint; blood; right lung lobe; thymus; calvaria; subcutaneous adipose tissue; More reference expression data |
| BioGPS | More reference expression data |
Gene ontology
| Molecular function | protein binding |
| Cellular component | integral component of membrane; cell surface; cell junction; plasma membrane; integral component of plasma membrane; extracellular exosome; membrane; cell-cell junction; immunological synapse; specific granule membrane; tertiary granule membrane |
| Biological process | positive regulation of myoblast fusion; cell surface receptor signaling pathway; signal transduction; neutrophil degranulation |
Sources:Amigo / QuickGO
Orthologs
| Databases | NCBI: entry; OMA: entry |
| Species | Human | Mouse |
| Entrez | 963 | 12508 |
| Ensembl | ENSG00000143119 | ENSMUSG00000040747 |
| UniProt | P19397 | Q61451 |
| RefSeq (mRNA) | NM_000560; NM_001040033; NM_001320638 | NM_007651 |
| RefSeq (protein) | NP_000551; NP_001035122; NP_001307567 | NP_031677 |
| Location (UCSC) | Chr 1: 110.87 – 110.9 Mb | Chr 3: 106.67 – 106.7 Mb |
| PubMed search |
- Wikidata
| View/Edit Human | View/Edit Mouse |

Leukocyte surface antigen CD53 is a protein that in humans is encoded by the CD53 gene.

The protein encoded by this gene is a member of the transmembrane 4 superfamily, also known as the tetraspanin family. Most of these members are cell-surface proteins that are characterized by the presence of four hydrophobic domains. The proteins mediate signal transduction events that play a role in the regulation of cell development, activation, growth and motility. This encoded protein is a cell surface glycoprotein that is known to complex with integrins. It contributes to the transduction of CD2-generated signals in T cells and natural killer cells and has been suggested to play a role in growth regulation. Familial deficiency of this gene has been linked to an immunodeficiency associated with recurrent infectious diseases caused by bacteria, fungi and viruses. Alternative splicing results in multiple transcript variants encoding the same protein.

== See also ==
- Cluster of differentiation
- Tetraspanin
