= TSPAN4 =

Protein-coding gene in humans

Identifiers
- Aliases: TSPAN4, NAG-2, NAG2, TETRASPAN, TM4SF7, TSPAN-4, tetraspanin 4
- External IDs: OMIM: 602644; MGI: 1928097; GeneCards: TSPAN4

Gene location (Human)
Chr.	Chromosome 11 (human)
Band	11p15.5	Start	842,812 bp
Band	11p15.5	End	867,116 bp

Gene location (Mouse)
Chr.	Chromosome 7 (mouse)
Band	7|7 F5	Start	141,055,153 bp
Band	7|7 F5	End	141,073,340 bp
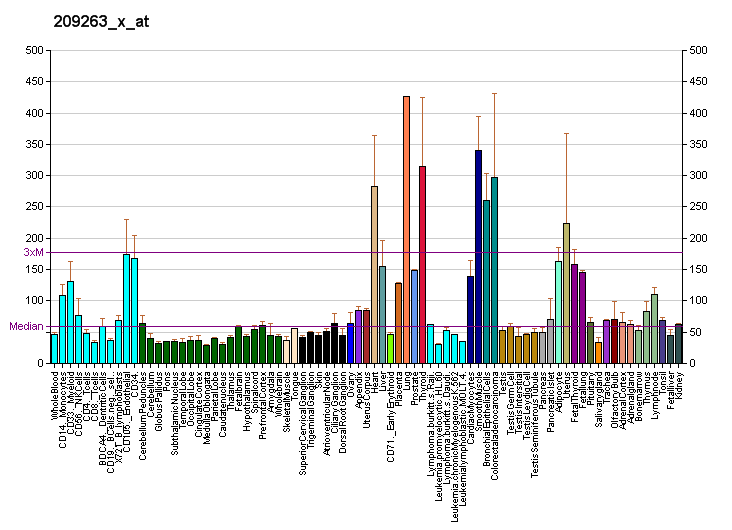

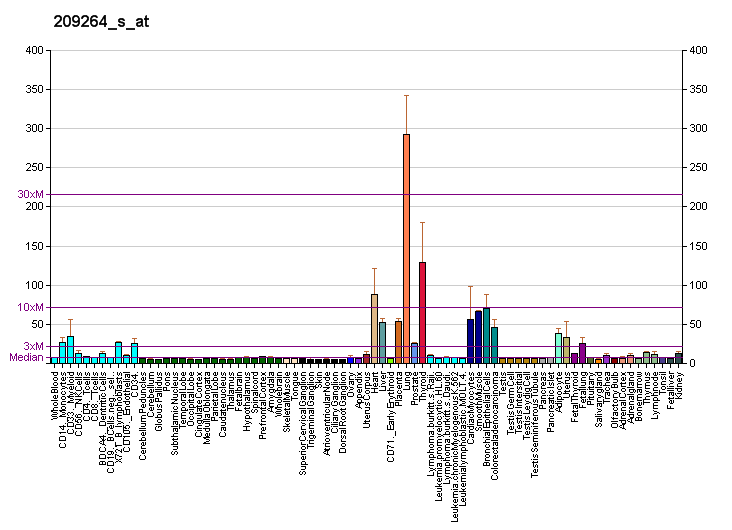
RNA expression pattern
Bgee	Human / Mouse (ortholog); Top expressed in: stromal cell of endometrium; right lung; left uterine tube; right ovary; canal of the cervix; left ovary; body of uterus; subcutaneous adipose tissue; upper lobe of left lung; tibial nerve / Top expressed in: stroma of bone marrow; decidua; calvaria; gastrula; endothelial cell of lymphatic vessel; internal carotid artery; external carotid artery; right kidney; adrenal gland; choroid plexus of fourth ventricle; More reference expression data
BioGPS	More reference expression data
Gene ontology
Molecular function	antigen binding; integrin binding; protein binding
Cellular component	integral component of membrane; vesicle; plasma membrane; integral component of plasma membrane; membrane; focal adhesion
Biological process	cell surface receptor signaling pathway; protein-containing complex assembly
Sources:Amigo / QuickGO
Orthologs
Databases	NCBI: entry; OMA: entry
Species	Human	Mouse
Entrez	7106	64540
Ensembl	ENSG00000214063	ENSMUSG00000025511
UniProt	O14817	Q9DCK3
RefSeq (mRNA)	NM_001025234; NM_001025235; NM_001025236; NM_001025237; NM_001025238 NM_001025239; NM_003271	NM_001252588; NM_053082
RefSeq (protein)	NP_001020405; NP_001020406; NP_001020407; NP_001020408; NP_001020409 NP_001020410; NP_003262	NP_001239517; NP_444312; NP_001390284; NP_001390285; NP_001390286 NP_001390287
Location (UCSC)	Chr 11: 0.84 – 0.87 Mb	Chr 7: 141.06 – 141.07 Mb
PubMed search
- Wikidata
View/Edit Human	View/Edit Mouse

Tetraspanin-4 is a protein that in humans is encoded by the TSPAN4 gene.

The protein encoded by this gene is a member of the transmembrane 4 superfamily, also known as the tetraspanin family. Most of these members are cell-surface proteins that are characterized by the presence of four hydrophobic domains. The proteins mediate signal transduction events that play a role in the regulation of cell development, activation, growth and motility. This encoded protein is a cell surface glycoprotein and is similar in sequence to its family member CD53 antigen. It is known to complex with integrins and other transmembrane 4 superfamily proteins. Alternatively spliced transcript variants encoding different isoforms have been identified.

== Interactions ==
TSPAN4 has been shown to interact with CD9, ITGA6, CD29, CD49c and CD81.
