= TSPAN14 =

Protein-coding gene in humans

Identifiers
- Aliases: TSPAN14, DC-TM4F2, TM4SF14, tetraspanin 14
- External IDs: MGI: 1196325; GeneCards: TSPAN14

Gene location (Human)
Chr.	Chromosome 10 (human)
Band	10q23.1	Start	80,454,166 bp
Band	10q23.1	End	80,533,124 bp

Gene location (Mouse)
Chr.	Chromosome 14 (mouse)
Band	14 B|14 22.36 cM	Start	40,628,402 bp
Band	14 B|14 22.36 cM	End	40,688,764 bp
RNA expression pattern
Bgee	Human / Mouse (ortholog); Top expressed in: right lung; granulocyte; tibial nerve; upper lobe of left lung; monocyte; subcutaneous adipose tissue; skin of leg; skin of abdomen; apex of heart; ganglionic eminence / Top expressed in: decidua; primary oocyte; granulocyte; gastrula; stroma of bone marrow; transitional epithelium of urinary bladder; secondary oocyte; lens; right kidney; molar; More reference expression data
BioGPS	n/a
Gene ontology
Molecular function	enzyme binding
Cellular component	integral component of membrane; integral component of plasma membrane; membrane; plasma membrane; specific granule membrane; tertiary granule membrane; cell surface; tetraspanin-enriched microdomain; endoplasmic reticulum lumen
Biological process	positive regulation of Notch signaling pathway; neutrophil degranulation; protein localization to plasma membrane; protein maturation; cell surface receptor signaling pathway
Sources:Amigo / QuickGO
Orthologs
Databases	NCBI: entry; OMA: entry
Species	Human	Mouse
Entrez	81619	52588
Ensembl	ENSG00000108219	ENSMUSG00000037824
UniProt	Q8NG11	Q8QZY6
RefSeq (mRNA)	NM_001128309; NM_030927; NM_001351266; NM_001351267; NM_001351268 NM_001351269; NM_001351270; NM_001351271; NM_001351272	NM_145928; NM_001316748
RefSeq (protein)	NP_001121781; NP_112189; NP_001338195; NP_001338196; NP_001338197 NP_001338198; NP_001338199; NP_001338200; NP_001338201	NP_001303677; NP_666040
Location (UCSC)	Chr 10: 80.45 – 80.53 Mb	Chr 14: 40.63 – 40.69 Mb
PubMed search
- Wikidata
View/Edit Human	View/Edit Mouse

Tetraspanin 14 is a protein that in humans is encoded by the TSPAN14 gene.
