= Uroplakin-1b =

UPK1B

Identifiers
- Aliases: UPK1B, TSPAN20, UPIB, UPK1, uroplakin 1B
- External IDs: OMIM: 602380; MGI: 98912; GeneCards: UPK1B

Gene location (Human)
Chr.	Chromosome 3 (human)
Band	3q13.32	Start	119,173,517 bp
Band	3q13.32	End	119,205,143 bp

Gene location (Mouse)
Chr.	Chromosome 16 (mouse)
Band	16|16 B4	Start	38,593,546 bp
Band	16|16 B4	End	38,620,690 bp
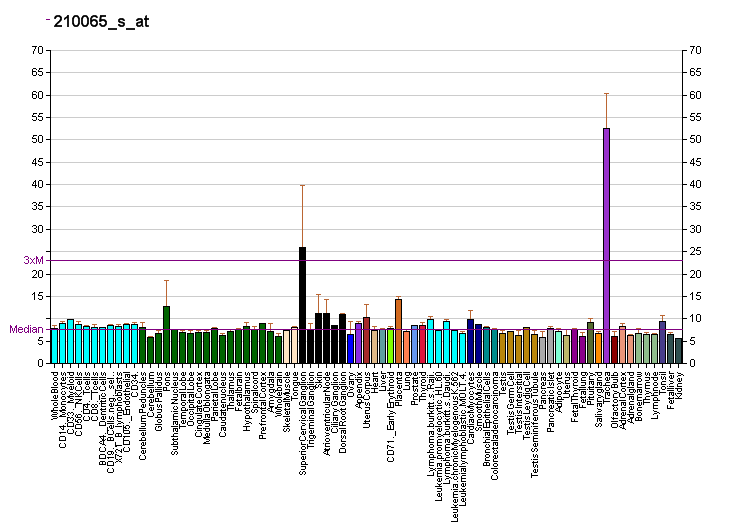

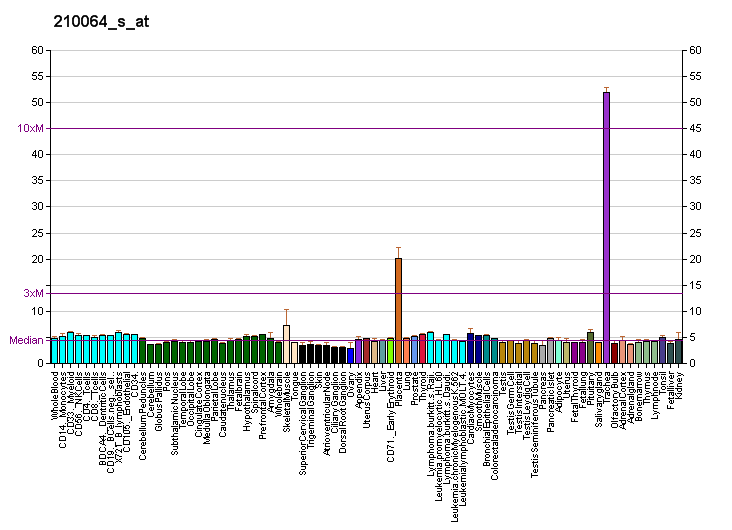
RNA expression pattern
Bgee	Human / Mouse (ortholog); Top expressed in: palpebral conjunctiva; epithelium of nasopharynx; nasal epithelium; amniotic fluid; parietal pleura; mucosa of urinary bladder; trachea; pancreatic ductal cell; germinal epithelium; olfactory zone of nasal mucosa / Top expressed in: transitional epithelium of urinary bladder; squamous epithelium; mesothelium; serous sac; conjunctival fornix; umbilical cord; seminal vesicula; condyle; cornea; peritoneal sac; More reference expression data
BioGPS	More reference expression data
Gene ontology
Molecular function	structural molecule activity
Cellular component	integral component of membrane; integral component of plasma membrane; extracellular exosome; apical plasma membrane; membrane; apical plasma membrane urothelial plaque
Biological process	cell surface receptor signaling pathway; epithelial cell differentiation; response to bacterium
Sources:Amigo / QuickGO
Orthologs
Databases	NCBI: entry; OMA: entry
Species	Human	Mouse
Entrez	7348	22268
Ensembl	ENSG00000114638	ENSMUSG00000049436
UniProt	O75841	Q9Z2C6
RefSeq (mRNA)	NM_006952	NM_178924
RefSeq (protein)	NP_008883	NP_849255
Location (UCSC)	Chr 3: 119.17 – 119.21 Mb	Chr 16: 38.59 – 38.62 Mb
PubMed search
- Wikidata
View/Edit Human	View/Edit Mouse

Uroplakin-1b (UP1b), is a protein which in humans is encoded by the UPK1B gene.

== Function ==
The protein encoded by this gene is a member of the transmembrane 4 superfamily, also known as the tetraspanin family. Most of these members are cell-surface proteins that are characterized by the presence of four hydrophobic domains. These proteins mediate signal transduction events that play a role in the regulation of cell development, activation, growth and motility. This encoded protein is found in the asymmetrical unit membrane (AUM) where it can form a complex with other transmembrane 4 superfamily proteins. It may play a role in normal bladder epithelial physiology, possibly in regulating membrane permeability of superficial umbrella cells or in stabilizing the apical membrane through AUM/cytoskeletal interactions. The AUM is believed to be involved in strengthening the cells that line the bladder, and in enhancing the inner bladder membrane's ability to stretch, thus preventing these cells from rupturing during bladder distension. The use of alternate polyadenylation sites has been found for this gene.
