= CD63 =

Mammalian protein found in humans

Identifiers
- Aliases: CD63, LAMP-3, ME491, MLA1, OMA81H, TSPAN30, CD63 molecule
- External IDs: OMIM: 155740; MGI: 99529; GeneCards: CD63

Gene location (Human)
Chr.	Chromosome 12 (human)
Band	12q13.2	Start	55,725,323 bp
Band	12q13.2	End	55,729,707 bp

Gene location (Mouse)
Chr.	Chromosome 10 (mouse)
Band	10 D3|10 77.19 cM	Start	128,736,858 bp
Band	10 D3|10 77.19 cM	End	128,748,691 bp
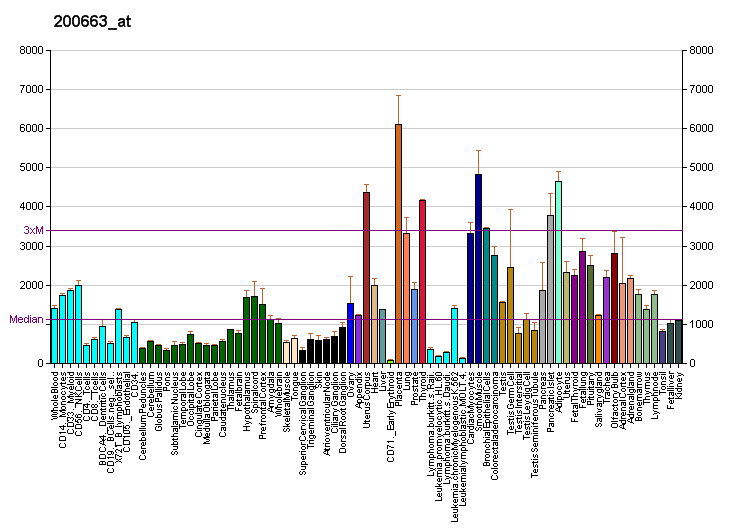
RNA expression pattern
Bgee	Human / Mouse (ortholog); Top expressed in: stromal cell of endometrium; tendon of biceps brachii; beta cell; lower lobe of lung; upper lobe of lung; left adrenal gland; olfactory bulb; Descending thoracic aorta; upper lobe of left lung; decidua / Top expressed in: right kidney; proximal tubule; human kidney; islet of Langerhans; morula; blastocyst; yolk sac; stomach; urinary bladder; adrenal gland; More reference expression data
BioGPS	More reference expression data
Gene ontology
Molecular function	protein binding
Cellular component	integral component of membrane; multivesicular body; endosome; multivesicular body membrane; membrane; late endosome membrane; intrinsic component of plasma membrane; melanosome; plasma membrane; integral component of plasma membrane; endosome lumen; multivesicular body, internal vesicle; lysosomal membrane; extracellular region; platelet dense granule membrane; lysosome; endosome membrane; extracellular exosome; extracellular space; cell surface; azurophil granule membrane; late endosome
Biological process	positive regulation of receptor internalization; platelet degranulation; pigment granule maturation; endosome to melanosome transport; protein transport; positive regulation of integrin-mediated signaling pathway; cell-matrix adhesion; cell migration; neutrophil degranulation; transport; pigmentation; pigment cell differentiation; regulation of vascular endothelial growth factor signaling pathway; cell surface receptor signaling pathway; positive regulation of endocytosis; regulation of potassium ion transmembrane transport
Sources:Amigo / QuickGO
Orthologs
Databases	NCBI: entry; OMA: entry
Species	Human	Mouse
Entrez	967	12512
Ensembl	ENSG00000135404	ENSMUSG00000025351
UniProt	P08962	P41731
RefSeq (mRNA)	NM_001780; NM_001040034; NM_001257389; NM_001257390; NM_001257391 NM_001257392; NM_001257400; NM_001257401; NM_001267698	NM_001042580; NM_001282966; NM_007653
RefSeq (protein)	NP_001244318; NP_001244319; NP_001244320; NP_001244321; NP_001244329 NP_001244330; NP_001254627; NP_001771	NP_001036045; NP_001269895; NP_031679
Location (UCSC)	Chr 12: 55.73 – 55.73 Mb	Chr 10: 128.74 – 128.75 Mb
PubMed search
- Wikidata
View/Edit Human	View/Edit Mouse

CD63 antigen is a protein that, in humans, is encoded by the CD63 gene. CD63 is mainly associated with membranes of intracellular vesicles, although cell surface expression may be induced.

== Function ==
The protein encoded by this gene is a member of the transmembrane 4 superfamily, also known as the tetraspanin family. Most of these members are cell-surface proteins that are characterized by the presence of four hydrophobic domains. The proteins mediate signal transduction events that play a role in the regulation of cell development, activation, growth, and motility. This encoded protein is a cell surface glycoprotein that is known to complex with integrins. It may function as a blood platelet activation marker. Deficiency of this protein is associated with Hermansky-Pudlak Syndrome. Also this gene has been associated with tumor progression. The use of alternate polyadenylation sites has been found for this gene. Alternative splicing results in multiple transcript variants encoding different proteins.

== Allergy diagnosis ==
CD63 is a good marker for flow cytometric quantification of in vitro-activated basophils for the diagnosis of IgE-mediated allergy. The test is commonly designated as basophil activation test (BAT).

== Research ==
Initially, deletion and point mutants were used to investigate the role of the C-terminus, which contains a putative lysosomal-targeting/internalisation motif (GYEVM). C-terminal mutants showed increased surface expression and decreased intracellular localisation relative to CD63Wt. Antibody induced internalisation was reduced in C-terminal deletion mutants and abolished in G→A and Y→A mutants, showing the crucial role of these residues in internalisation.

CD63 is extensively and variably glycosylated and the EC2 region contain three potential N-linked glycosylation sites (N130, N150, and N172). Mutants N130A and N150A were similar to hCD63Wt with respect to intracellular localisation and internalisation. However, the hCD63N172A mutant showed a mainly cell surface localisation and low internalisation. Expression of a mutant lacking all three glycosylation sites was very unstable. It was speculated that the reduced internalisation of CD63N172A might be due to changes in its interaction with cell surface molecules. Immunoprecipitation experiments showed some evidence of a protein (100kDa) associating with CD63N172A, but this was not consistent. However, an association between CD63Wt and β2 integrin (CD18) was shown by co-internalisation of these proteins. Interactions with CD63 may therefore affect the trafficking and function of β2 integrins.

In cell biology, CD63 is often used as a marker for multivesicular bodies, which in some cells are enriched with CD63, as well as for extracellular vesicles released from either the multivesicular body or the plasma membrane.

== Interactions ==
CD63 has been shown to interact with CD117 and CD82.

== See also ==
- Cluster of differentiation
