= CD151 =

Protein-coding gene in humans

Identifiers
- Aliases: CD151, GP27, MER2, PETA-3, RAPH, SFA1, TSPAN24, CD151 molecule (Raph blood group), EBS7
- External IDs: OMIM: 602243; MGI: 1096360; GeneCards: CD151

Gene location (Human)
Chr.	Chromosome 11 (human)
Band	11p15.5	Start	832,887 bp
Band	11p15.5	End	839,831 bp

Gene location (Mouse)
Chr.	Chromosome 7 (mouse)
Band	7 F5|7 86.82 cM	Start	141,047,305 bp
Band	7 F5|7 86.82 cM	End	141,051,386 bp
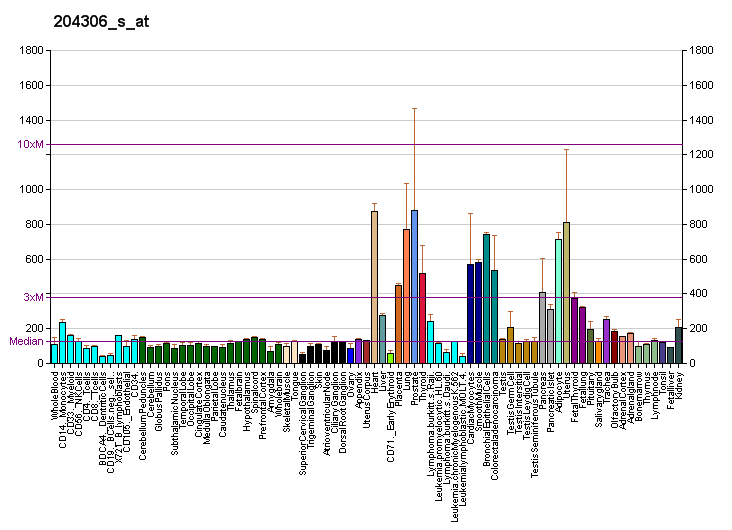
RNA expression pattern
Bgee	Human / Mouse (ortholog); Top expressed in: Descending thoracic aorta; ascending aorta; right coronary artery; left coronary artery; popliteal artery; tibial arteries; stromal cell of endometrium; apex of heart; body of pancreas; upper lobe of left lung / Top expressed in: endothelial cell of lymphatic vessel; medullary collecting duct; Paneth cell; renal corpuscle; iris; tunica media of zone of aorta; carotid body; tunica adventitia of aorta; ciliary body; decidua; More reference expression data
BioGPS	More reference expression data
Gene ontology
Molecular function	integrin binding; protein binding
Cellular component	cytosol; membrane; focal adhesion; basement membrane; integral component of membrane; integral component of plasma membrane; plasma membrane; cell surface
Biological process	cell adhesion; cell surface receptor signaling pathway; hemidesmosome assembly; T cell proliferation; cell migration; positive regulation of cell migration; wound healing, spreading of cells; positive regulation of endocytosis
Sources:Amigo / QuickGO
Orthologs
Databases	NCBI: entry; OMA: entry
Species	Human	Mouse
Entrez	977	12476
Ensembl	ENSG00000177697	ENSMUSG00000025510
UniProt	P48509; Q6ZNZ0	O35566
RefSeq (mRNA)	NM_139030; NM_001039490; NM_004357; NM_139029	NM_001111049; NM_001111050; NM_009842
RefSeq (protein)	NP_001034579; NP_004348; NP_620598; NP_620599; NP_001034579.1 NP_004348.2; NP_620598.1; NP_620599.1	NP_001104519; NP_001104520; NP_033972
Location (UCSC)	Chr 11: 0.83 – 0.84 Mb	Chr 7: 141.05 – 141.05 Mb
PubMed search
- Wikidata
View/Edit Human	View/Edit Mouse

CD151 molecule (Raph blood group), also known as CD151 (Cluster of Differentiation 151), is a human gene.

== Function ==
The protein encoded by this gene is a member of the transmembrane 4 superfamily, also known as the tetraspanin family. Most of these members are cell-surface proteins that are characterized by the presence of four hydrophobic domains. The proteins mediate signal transduction events that play a role in the regulation of cell development, activation, growth and motility. This encoded protein is a cell surface glycoprotein that is known to complex with integrins and other transmembrane 4 superfamily proteins. It is involved in cellular processes including cell adhesion and may regulate integrin trafficking and/or function. This protein enhances cell motility, invasion and metastasis of cancer cells. Multiple alternatively spliced transcript variants that encode the same protein have been described for this gene. Abnormalities in CD151 have been implicated in a form of epidermolysis bullosa.

== Interactions ==
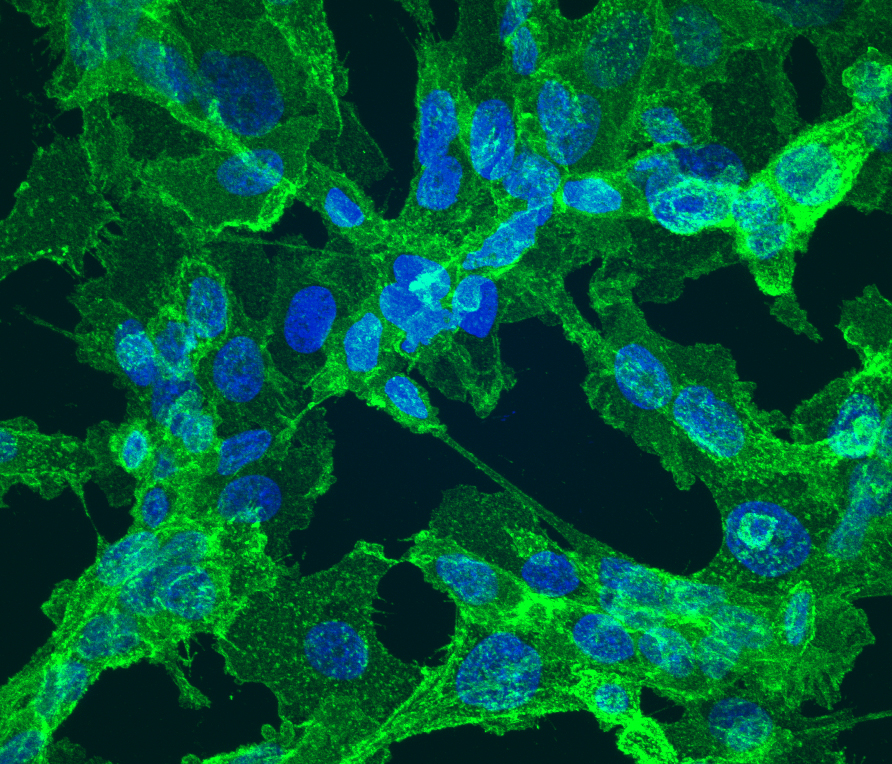
Fibrosarcoma cells, reportedly stained with an antibody binding to CD151 (green) and a dye for the nucleus (blue).

CD151 has been shown to interact with CD46.

== See also ==
- Cluster of differentiation
- Tetraspanin
