= Belimumab =

Pharmaceutical drug

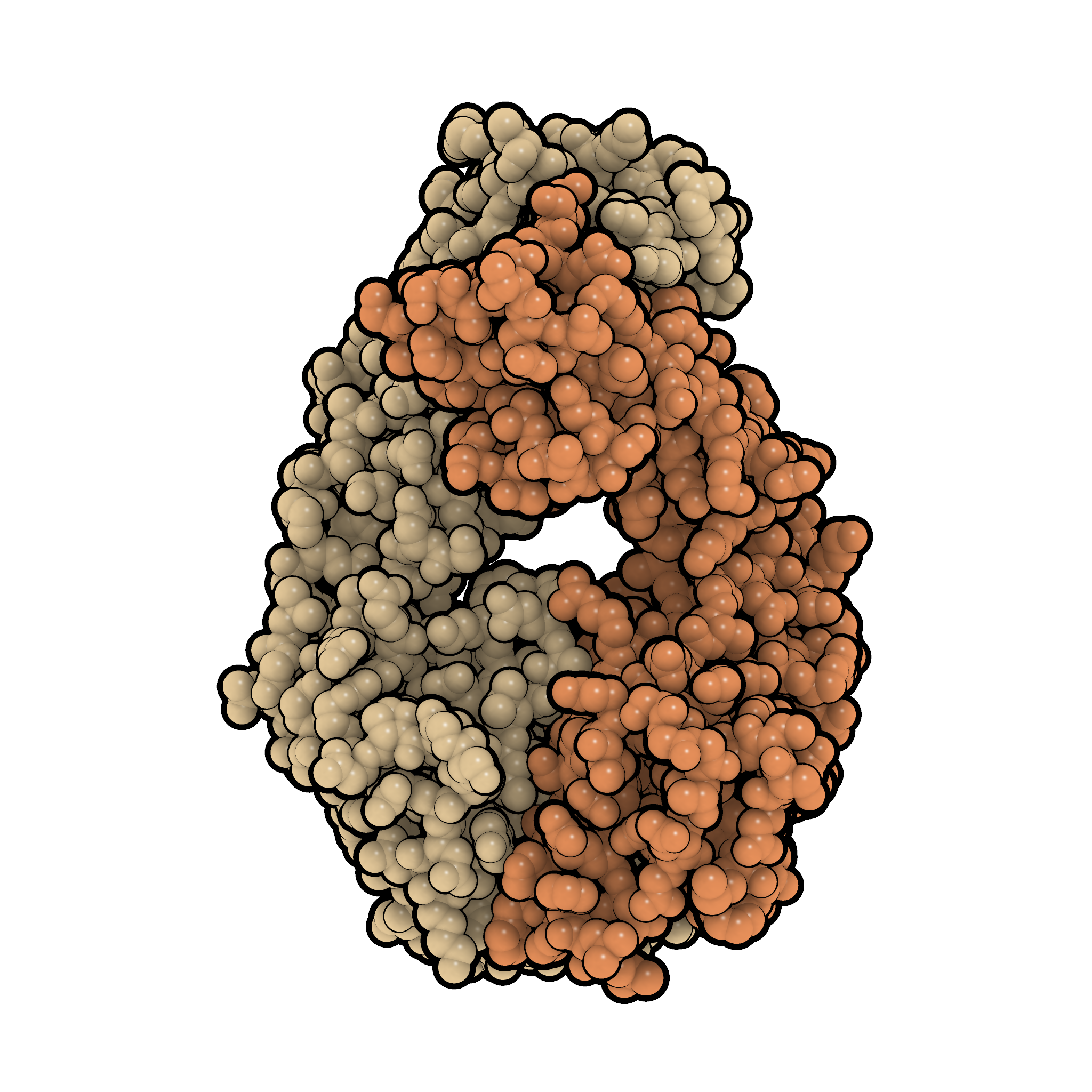
- Fab fragment of belimumab. PDB: 5Y9K.

Monoclonal antibody
- Type: Whole antibody
- Source: Human
- Target: B-cell activating factor (BAFF, BLyS)

Clinical data
- Trade names: Benlysta
- Other names: LymphoStat-B
- AHFS/Drugs.com: Monograph
- MedlinePlus: a611027
- License data: US DailyMed: Belimumab
- Pregnancy category: AU: C
- Routes of administration: Intravenous, subcutaneous
- ATC code: L04AG04 (WHO)

Legal status
- Legal status: AU: S4 (Prescription only); CA: ℞-only / Schedule D; US: ℞-only; EU: Rx-only

Identifiers
- CAS Number: 356547-88-1
- DrugBank: DB08879
- ChemSpider: none
- UNII: 73B0K5S26A
- KEGG: D03068
- ChEMBL: ChEMBL1789843

Chemical and physical data
- Formula: C_{6358}H_{9904}N_{1728}O_{2010}S_{44}
- Molar mass: 144121.90 g·mol^{−1}

Belimumab, sold under the brand name Benlysta, is a human monoclonal antibody that inhibits B-cell activating factor (BAFF), also known as B-lymphocyte stimulator (BLyS). It is approved in the United States and Canada, and the European Union to treat systemic lupus erythematosus and lupus nephritis.

The most common side effects include bacterial infections, such as bronchitis (infection in the lungs) and infection of the urinary tract (structures that produce or carry urine), diarrhea and nausea (feeling sick).

== Medical uses ==
Belimumab is indicated for the treatment of active systemic lupus erythematosus and active lupus nephritis.

== Side effects and interactions ==
Common adverse effects reported with belimumab include nausea, diarrhea, and fever, as well as hypersensitivity and infusion-site reactions, which were severe in 0.9% of patients. Regulatory agencies recommend that patients be treated with an antihistamine prior to a belimumab infusion.

Because belimumab is an immunosuppressant, more serious infections and deaths were reported among patients treated with the drug than among those treated with placebo.

No interaction studies have been carried out, but combining belimumab with other immunosuppressants—especially those targeting B lymphocytes, such as anti-CD20 therapies—could increase the risk of severe infections. Likewise, combining belimumab with intravenous cyclophosphamide or live vaccines is not recommended.

== Mechanism of action ==
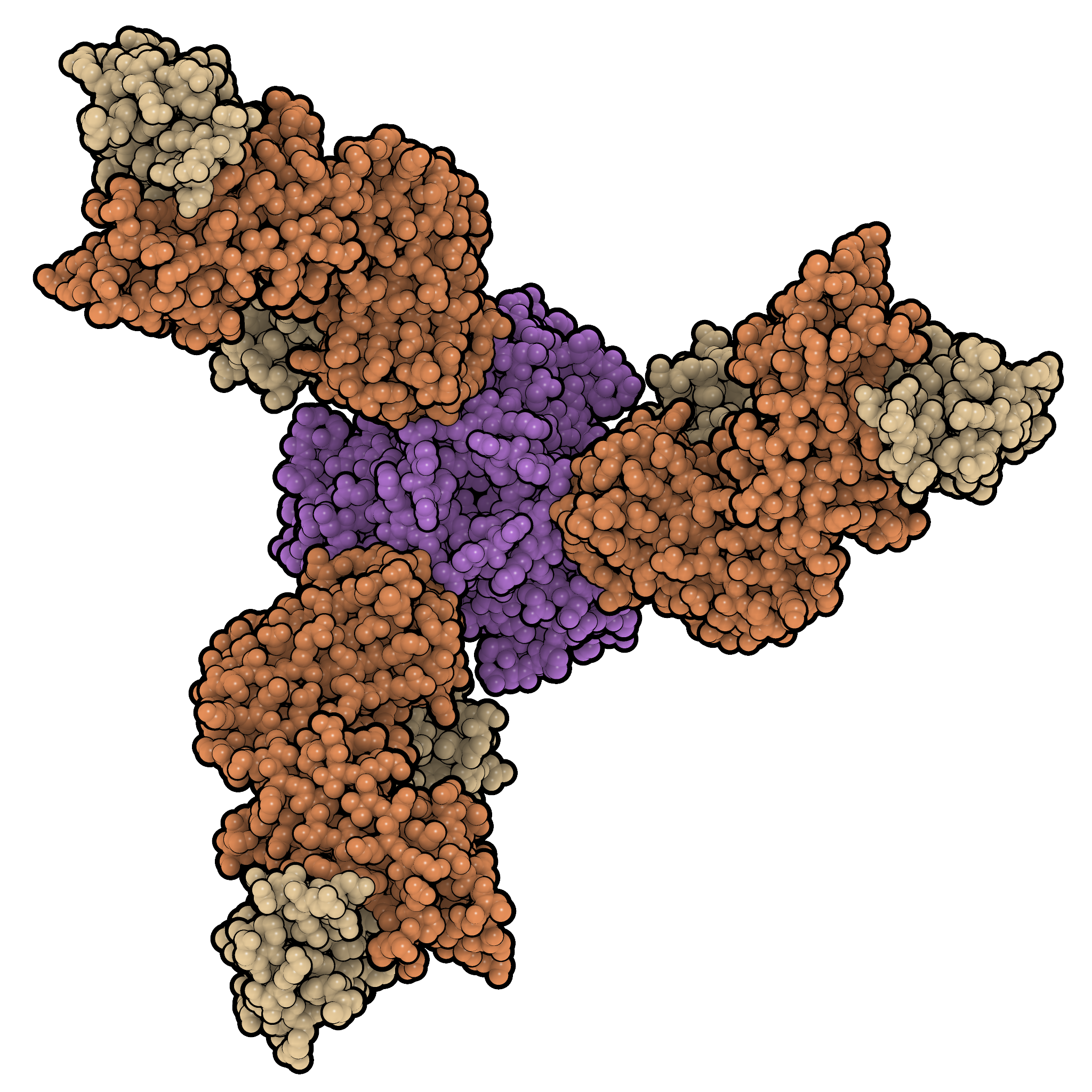
Space-filling model illustrating three molecules of belimumab (tan/orange) binding a homotrimer of BAFF. PDB: 5Y9J.

B lymphocytes (B cells), which are part of the normal immune response, are also responsible for the over-aggressive response seen in autoimmune diseases like systemic lupus erythematosus. B cells develop in the bone marrow and continue to mature peripherally in secondary lymphoid organs and in the gut. When autoimmune B cells attack the body's own tissues, they are normally destroyed by cell suicide (apoptosis). Researchers theorize that systemic lupus erythematosus is caused when autoimmune B cells proliferate and survival factors protect them from cell suicide.

B-cell activating factor (BAFF), also called B-lymphocyte stimulator (BLyS), is required for the development and survival of B cells. In systemic lupus erythematosus patients, BAFF is overexpressed, which may cause autoimmune B cell proliferation and survival. Belimumab binds to BAFF and prevents it from binding to B cells. Without BAFF, B cells commit suicide and no longer contribute to the autoimmune damage of systemic lupus erythematosus.

BAFF is secreted by a variety of cells: monocytes and macrophages; bone marrow stromal cells; astrocytes in certain glioblastomas; synoviocytes in rheumatoid arthritis; and salivary epithelial cells in Sjögren syndrome. It interacts with three membrane receptors on B lymphocytes:

- BAFF-R (BAFF receptor)
- BCMA (B cell maturation antigen)
- TACI (transmembrane activator and calcium modulator and cyclophilin ligand interactor)

When BAFF binds to BAFF-R and BCMA on B cells, levels of Bcl-2, a survival factor, are increased. When all three BAFF receptors are stimulated, levels of NF kappa B, which contributes to cell proliferation and differentiation, are increased in the nucleus.

Another B-cell activator similar to BAFF is APRIL (A proliferation-inducing ligand), but APRIL activates only BCMA and TACI, not BAFF-R.

Belimumab reduces the number of circulating B cells, but anti-CD20 monoclonal antibodies reduce the number even more. It is possible that belimumab binds primarily to circulating soluble BAFF and therefore does not induce the antibody-dependent cellular cytotoxicity that could be expected from this IgG1-type antibody..

== History ==
B-cell activating factor is a naturally occurring protein that was discovered by researchers from National Jewish Health (previously the National Jewish Medical and Research Center) and the University of Colorado, who jointly published a paper detailing their findings in May 1999 and named the protein TALL-1. The same protein was named BAFF in another paper published in June 1999, and in a paper published in July of that year, Human Genome Sciences (HGS) referred to it as BLyS (short for B lymphocyte stimulator). Six years later, research showing the key role of BLyS in B cell differentiation, survival, and activation was published.

In October 2000, HGS and Cambridge Antibody Technology (CAT) agreed to co-develop monoclonal antibodies targeted at BLyS. Under this agreement, CAT would identify antibodies and HGS would select appropriate ones to take into clinical trials. In 2003, CAT researchers reported that, by using phage display technology, they had elicited an array of more than 1,000 distinct antibodies, half of which inhibited binding of BLyS to its receptor. Later that year, one of these antibodies was isolated and characterized. It was named LymphoStat-B and subsequently called belimumab.

In August 2006, HGS and GlaxoSmithKline (GSK) entered into a co-development and commercialization agreement under which HGS would conduct Phase III trials for belimumab with assistance from GSK. The companies would share equally in Phase III/IV development costs, sales and marketing expenses, and profits of any product commercialized under the agreement. On 13 February 2007, HGS and GSK announced the initiation of the first of two Phase III clinical trials of belimumab in patients with active lupus erythematosus.

Two Phase III clinical studies were conducted, involving a total of 1,684 patients with scores of ≥6 on the SELENA-SLEDAI assessment of lupus activity. The primary end point was a reduction of ≥4 on the SELENA-SLEDAI assessment, and several other factors, after 52 weeks. Belimumab significantly improved the response rate, reduced disease activity and severe flares, and was well tolerated. Among patients treated with belimumab (10mg/kg) in addition to standard therapy, 58% had SELENA-SLEDAI scores reduced by ≥4 points over 52 weeks, compared with 46% of patients treated with placebo. However, patients of African-American or African descent did not respond significantly to belimumab.

These trials did not include patients with the most severe forms of systemic lupus erythematosus, which involve active damage to the kidneys or central nervous system. Subjects with active kidney disease were included in Phase II trials.

Clinical trials found belimumab to be safe in treating systemic lupus erythematosus, but the magnitude of benefit was small, and Phase III trials excluded the most severe cases of systemic lupus erythematosus, involving kidney and brain damage. Reviewers at the US Food and Drug Administration (FDA) expressed concern that the drug was only "marginally" effective, and that there were more deaths in the treatment group. Defenders said that in addition to its modest efficiency, belimumab allowed patients to significantly reduce their use of corticosteroids.

Belimumab was not effective in Phase II clinical trials for rheumatoid arthritis. It was moderately effective in Phase II trials for Sjögren syndrome.

In December 2020, belimumab was approved by the FDA as a treatment for lupus nephritis in combination with standard treatment.

== Society and culture ==
=== Legal status ===
Under the brand name Benlysta, belimumab received FDA approval for the treatment of systemic lupus erythematosus in March 2011, despite concerns among advisory committee members that the improvement of 4 points on the SELENA-SLEDA scale was marginal, and despite reservations about additional deaths in the treatment group. It was subsequently approved in Canada and the European Union as well.

In February 2023, belimumab was given orphan drug designation by the FDA for the potential treatment of systemic sclerosis.

=== Economics ===
Belimumab is primarily used in people with systemic lupus erythematosus. When it was introduced in 2011, it was the first new drug approved to treat lupus in 56 years. Sales rose to $31.2 million in the first quarter of 2012.

The total cost for the first year of treatment with belimumab is $28,000. Belimumab is much more expensive than other drugs used to treat lupus, including prednisone ($140 per year), hydroxychloroquine ($132), oral methotrexate ($432), azathioprine ($468), and mycophenolate mofetil ($1,224).

In the United Kingdom, the National Institute for Health and Care Excellence calculated the cost of belimumab at £61,200 per quality-adjusted life year (QALY). This is more than the normally accepted cost of £20,000 to £30,000 per QALY. The manufacturer offered the UK National Health Service a discount of a confidential amount, which still did not bring it into the acceptable range.

== Research ==
Blisibimod, an inhibitor of both soluble and membrane-bound BAFF, has demonstrated similar reductions of B cells in clinical trials and is being investigated in a Phase II clinical study for patients with lupus.

BR3-Fc, a recombinant fusion protein built with the extracellular ligand-binding portion of BAFF-R, blocks activation of this receptor by BLyS and is in early-stage pharmaceutical development.

Rituximab, an anti-CD20 monoclonal antibody, has been approved for some indications. Ocrelizumab, ofatumumab, and "third-generation" anti-CD20 monoclonals are in development.

Other drugs addressing B lymphocyte hyperactivity include atacicept, a recombinant fusion protein that is built with the extracellular ligand binding portion of TACI and blocks activation of TACI by APRIL and BLyS. It failed a Phase II trial for multiple sclerosis.
