= Sibeprenlimab =

Medication

Monoclonal antibody
- Type: Whole antibody
- Source: Humanized
- Target: A proliferation-inducing ligand (TNFSF13)

Clinical data
- Trade names: Voyxact
- Other names: VIS-649, sibeprenlimab-szsi
- AHFS/Drugs.com: Monograph
- MedlinePlus: a626008
- License data: US DailyMed: Sibeprenlimab
- Routes of administration: Subcutaneous
- ATC code: L04AG18 (WHO)

Legal status
- Legal status: US: ℞-only

Identifiers
- CAS Number: 2382896-07-1
- DrugBank: DB18919
- UNII: GHX28QZ7DD
- KEGG: D12374

Chemical and physical data
- Formula: C_{6488}H_{10002}N_{1744}O_{2013}S_{52}
- Molar mass: 146310.70 g·mol^{−1}

Sibeprenlimab, sold under the brand name Voyxact, is a humanized monoclonal antibody used for the treatment of immunoglobulin A nephropathy. It is an a proliferation-inducing ligand (APRIL) blocker. It is given by injection under the skin (subcutaneous).

The most common side effects include infections (including upper respiratory tract infection) and injection site reactions, including injection site erythema (skin redness).

Sibeprenlimab was approved for medical use in the United States in November 2025. The US Food and Drug Administration considers it to be a first-in-class medication.

== Medical uses ==
Sibeprenlimab is indicated to reduce proteinuria in adults with primary immunoglobulin A nephropathy at risk for disease progression.

Immunoglobulin A nephropathy is a serious kidney disease that occurs when an abnormal form of an antibody called immunoglobulin A deposits in the kidneys, causing kidney inflammation and damage. This kidney damage can cause protein to leak into the urine (proteinuria) and progressive kidney function decline. The disease is often diagnosed in young adults and can progress to kidney failure.

== Mechanism of action ==
Sibeprenlimab blocks the action of a proliferation-inducing ligand (APRIL), which is implicated in the development of IgA nephropathy, which is mediated through four consecutive processes. APRIL mediates autoimmunity during the last step through binding to transmembrane activator and calcium-modulating cyclophilin ligand interactor. It then causes B cells to produce autoantigen complexes, which are deposited in the glomerular mesangium. Moreover, APRIL, by interaction with B-cell maturation antigen receptors, increases plasma cell survival rate, further enhancing the damaging role of these autoantigens. Sibeprenlimab decreases levels of all types of immunoglobulins (IgA, IgG and IgM, including disease-specific IgA autoantigen) connected with the disease.

In genome-wide association studies, APRIL was selected as a susceptibility gene for IgA nephropathy.

== Side effects ==
The most common side effects include infections (including upper respiratory tract infection) and injection site reactions, including injection site erythema.

== History ==
The efficacy and safety of sibeprenlimab were evaluated in a randomized, double-blind, placebo-controlled trial (NCT05248646) in adults with biopsy-confirmed immunoglobulin A nephropathy. Half of the participants received sibeprenlimab, and the other half received a placebo. The primary efficacy endpoint assessed the change from baseline in proteinuria (urine protein-to-creatinine ratio sampled from a 24-hour urine collection) after nine months of treatment in the first 320 participants who had the opportunity to reach the month nine visit. At nine months, participants in the sibeprenlimab group had a 50% reduction in proteinuria as compared to a 2% increase in proteinuria in the placebo group.

The US Food and Drug Administration granted the application for sibeprenlimab accelerated approval based on the reduction of proteinuria along with priority review and breakthrough therapy designations.

== Society and culture ==
=== Legal status ===
Sibeprenlimab was approved for medical use in the United States in November 2025.

=== Names ===
Sibeprenlimab is the international nonproprietary name.

Sibeprenlimab is sold under the brand name Voyxact.
