= Varespladib =

Investigational drug

Clinical data
- Pregnancy category: —
- ATC code: none

Legal status
- Legal status: investigational

Identifiers
- IUPAC name: 2-(1-benzyl-2-ethyl-3-oxamoyl-1H-indol-4-yl)oxyacetic acid
- CAS Number: 172732-68-2; Methyl ester: 172733-08-3
- PubChem CID: 155815
- ChemSpider: 137248
- UNII: 2Q3P98DATH
- KEGG: D08107
- ChEBI: CHEBI:189668
- ChEMBL: ChEMBL148674
- CompTox Dashboard (EPA): DTXSID50169378

Chemical and physical data
- Formula: C_{21}H_{20}N_{2}O_{5}
- Molar mass: 380.400 g·mol^{−1}
- 3D model (JSmol): Interactive image
- SMILES: CCc1c(C(=O)C(N)=O)c2c(OCC(=O)O)cccc2n1Cc1ccccc1
- InChI: InChI=1S/C21H20N2O5/c1-2-14-19(20(26)21(22)27)18-15(9-6-10-16(18)28-12-17(24)25)23(14)11-13-7-4-3-5-8-13/h3-10H,2,11-12H2,1H3,(H2,22,27)(H,24,25); Key:BHLXTPHDSZUFHR-UHFFFAOYSA-N

Varespladib is an inhibitor of the IIa, V, and X isoforms of secretory phospholipase A2 (sPLA2). The molecule acts as an anti-inflammatory agent by disrupting the first step of the arachidonic acid pathway of inflammation. From 2006 to 2012, varespladib was under active investigation by Anthera Pharmaceuticals as a potential therapy for several inflammatory diseases, including acute coronary syndrome and acute chest syndrome. The trial was halted in March 2012 due to inadequate efficacy. The selective sPLA2 inhibitor varespladib (IC50 value 0.009 μM in chromogenic assay, mole fraction 7.3X10-6) was studied in the VISTA-16 randomized clinical trial (clinicaltrials.gov Identifier: NCT01130246) and the results were published in 2014. The sPLA2 inhibition by varespladib in this setting seemed to be potentially harmful, and thus not a useful strategy for reducing adverse cardiovascular outcomes from acute coronary syndrome. Since 2016, scientific research has focused on the use of varespladib as an inhibitor of snake venom toxins using various types of in vitro and in vivo models. Varespladib showed a significant inhibitory effect to snake venom PLA_{2} which makes it a potential first-line drug candidate in snakebite envenomation therapy. In 2019, the U.S. Food and Drug Administration (FDA) granted varespladib orphan drug status for its potential to treat snakebite.

== History ==
Varespladib methyl was originally developed jointly by Eli Lilly and Company and Shionogi & Co., Ltd., and was acquired by Anthera Pharmaceuticals in 2006.

A Phase II study demonstrated selective sPLA2 inhibition as well as statistically significant anti-inflammatory responses and reductions in LDL cholesterol levels. Two other Phase II trials, conducted in patients with coronary artery disease, found significant decreases in sPLA2 and LDL cholesterol levels, as well as C-reactive protein (CRP) and other inflammatory biomarkers. Varespladib methyl has also been shown to further reduce LDL and inflammatory biomarker levels when administered in conjunction with a cholesterol lowering statin therapy.

In 2010, a Phase III study entitled VISTA-16 was initiated to evaluate the safety and efficacy of short-term treatment with varespladib methyl in subjects with ACS. The trial was halted in March 2012 due to insufficient efficacy. On November 18, 2013, an excess of myocardial infarctions, and of the composite endpoint of cardiovascular mortality, myocardial infarctions and stroke in the VISTA-16 study were reported.

First report on its efficacy as an antidote for snake venoms comes from 2016. Due to oral bioavailability it is considered as a potential first-line field-treatment for snakebite envenomation, which could be applied before provision of definitive medical care.

== Oral varespladib ==
Varespladib methyl

Clinical data
- Other names: A-002
- Pregnancy category: -
- Routes of administration: Oral
- ATC code: none

Legal status
- Legal status: Investigational

Identifiers
- CAS Number: 172733-08-3
- PubChem CID: 9886917
- ChemSpider: 8062590
- UNII: 0NB98NBX3D
- CompTox Dashboard (EPA): DTXSID50169378

Chemical and physical data
- Formula: C_{22}H_{22}N_{2}O_{5}
- Molar mass: 394.427 g·mol^{−1}
- 3D model (JSmol): Interactive image
- SMILES: CCc1c(C(=O)C(N)=O)c2c(OCC(=O)OC)cccc2n1Cc1ccccc1
- InChI: InChI=1S/C22H22N2O5/c1-3-15-20(21(26)22(23)27)19-16(24(15)12-14-8-5-4-6-9-14)10-7-11-17(19)29-13-18(25)28-2/h4-11H,3,12-13H2,1-2H3,(H2,23,27); Key:VJYDOJXJUCJUHL-UHFFFAOYSA-N

Varespladib methyl (also known as A-002, formerly LY333013 and S-3013) is a secretory phospholipase A2 (sPLA2) inhibitor formerly under development by Anthera Pharmaceuticals as a treatment for acute coronary syndrome (ACS). Varespladib methyl is an orally bioavailable prodrug of the molecule varespladib. From 2006 to 2012, varespladib methyl was under active investigation by Anthera Pharmaceuticals as a potential therapy for several inflammatory diseases, including acute coronary syndrome. In March 2012, Anthera halted further investigation of varespladib per a recommendation from an independent Data Safety Monitoring Board. Varespladib and varespladib methyl were characterised as effective molecules in neutralization of snakes venoms and are under experimental evaluation.

== Intravenous varespladib ==
Varespladib sodium

Clinical data
- Other names: A-001
- Pregnancy category: —
- Routes of administration: IV
- ATC code: none

Legal status
- Legal status: Investigational

Identifiers
- CAS Number: 172733-42-5
- PubChem CID: 23674730
- ChemSpider: 137249
- UNII: F6M52CDT0W
- KEGG: D06283
- ChEMBL: ChEMBL2107809
- CompTox Dashboard (EPA): DTXSID50169378

Chemical and physical data
- Formula: C_{21}H_{19}N_{2}NaO_{5}
- Molar mass: 402.382 g·mol^{−1}
- 3D model (JSmol): Interactive image
- SMILES: CCC1=C(C2=C(N1CC3=CC=CC=C3)C=CC=C2OCC(=O)[O-])C(=O)C(=O)N.[Na+]
- InChI: InChI=1S/C21H20N2O5.Na/c1-2-14-19(20(26)21(22)27)18-15(9-6-10-16(18)28-12-17(24)25)23(14)11-13-7-4-3-5-8-13;/h3-10H,2,11-12H2,1H3,(H2,22,27)(H,24,25);/q;+1/p-1; Key:XZZUHXILQXLTGV-UHFFFAOYSA-M

Varespladib sodium (also known as A-001, previously LY315920 and S-5920) is a sodium salt of varespladib designed for intravenous delivery. It was under evaluation by Anthera Pharmaceuticals as an anti-inflammatory sPLA2 inhibitor for the prevention of acute chest syndrome (ACS), the leading cause of death for patients with sickle-cell disease.

Elevated serum levels of sPLA2 have been observed in sickle-cell patients preceding and during ACS episodes. This profound elevation in sPLA2 levels is not observed in sickle-cell patients at steady-state or during a vaso-occlusive crisis, or in patients with respiratory diseases such as pneumonia. A reduction in serum sPLA2 levels, for example through blood transfusion, reduces the risk of an ACS, suggesting that sPLA2 plays an important role in the onset of ACS.

Anthera Pharmaceuticals acquired varespladib sodium from Lilly and Shionogi in 2006. In 2007, the U.S. Food and Drug Administration (FDA) granted varespladib sodium orphan drug status for its potential to treat patients with sickle-cell disease, which was later withdrawn. In 2009, Anthera Pharmaceuticals completed a Phase II study of varespladib sodium in subjects with sickle cell disease at risk for ACS.

Inhibitory effect on snake venoms

Snakebite envenomation can cause local tissue damage, with edema, hemorrhage, myonecrosis, and systemic toxic responses, including organ failure. In an early report on inhibition of snake venom toxicities, varespladib, and its orally bioavailable prodrug methyl-varespladib (LY333013) showed strong inhibition of 28 types of svPLA2s from six continents. Varespladib treatment exerted a significant inhibitory effect on snake venom PLA_{2} both in vitro and in vivo. Hemorrhage and myonecrosis initiated by D. acuts, G. halys, N. atra, and B. multicinctus in an animal model were significantly reversed by varespladib. Furthermore, edema in gastrocnemius muscle was also attenuated. The sPLA2 inhibitor, LY315920 (varespladib sodium), and its orally bioavailable prodrug, LY333013 (varespladib methyl) were highly effective in preventing lethality following experimental envenoming by M. fulvius in a porcine animal model.

Considering that some of the toxins of snake venoms are enzymes, the search for low molecular weight enzyme inhibitors that could be safely administered immediately after a snakebite re-focused scientists' attention on varespladib. Its ability to neutralize the enzymatic and toxic activities of three isolated PLA2 toxins (from medically important snakes found in different region around the world) of structural groups I (pseudexin) and II (crotoxin B and myotoxin I) was evaluated. The results obtained showed that varespladib was able to neutralize the in vitro cytotoxic and in vivo myotoxic activities of purified PLA2s of both the structural group I (pseudexin) and II (myotoxin-I and crotoxin B), however further detailed analysis are needed. Varespladib also effectively inhibited the non-enzymatic myotoxic activity of the snake venom PLA2-like protein (MjTX-II). Co-crystallization of varespladib with MjTX-II toxin revealed that the compound binds to a hydrophobic channel of the protein. Such interaction blocks fatty acids binding, thus inhibiting allosteric activation of the toxin. This leads to the toxin losing its ability to disrupt cell membranes.

In 2019, the U.S. Food and Drug Administration (FDA) designated varespladib orphan drug status for its potential to treat snakebite, without being FDA approved for Orphan Indication.

== Mechanism ==
=== Prodrug activation ===
Varespladib methyl, in contrast to varespladib, is orally bioavailable and after absorption from the GI tract, it undergoes rapid ester hydrolysis to the active molecule – varespladib.

=== sPLA2 inhibition ===
Increased levels of sPLA2 have been observed in patients with cardiovascular disease, and may lead to both acute and chronic disease manifestations by promoting vascular inflammation. Plasma levels of sPLA2 can predict coronary events in patients who recently suffered an ACS as well as in those with stable coronary artery disease.

Furthermore, sPLA2 remodels lipoproteins, notably low-density lipoproteins (LDL) and their receptors, which are responsible for removing cholesterol from the body. This remodeling can lead to increased deposition of LDL and cholesterol in the artery wall. In combination with chronic vascular inflammation, these deposits lead to atherosclerosis.

Varespladib inhibits the IIA, V and X isoforms of sPLA2 to reduce inflammation, lower and modulate lipid levels, and reduce levels of C-reactive protein (CRP) and interleukin-6 (IL-6), both indicators of inflammation.

=== Snake venom antidote activity ===
sPLA2 is also present in snake venoms and implicated in their toxicity. It plays a role in the morbidity and mortality from snakebite envenomations, triggering induced cell lysis, disrupted hemostasis, and diminished oxygen transport, as well as myotoxicity and neurotoxicity which can lead to paralysis.

Varespladib methyl, as well as varespladib, were found to be inhibitors of the sPLA2 of snake venoms. Varespladib methyl was less potent than varespladib. Both showed activity against a broad spectrum of different snake venoms originating from six continents. They protected rodents against neurotoxicity and hemostatic toxicity, increasing survival of envenomed animals.

Varespladib also effectively inhibited in vitro and in vivo the non-enzymatic myotoxic activity of snake venom's PLA2-like protein (MjTX-II). Co-crystallization of varespladib with MjTX-II toxin (PDB code: 6PWH) revealed that the drug binds to a hydrophobic channel of the protein. This blocks fatty acids from binding there, thus inhibiting their allosteric activation of the toxin, thereby impairing its ability to disrupt cell membranes.
