= Serum B-cell maturation antigen =

Cleaved form of B-cell maturation antigen

TNFRSF17
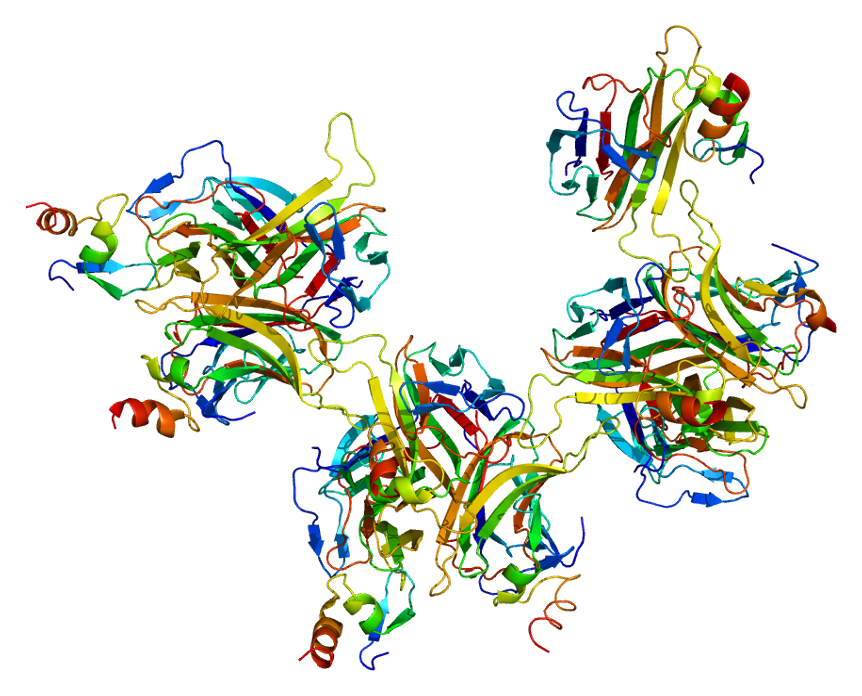

Identifiers
- Aliases: TNFRSF17, BCM, BCMA, CD269, TNFRSF13A, tumor necrosis factor receptor superfamily member 17, TNF receptor superfamily member 17
- External IDs: OMIM: 109545; MGI: 1343050; GeneCards: TNFRSF17
Available structures
PDB	Ortholog search: PDBe RCSB
PDB	List of PDB id codes 1OQD, 1XU2, 2KN1, 4ZFO

Gene location (Human)
Chr.	Chromosome 16 (human)
Band	16p13.13	Start	11,965,210 bp
Band	16p13.13	End	11,968,068 bp

Gene location (Mouse)
Chr.	Chromosome 16 (mouse)
Band	16|16 A1	Start	11,131,676 bp
Band	16|16 A1	End	11,137,938 bp
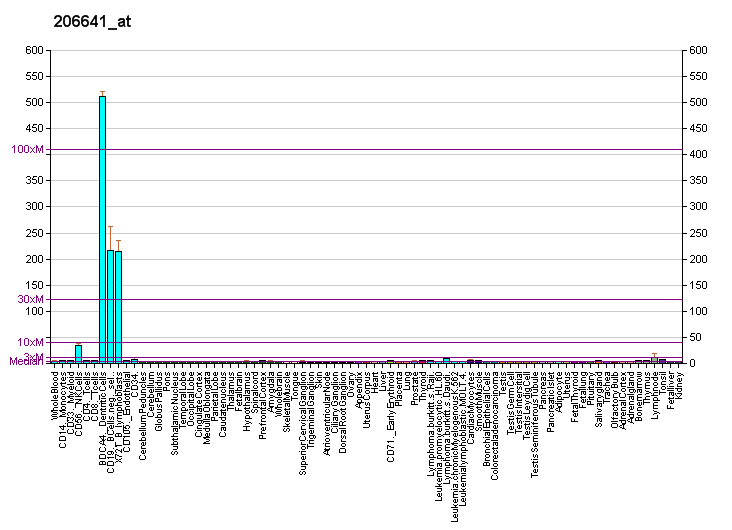
RNA expression pattern
Bgee	Human / Mouse (ortholog); Top expressed in: rectum; mucosa of transverse colon; jejunal mucosa; mucosa of sigmoid colon; testicle; lymph node; epithelium of nasopharynx; appendix; spleen; duodenum / Top expressed in: blastocyst; morula; duodenum; jejunum; spleen; lip; thymus; secondary oocyte; colon; ileum; More reference expression data
BioGPS	More reference expression data
Gene ontology
Molecular function	signaling receptor activity
Cellular component	endomembrane system; plasma membrane; membrane; integral component of membrane
Biological process	multicellular organism development; tumor necrosis factor-mediated signaling pathway; lymphocyte homeostasis; cell population proliferation; immune system process; adaptive immune response; signal transduction
Sources:Amigo / QuickGO
Orthologs
Databases	NCBI: entry; OMA: entry
Species	Human	Mouse
Entrez	608	21935
Ensembl	ENSG00000048462	ENSMUSG00000022496
UniProt	Q02223	O88472
RefSeq (mRNA)	NM_001192	NM_011608
RefSeq (protein)	NP_001183	NP_035738
Location (UCSC)	Chr 16: 11.97 – 11.97 Mb	Chr 16: 11.13 – 11.14 Mb
PubMed search
- Wikidata
View/Edit Human	View/Edit Mouse

Serum B-cell maturation antigen (sBCMA) is the cleaved form of B-cell maturation antigen (BCMA), found at low levels in the serum of normal patients and generally elevated in patients with multiple myeloma (MM). Changes in sBCMA levels have been found to correlate with a MM patient's clinical status in response to treatment.

== Role in biology ==
BCMA is a member of the tumor necrosis factor receptor family, expressed on the cell surface of maturing plasma cells and is involved in supporting normal survival of long-lived plasma cells, production of antibodies, and class switching of immunoglobulins. In MM, BCMA promotes the proliferation and survival of MM cells and is associated with the immunosuppression which is the hallmark of MM. The BCMA molecule is the receptor for APRIL (a proliferation-inducing ligand) and BAFF (B-cell activating factor, also known as BLyS). The binding of APRIL and BAFF to the membrane bound form of BCMA stimulates B-cell proliferation and antibody production. The membrane bound BCMA can be cleaved by gamma secretase, resulting in sBCMA, and released into the blood.

== Clinical significance ==
Serum BCMA is found at low levels in the serum or plasma of normal patients and is generally elevated in patients with MM. sBCMA levels have been found to correlate with the severity of myeloma disease and shown to be predictive of response to therapy. Progression free survival (PFS) and overall survival (OS) in MM patients have also correlated with levels of sBCMA. Changes in sBCMA also correlate with changes in disease status among MM patients. In addition to MM, sBCMA also appears to correlate with disease progression in monoclonal gammopathy of undetermined significance (MGUS), smoldering myeloma (SMM) and in chronic lymphocytic leukemia (CLL).

=== As a biomarker ===
When BCMA is cleaved from the cell membrane of plasma cells by gamma secretase, a ubiquitous intramembranous protease enzyme, it is solubilized in the serum, where it can accumulate and bind to various targets including BAFF and APRIL. Patients with MM generally have higher levels of sBCMA. Solubilized BCMA can sequester BAFF, preventing it from signaling B cells, resulting in reduced polyclonal antibody levels in patients with MM. In multiple studies, sBCMA levels have been found to correlate with the severity of myeloma. Notably, sBCMA levels are predictive of response to therapy, PFS and OS. In addition, changes in sBCMA predict changes in clinical status more rapidly than conventional markers that are used to track MM patients. For this reason, the biomarker has been used in diagnostic evaluation of myeloma and other B-cell disorders.

=== In therapeutics ===
sBCMA can bind to anti-BCMA antibodies used as therapeutics in treating MM. It has been shown that the high levels of BCMA present in the serum of MM patients can inhibit the effectiveness of BCMA-directed therapy. For this reason, the gamma secretase enzyme has been the target of some recent drug therapies. These drugs aim to inhibit the action of the gamma secretase enzyme, thus both increasing the density of BCMA on the MM cell while at the same time lowering the levels of sBCMA in the blood and allowing anti-BCMA antibodies to more effectively bind to the target cells.

=== In diagnostics ===
sBCMA has been measured and evaluated using enzyme-linked immunosorbent assays (ELISAs) in numerous investigational studies of MM related B-cell diseases. Although still investigational, sBCMA appears to be a novel biomarker to track MM such as M-protein and serum Free Light Chain (FLC). All three biomarkers are generally elevated on initial evaluation of MM, tend to increase as the severity of disease increases, and decrease as patients respond to therapy.

Because levels of the biomarkers appear to correlate with disease severity, they have been used in diagnostics as a way to monitor patients' disease and evaluate response to therapy. Preliminary investigations have indicated that sBCMA, unlike M protein or FLC, is independent of the patient's kidney function, and may offer an advantage to monitoring those patients.

Additionally, sBCMA is expressed in non-secretory MM, a subset of MM in which patients do not express high enough levels of M protein or SFLC to be accurately followed using these two biomarkers. These patientsgenerally need to undergo bone marrow biopsies frequently to evaluate their status. The sBCMA biomarker may offer an alternative means to evaluate this subset of patients.

=== In related diseases ===
Levels of sBCMA appear to progressively increase along the spectrum of plasma cell-related disorders. Serum BCMA is increased in patients with active MM compared with healthy controls. Levels of sBCMA were determined in 196 healthy subjects and showed a right-tailed distribution with a median value of 37.51 ng/mL with a standard deviation of 22.54 ng/mL (range 18.78 -180.39 ng/mL). Among patients with MM, sBCMA levels correlated with the percentage of malignant cells, giving rise to the concept that sBCMA may reflect a patient's tumor burden.

Levels of sBCMA among patients with MM were elevated when compared with healthy controls (P<0.0001) and those with monoclonal gammopathy of undetermined significance (MGUS) (P=0.0157). Furthermore, sBCMA levels were significantly higher among patients with smoldering multiple myeloma (SMM) and untreated active MM patients than healthy donors (P<0.0001).

In a retrospective study of MGUS and SMM patients, the highest levels of sBCMA were observed among patients with SMM who progressed to MM, intermediate levels were seen in patients with MGUS who progressed to MM, and lowest baseline levels were found among patients with MGUS who did not progress to MM. The change in sBCMA over time was lowest in the non-progressing patients with MGUS.

Sometimes, MM patients show undetectable levels of monoclonal immunoglobulin (M protein) in the serum or urine. For this reason, these patients are generally monitored using bone marrow biopsies and PET CT scans. It has been found, however, that sBCMA can be reliably measured in these patients, and correlates well with disease activity and changes in their PET scans and the percentage of bone marrow plasma cells during the course of disease.

=== In response to treatment ===
sBCMA has been investigated among MM patients undergoing numerous treatment regiments. Changes in sBCMA levels were found to correlate with changes in an individual patient's clinical status in response to treatment for MM.

Additionally, sBCMA levels were significantly higher among patients with progressive disease than in patients with disease responsive to treatment (P=0.0038). Interestingly, sBCMA levels correlated with response to treatment, independent of the type of treatment.

Among patients starting new treatment, changes in sBCMA levels from baseline to one week later (cycle 1 day 8) were found to predict PFS, with >25% increase or decrease in serum BCMA levels on cycle 1 day 8 indicating a much shorter or longer time on treatment, respectively.

=== As predictor of progression free survival and overall survival ===
Serum BCMA levels have been reported to predict both PFS and overall survival (OS) in MM.

In a study by Ghermezi et al., sBCMA levels were predictive of PFS and OS among patients with MM. PFS was significantly longer for patients with sBCMA levels below the median (326.4 ng/mL) versus those with levels above the median (median, 9.0 vs 3.6 months; P=0.0006). Similarly, OS was significantly longer among those with sBCMA levels below the median compared with those above (median, 155 vs 96 months; P =0.0108).

MM patients with sBCMA levels above the median had significantly shorter survival compared with patients with levels below the median concentration (P=0.0014). Patients in the highest quartile showed a markedly shortened survival compared with the remainder of the patients (P=0.0003).

In a prospective Phase 1 trial of sBCMA to predict clinical outcomes among patients with relapsed or refractory MM treated with lenalidomide, ruxolitinib and methylprednisolone, baseline sBCMA levels were found to be predictive of PFS. Specifically, patients with a baseline sBCMA level in the highest quartile (range, 414.7 – 1655.1 ng/mL) had a significantly shorter PFS than those in the lowest three quartiles (range, 10.3 – 318.2 ng/mL; median PFS: 1.12 vs. 6.64 months; P=0.006). In the same prospective Phase 1 trial, changes in sBCMA during the first cycle study treatment accurately predicted patients later best response. Notably, changes in sBCMA occurred more rapidly than changes in either M-protein or FLC.

Studies to further investigate the role of sBCMA in predicting OS and PFS are ongoing.
