= TACI-CRD2 protein domain =

TACI-CRD2
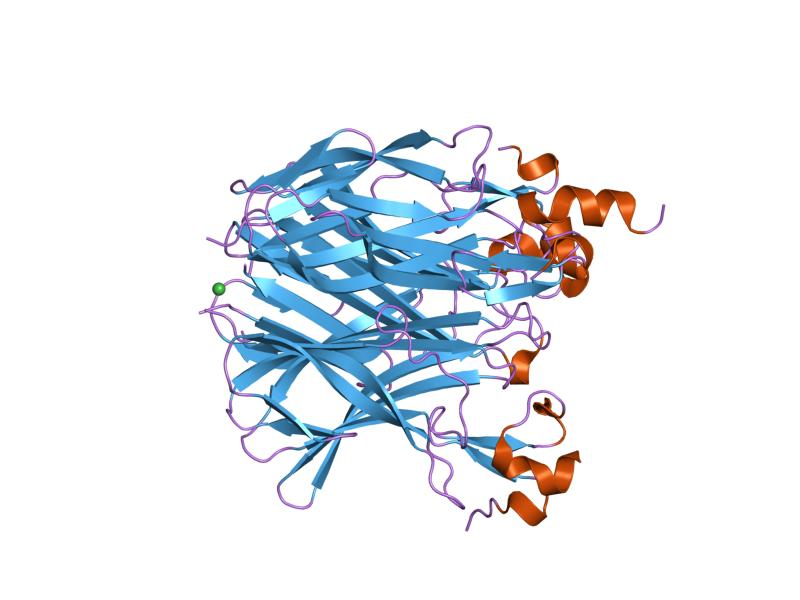
- The crystal structure of APRIL bound to TACI

Identifiers
- Symbol: TACI-CRD2
- Pfam: PF09305
- InterPro: IPR015384
Available protein structures:
- PDB: IPR015384 PF09305 (ECOD; PDBsum)
- AlphaFold: IPR015384; PF09305

In molecular biology, TACI-CRD2 represents the second cysteine-rich protein domain found in the TACI family of proteins. Members of this family are predominantly found in tumour necrosis factor receptor superfamily, member 13b (TACI), and are required for binding to the ligands APRIL and BAFF. TACI-CRD2 stands for Transmembrane Activator and CAML Interactor- Cysteine Rich Domain 2.

== Function ==
TACI functions as a negative regulator of BAFF function given that loss of TACI expression results in the overproduction of B lymphocytes, a type of white blood cell that guards against infection. Cytokines can be grouped into a family on the basis of sequence, functional and structural similarities.

Tumor necrosis factor (TNF) (also known as TNF-alpha or cachectin) is a cytotoxin which is derived from a form of white blood cell called monocytes. It is thought to cause tumour regression, septic shock and cachexia. The protein is synthesised as a prohormone with an unusually long and atypical signal sequence, which is absent from the mature secreted cytokine. A short hydrophobic stretch of amino acids serves to anchor the prohormone in lipid bilayers. Both the mature protein and a partially processed form of the hormone are secreted after cleavage of the propeptide.

There are a number of different families of TNF, but all these cytokines seem to form homotrimeric (or heterotrimeric in the case of LT-alpha/beta) complexes that are recognised by their specific receptors. TACI is a member of the tumor necrosis factor receptor superfamily and has an important role as regulator of B cell function. TACI binds two ligands, APRIL and BAFF, which it binds to with high affinity and contains two cysteine-rich domains (CRDs) in its extracellular region.

== Formation ==
TACI-CRD1 forms TACI-CRD2 by removing the N-terminal cysteine rich domain by alternative splicing. This shorter form is capable of ligand-induced cell signaling and that the second CRD alone (TACI-CRD2) contains full affinity for both ligands.

== Ligands ==
The ligands are type II transmembrane protein cytokines that have various effects on immune cells, including acting as a:

- costimulatory molecules,
- apoptotic agents,
- growth factors

APRIL (also known as TNSF13A, TALL-2, and TRDL-1) is a TNF ligand that is overexpressed by some tumours.
