= Anthera Pharmaceuticals =

American biopharmaceutical company

Anthera Pharmaceuticals, Inc.
- Company type: Public
- Traded as: Nasdaq: ANTH
- Industry: Pharmaceuticals
- Founded: 2004
- Headquarters: Hayward, California, U.S.
- Key people: Craig Thompson (President and CEO)
- Website: Anthera.com

Anthera Pharmaceuticals, Inc. is an American biopharmaceutical company focused on developing and commercializing products to treat serious conditions associated with cystic fibrosis, inflammation and autoimmune diseases. Liprotamase (Sollpura), Anthera's leading drug candidate which is being developed for exocrine pancreatic insufficiency (EPI) is currently in Phase 3 clinical trials, and A-623 (Blisibimod) for the treatment of IgA nephropathy is currently in Phase 2 clinical trial.

== Products ==
=== Blisibimod ===
- Blisibimod is a selective peptibody antagonist of B-cell activating factor (BAFF). BAFF is critical to the development, maintenance and survival of B-cells, but is known to be up-regulated in autoimmune diseases. It is primarily expressed by macrophages, monocytes and dendritic cells. Blisibimod binds to BAFF and inhibits the interaction of BAFF with its receptors. Blisibimod is currently being evaluated in IgA nephropathy.

=== Sollpura ===
In July 2014, Anthera acquired Sollpura (Liprotamase) from Eli Lilly and Company. Sollpura is an investigational pancreatic enzyme replacement therapy (PERT) that uses three biotechnology-derived digestive enzymes intended to treat patients with endocrine pancreatic insufficiency as a result of cystic fibrosis and other diseases.
