= BAFF receptor =

Mammalian protein found in Homo sapiens

TNFRSF13C
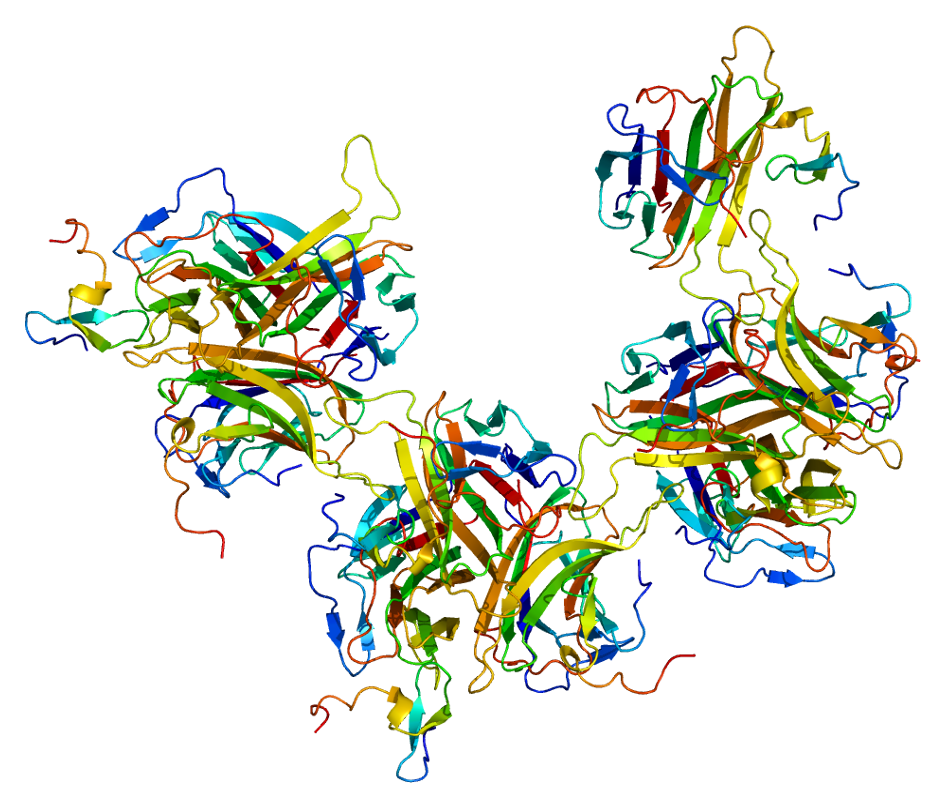

Identifiers
- Aliases: TNFRSF13C, BAFF-R, BAFFR, BROMIX, CD268, CVID4, prolixin, tumor necrosis factor receptor superfamily member 13C, TNF receptor superfamily member 13C
- External IDs: OMIM: 606269; MGI: 1919299; GeneCards: TNFRSF13C
Available structures
PDB	Ortholog search: PDBe RCSB
PDB	List of PDB id codes 1MPV, 1OQE, 1OSX, 2HFG, 3V56, 4V46

Gene location (Human)
Chr.	Chromosome 22 (human)
Band	22q13.2	Start	41,922,032 bp
Band	22q13.2	End	41,926,806 bp

Gene location (Mouse)
Chr.	Chromosome 15 (mouse)
Band	15|15 E1	Start	82,105,944 bp
Band	15|15 E1	End	82,108,570 bp
RNA expression pattern
Bgee	Human / Mouse (ortholog); Top expressed in: spleen; lymph node; appendix; bone marrow cell; granulocyte; testicle; blood; tonsil; ventricular zone; mucosa of transverse colon / Top expressed in: mesenteric lymph nodes; spleen; blood; submandibular gland; tunica adventitia of aorta; subcutaneous adipose tissue; tunica media of zone of aorta; morula; lumbar subsegment of spinal cord; granulocyte; More reference expression data
BioGPS	n/a
Orthologs
Databases	NCBI: entry; OMA: entry
Species	Human	Mouse
Entrez	115650	72049
Ensembl	ENSG00000159958	ENSMUSG00000068105
UniProt	Q96RJ3	Q9D8D0
RefSeq (mRNA)	NM_052945	NM_028075; NM_001357758
RefSeq (protein)	NP_443177	NP_082351; NP_001344687
Location (UCSC)	Chr 22: 41.92 – 41.93 Mb	Chr 15: 82.11 – 82.11 Mb
PubMed search
- Wikidata
View/Edit Human	View/Edit Mouse

BAFF receptor (B-cell activating factor receptor, BAFF-R), also known as tumor necrosis factor receptor superfamily member 13C (TNFRSF13C) and BLyS receptor 3 (BR3), is a membrane protein of the TNF receptor superfamily which recognizes BAFF, an essential factor for B cell maturation and survival. In humans it is encoded by the TNFRSF13C gene.

== Function ==
B-cell activating factor (BAFF) enhances B-cell survival in vitro and is a regulator of the peripheral B-cell population. The protein encoded by this gene is a receptor for BAFF and is a type III transmembrane protein containing a single extracellular phenylalanine-rich domain. It is thought that this receptor is the principal receptor required for BAFF-mediated mature B-cell survival. In B cell maturation, due to regulation by BAFF-R, only a limited amount of B-cell will survive.

== Clinical significance ==
Overexpression of BAFF in mice results in mature B-cell hyperplasia and symptoms of systemic lupus erythematosus (SLE). Also, some SLE patients have increased levels of BAFF in serum. Therefore, it has been proposed that abnormally high levels of BAFF may contribute to the pathogenesis of autoimmune diseases by enhancing the survival of autoreactive B cells, which are cells that show immune response to normal body cells. Autoreactive B cells are less sensitive toward BAFF and are usually outcompeted by the normal B cells in the maturation process regulated by low BAFF-R expression. An elevated level of BAFF-R can therefore overcome this decreased response and result in accumulation of autoreactive B cells.

BAFF and BAFF-R pair can also down-regulate the cell apoptosis process.

== See also ==
- B-cell activating factor
- B-cell maturation antigen
