= Blisibimod =

Chemical compound

Clinical data
- Other names: A-623
- ATC code: none

Legal status
- Legal status: Investigational

Identifiers
- CAS Number: 1236126-45-6
- ChemSpider: none
- UNII: 114VP6C6ES
- KEGG: D10311

Chemical and physical data
- Formula: C_{2836}H_{4376}N_{756}O_{858}S_{26}
- Molar mass: 63624.20 g·mol^{−1}

Blisibimod (also known as A-623, formerly AMG 623) is a selective antagonist of B-cell activating factor (BAFF, also known as B-lymphocyte stimulator or BLyS), being developed by Anthera Pharmaceuticals as a treatment for systemic lupus erythematosus. It is currently under active investigation in clinical trials.

== Mechanism of action ==
Blisibimod is a fusion protein consisting of four BAFF binding domains fused to the N-terminus of the fragment crystallizable region (Fc) of a human antibody.

BAFF is involved in B-cell survival, activation, and differentiation. Elevated levels of BAFF have been associated with several B-cell mediated autoimmune diseases, including systemic lupus erythematosus, lupus nephritis, rheumatoid arthritis, multiple sclerosis, Sjögren syndrome, Graves' disease, and Hashimoto's thyroiditis. Blisibimod binds to BAFF and inhibits interaction with BAFF receptors, thus decreasing B-cell survival and proliferation throughout the body. Improvements in disease activity have been observed in patients with systemic lupus erythematosus and rheumatoid arthritis following treatment with BAFF inhibitors in clinical trials.

== Development ==
Blisibimod was initially developed by Amgen, with Phase I trials demonstrating comparable safety between the blisibimod and placebo treatments. It was subsequently acquired by Anthera Pharmaceuticals, who in 2010 initiated a global Phase II study called PEARL-SC to investigate the efficacy, safety, and tolerability of blisibimod in subjects with systemic lupus erythematosus. The PEARL-SC study, completed in April 2012, yielded data that has been published. Blisibimod is currently being tested in a Phase 3 study, CHABLIS-SC1, for systemic lupus erythematosus, and a Phase 2 study, BRIGHT-SC, for IgA nephropathy.
