= Atacicept =

Chemical compound

Clinical data
- Trade names: Trutakna
- Other names: atacicept-vymj
- AHFS/Drugs.com: trutakna
- License data: US DailyMed: Atacicept
- Routes of administration: Subcutaneous
- ATC code: none

Legal status
- Legal status: US: ℞-only

Identifiers
- CAS Number: 845264-92-8
- ChemSpider: none
- UNII: K3D9A0ICQ3
- KEGG: D09704

Chemical and physical data
- Formula: C_{3104}H_{4788}N_{856}O_{950}S_{44}
- Molar mass: 70708.13 g·mol^{−1}

Atacicept, sold under the brand name Trutakna, is a medication used for the treatment of proteinuria in immunoglobulin A nephropathy. It is given via subcutaneous injection (under the skin). Atacicept was developed by Merck KGaA.

Atacicept was approved for medical use in the United States in July 2026. Atacicept is the first medication that targets both B-cell activating factor and a proliferation-inducing ligand (APRIL), which are involved in survival and maturation of certain immune cells. This in turn decreases production of the abnormal immunoglobulin A antibody.

== Medical uses ==
Atacicept is indicated to reduce proteinuria in adults with primary immunoglobulin A nephropathy at risk for disease progression.

Immunoglobulin A nephropathy is a serious kidney disease that occurs when an abnormal form of an immunoglobulin A antibody builds up in the kidneys, causing kidney inflammation and damage. This kidney damage can cause protein to leak from the blood into the urine (proteinuria) and loss of kidney function over time that may progress to kidney failure.

== Pharmacology ==
=== Mechanism of action ===
Atacicept is a fusion protein of the human transmembrane activator, calcium modulator, and cyclophilin ligand interactor (TACI) receptor and the Fc portion of human IgG1 (TACI Fc), which has been modified to reduce Fc receptor-mediated effector functions. This blood-soluble protein can bind two cytokines that regulate maturation, function, and survival of B cells – B-cell activating factor (BAFF) and A proliferation-inducing ligand (APRIL), with the constant region of immunoglobin.

Atacicept is thought to selectively impair mature B cells and plasma cells with less impact on progenitor cells and memory B cells.

== Manufacturing ==
Atacicept is produced by recombinant DNA technology in Chinese hamster ovary cells.

== History ==
The efficacy and safety of atacicept were evaluated in a randomized, double-blind, placebo-controlled clinical trial (NCT04716231) in adult participants with biopsy-confirmed IgA nephropathy. Participants were randomly assigned to either atacicept 150 mg injected subcutaneously once weekly or placebo.

== Society and culture ==
=== Legal status ===
Atacicept was approved for medical use in the United States in July 2026. The US Food and Drug Administration (FDA) granted the application for atacicept priority review and breakthrough therapy designations. The FDA granted the approval of Trutakna to Vera Therapeutics.

=== Names ===
Atacicept is the international nonproprietary name.

Atacicept is sold under the brand name Trutakna.
