= Calcium modulating ligand =

Protein-coding gene in humans

CAMLG

Identifiers
- Aliases: CAMLG, CAML, GET2, calcium modulating ligand
- External IDs: OMIM: 601118; MGI: 104728; HomoloGene: 1323; GeneCards: CAMLG; OMA:CAMLG - orthologs

Gene location (Human)
Chr.	Chromosome 5 (human)
Band	5q31.1	Start	134,738,495 bp
Band	5q31.1	End	134,752,157 bp

Gene location (Mouse)
Chr.	Chromosome 13 (mouse)
Band	13 B1|13 30.06 cM	Start	55,770,818 bp
Band	13 B1|13 30.06 cM	End	55,780,224 bp
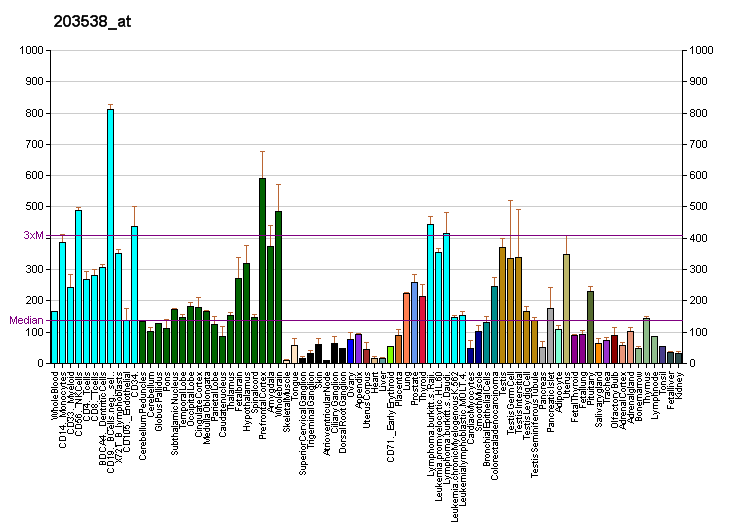
RNA expression pattern
Bgee	Human / Mouse (ortholog); Top expressed in: secondary oocyte; sperm; Brodmann area 23; cartilage tissue; ganglionic eminence; trigeminal ganglion; Achilles tendon; superior vestibular nucleus; nipple; Brodmann area 9 / Top expressed in: medial ganglionic eminence; spermatocyte; condyle; neural layer of retina; fossa; facial motor nucleus; saccule; substantia nigra; trigeminal ganglion; ventricular zone; More reference expression data
BioGPS	More reference expression data
Gene ontology
Molecular function	protein binding; cell adhesion molecule binding; ubiquitin protein ligase binding
Cellular component	integral component of membrane; endoplasmic reticulum; membrane; cytoplasm
Biological process	defense response; viral process; receptor recycling; epidermal growth factor receptor signaling pathway; signal transduction; negative regulation of protein ubiquitination; negative regulation of proteasomal ubiquitin-dependent protein catabolic process; protein stabilization
Sources:Amigo / QuickGO
Orthologs
Species	Human	Mouse
Entrez	819	12328
Ensembl	ENSG00000164615	ENSMUSG00000021501
UniProt	P49069	P49070
RefSeq (mRNA)	NM_001745	NM_007596
RefSeq (protein)	NP_001736	NP_031622
Location (UCSC)	Chr 5: 134.74 – 134.75 Mb	Chr 13: 55.77 – 55.78 Mb
PubMed search
- Wikidata
View/Edit Human	View/Edit Mouse

Calcium modulating ligand (CAMLG or CAML), also known as calcium-modulating cyclophilin ligand, is a signalling protein recognized by the TNF receptor TACI.

== Function ==
The immunosuppressant drug cyclosporin A blocks a calcium-dependent signal from the T-cell receptor (TCR) that normally leads to T-cell activation. When bound to cyclophilin B, cyclosporin A binds and inactivates the key signaling intermediate calcineurin. The protein encoded by this gene functions similarly to cyclosporin A, binding to cyclophilin B and acting downstream of the TCR and upstream of calcineurin by causing an influx of calcium. This integral membrane protein appears to be a new participant in the calcium signal transduction pathway, implicating cyclophilin B in calcium signaling, even in the absence of cyclosporin.

== Interactions ==
CAMLG has been shown to interact with TNFRSF13B.
