= Transmembrane activator and CAML interactor =

Protein-coding gene in the species Homo sapiens

TNFRSF13B
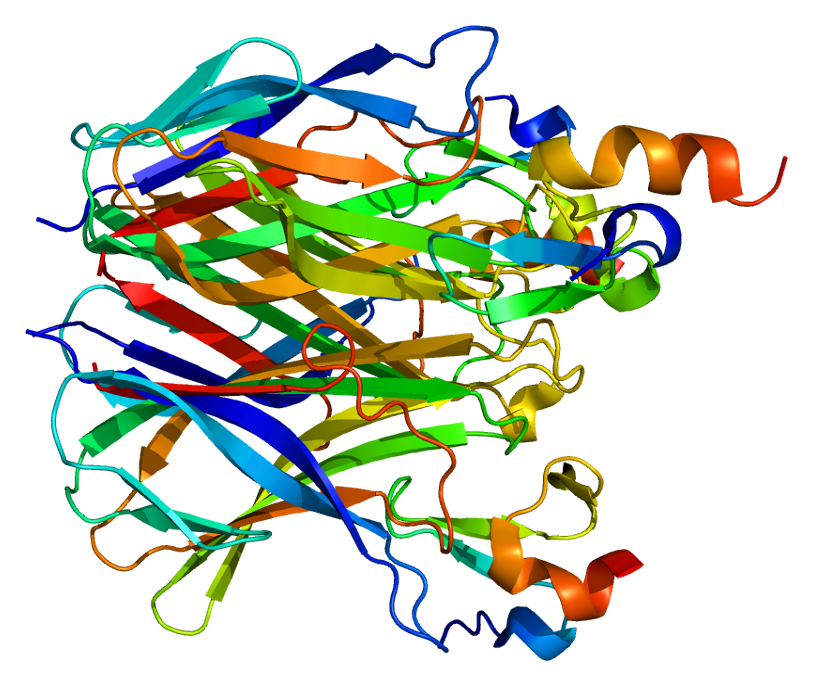

Identifiers
- Aliases: TNFRSF13B, CD267, CVID, CVID2, RYZN, TACI, TNFRSF14B, IGAD2, tumor necrosis factor receptor superfamily member 13B, TNF receptor superfamily member 13B
- External IDs: OMIM: 604907; MGI: 1889411; GeneCards: TNFRSF13B
Available structures
PDB	Ortholog search: PDBe RCSB
PDB	List of PDB id codes 1XU1, 1XUT

Gene location (Human)
Chr.	Chromosome 17 (human)
Band	17p11.2	Start	16,929,816 bp
Band	17p11.2	End	16,972,118 bp

Gene location (Mouse)
Chr.	Chromosome 11 (mouse)
Band	11|11 B2	Start	61,017,581 bp
Band	11|11 B2	End	61,040,198 bp
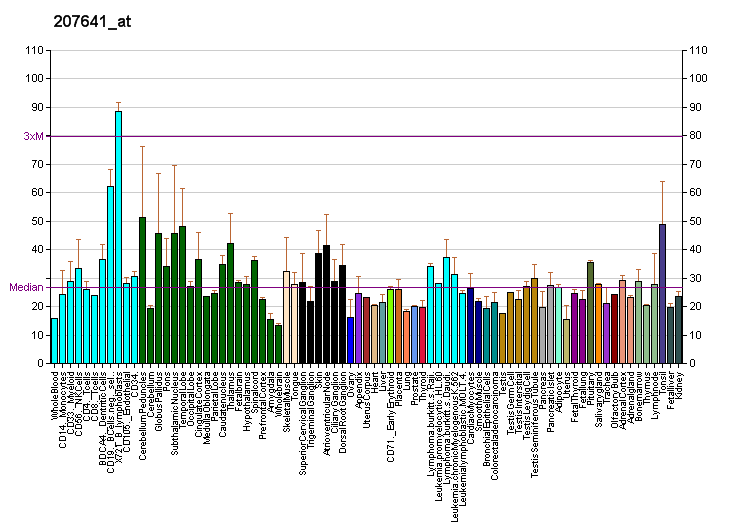
RNA expression pattern
Bgee	Human / Mouse (ortholog); Top expressed in: spleen; apex of heart; lymph node; tendon of biceps brachii; muscle of thigh; bone marrow cell; gastrocnemius muscle; cecum; appendix; parotid gland / Top expressed in: spleen; mesenteric lymph nodes; bone marrow; blood; thymus; stroma of bone marrow; granulocyte; tibiofemoral joint; subcutaneous adipose tissue; embryo; More reference expression data
BioGPS	More reference expression data
Gene ontology
Molecular function	protein binding; signaling receptor activity
Cellular component	integral component of membrane; integral component of plasma membrane; membrane; plasma membrane
Biological process	cell surface receptor signaling pathway; tumor necrosis factor-mediated signaling pathway; adaptive immune response; immune system process; B cell homeostasis; hematopoietic progenitor cell differentiation; negative regulation of B cell proliferation
Sources:Amigo / QuickGO
Orthologs
Databases	NCBI: entry; OMA: entry
Species	Human	Mouse
Entrez	23495	57916
Ensembl	ENSG00000240505	ENSMUSG00000010142
UniProt	O14836	Q9ET35
RefSeq (mRNA)	NM_012452	NM_021349
RefSeq (protein)	NP_036584	NP_067324
Location (UCSC)	Chr 17: 16.93 – 16.97 Mb	Chr 11: 61.02 – 61.04 Mb
PubMed search
- Wikidata
View/Edit Human	View/Edit Mouse

Transmembrane activator and CAML interactor (TACI), also known as tumor necrosis factor receptor superfamily member 13B (TNFRSF13B) is a protein that in humans is encoded by the TNFRSF13B gene.

TNFRSF13B is a transmembrane protein of the TNF receptor superfamily found predominantly on the surface of B cells, which are an important part of the immune system. TACI recognizes three ligands: APRIL, BAFF and CAML.

== Function ==
TACI is a lymphocyte-specific member of the tumor necrosis factor (TNF) receptor superfamily. It was originally discovered because of its ability to interact with calcium-modulator and cyclophilin ligand (CAML). TACI was later found to play a crucial role in humoral immunity by interacting with two members of the TNF family: B-cell activating factor (BAFF) and a proliferation-inducing ligand (APRIL). These proteins signal through TACI inducing activation of several transcription factors including NFAT, AP-1, and NF-kappa-B which then modulate cellular activities. Defects in the function of TACI can lead to immune system diseases and has shown to cause fatal autoimmunity in mice.

TACI controls T cell-independent B cell antibody responses, isotype switching, and B cell homeostasis.

== Clinical significance ==
TACI mutations are associated with immunodeficiency in humans, as a significant proportion of common variable immunodeficiency (CVID) patients have TACI mutations. People with this condition produce abnormally low amounts of antibodies, which are needed for protection against infections.

In humans, the gene encoding this protein is located within the Smith–Magenis syndrome region on chromosome 17.

TACI is currently being targeted for autoimmunity and B cell malignancies via atacicept, a recombinant fusion protein that binds the TACI ligands BAFF and APRIL.

== Interactions ==
TNFRSF13B has been shown to interact with B-cell activating factor, TRAF6, TRAF5, TNFSF13, TRAF2 and CAMLG.
