= Acute chest syndrome =

Potentially lethal blockage of lung vasculature in sickle cell anaemia

- Specialty: Pulmonology

Acute chest syndrome is a vaso-occlusive crisis of the pulmonary vasculature commonly seen in people with sickle cell anemia. This condition commonly manifests with a new opacification of the lung(s) on a chest x-ray.

== Signs and symptoms ==
The crisis is a common complication in sickle-cell patients and can be associated with one or more symptoms including fever, cough, excruciating pain, sputum production, shortness of breath, or low oxygen levels.

== Various Etiologies ==
Acute chest syndrome is often precipitated by a lung infection, and the resulting inflammation and loss of oxygen saturation leads to further sickling of red cells, thus exacerbating pulmonary and systemic hypoxemia, sickling, and vaso-occlusion.

In addition to lung infection as a possible etiology of acute chest syndrome, bone marrow fat embolism, atelectasis, pulmonary edema, or sickle cell aggregation in the intrapulmonary vasculature can precipitate acute chest syndrome. While the instigating factor may not be readily apparent at onset, one distinctive lab value that may set acute chest syndrome from various other causes include a precipitous drop in hemoglobin way below the patient's baseline.

== Diagnosis ==
The diagnosis of acute chest syndrome is made difficult by its similarity in presentation with pneumonia. Both may present with a new opacification of the lung on chest x-ray. The presence of fevers, low oxygen levels in the blood, increased respiratory rate, chest pain, and cough are also common in acute chest syndrome. Diagnostic workup includes chest x-ray, complete cell count, reticulocyte count, ECG, and blood and sputum cultures. Patients may also require additional blood tests or imaging (e.g. a CT scan) to exclude a heart attack or other pulmonary pathology.

== Prevention ==
Hydroxyurea is a medication that can help to prevent acute chest syndrome. It may cause a low white blood cell count, which can predispose the person to some types of infection.

== Treatment ==
Broad spectrum antibiotics to cover common infections such as Streptococcus pneumoniae and mycoplasma, pain control, and blood transfusion. Acute chest syndrome is an indication for exchange transfusion.

Bronchodilators may be useful but have not been well studied.

== Complications ==
Complications associated with acute chest syndrome can be delineated into acute and chronic acute chest syndrome complications. Acute complications include respiratory failure, altered mental status, seizures, stroke, intrapulmonary hemolysis, and multi-system organ failure. Chronic complications from recurring acute chest syndrome include cor pulmonale, pulmonary hypertension, chronic sickle lung disease, and restrictive pulmonary function.

== Prognosis ==
It may result in death, and it is one of the most common causes of death for people with sickle cell anemia.
