= IgA nephropathy =

Disease of the kidney

- Other names: IgA nephritis, Berger's disease
- Immunoglobulin A dimer
- Specialty: Nephrology; Rheumatology

IgA nephropathy (IgAN), also known as Berger's disease (/bɛərˈʒeɪ/) (and variations), or synpharyngitic glomerulonephritis, is a disease of the kidney (or nephropathy) and the immune system; specifically it is a form of glomerulonephritis or an inflammation of the glomeruli of the kidney. Aggressive Berger's disease (a rarer form of the disease) can attack other major organs, such as the liver, skin and heart.

IgA nephropathy is the most common glomerulonephritis worldwide; the global incidence is 2.5/100,000 per year amongst adults. Aggressive Berger's disease is on the NORD list of rare diseases. Primary IgA nephropathy is characterized by deposition of the IgA antibody in the glomerulus. There are other diseases associated with glomerular IgA deposits, the most common being IgA vasculitis (formerly known as Henoch–Schönlein purpura [HSP]), which is considered by many to be a systemic form of IgA nephropathy. IgA vasculitis presents with a characteristic purpuric skin rash, arthritis, and abdominal pain, and occurs more commonly in children. HSP is associated with a more benign prognosis than IgA nephropathy. In non-aggressive IgA nephropathy, there is traditionally a slow progression to chronic kidney failure in 25–30% of cases during 20 years.

== Signs and symptoms ==
The classic presentation for the non-aggressive form (in 40–50% of the cases) is episodic hematuria, which usually starts within a day or two of a non-specific upper respiratory tract infection (hence synpharyngitic), as opposed to post-streptococcal glomerulonephritis, which occurs some time (weeks) after initial infection. With both aggressive and non-aggressive Berger's disease, loin pain can also occur. The gross hematuria may resolve after a few days, though microscopic hematuria will persist; it is, however, more common with aggressive Berger's disease for gross hematuria to persist rather than microscopic hematuria. Renal function usually remains normal with non-aggressive Berger's disease, though rarely acute kidney failure may occur (see below). This presentation is more common in younger adults.

A smaller proportion (20–30%), usually the older population, has microscopic hematuria and proteinuria (less than 2 grams/day). These patients may be asymptomatic and only picked up due to urinalysis. Hence, the disease is more commonly diagnosed in situations where screening of urine is compulsory (e.g., schoolchildren in Japan).

Very rarely (5% each), the presenting history is:

- Nephritic syndrome
- Acute kidney failure (either as a complication of the frank hematuria, when it usually recovers, or due to rapidly progressive glomerulonephritis which often leads to chronic kidney failure)
- Chronic kidney failure (no previous symptoms, presents with anemia, hypertension, and other symptoms of kidney failure, in people who probably had longstanding undetected microscopic hematuria and/or proteinuria)

A variety of systemic diseases are associated with aggressive IgA nephropathy (Berger's disease) such as liver failure, cancer, celiac disease, systemic lupus erythematosus, rheumatoid arthritis, heart failure, reactive arthritis, ankylosing spondylitis and HIV. Diagnosis of Berger's disease and a search for any associated disease occasionally reveals an underlying serious systemic disease. Occasionally, there are simultaneous symptoms of Henoch–Schönlein purpura; see below for more details on the association. Some HLA alleles have been suspected, along with complement phenotypes, as being genetic factors. Non-aggressive Berger's disease may also be associated with any of the above systemic diseases; however, this is rare.

== Morphology ==
Histologically, IgA nephropathy may show mesangial widening and focal and segmental inflammation. Diffuse mesangial proliferation or crescentic glomerulonephritis may also be present. Immunofluorescence shows mesangial deposition of IgA often with C3 and properdin and smaller amounts of other immunoglobulins (IgG or IgM). Early components of the classical complement pathway (C1q or C4) are usually not seen. Electron microscopy confirms electron-dense deposits in the mesangium that may extend to the subendothelial area of adjacent capillary walls in a small subset of cases, usually those with focal proliferation.

== Pathophysiology ==
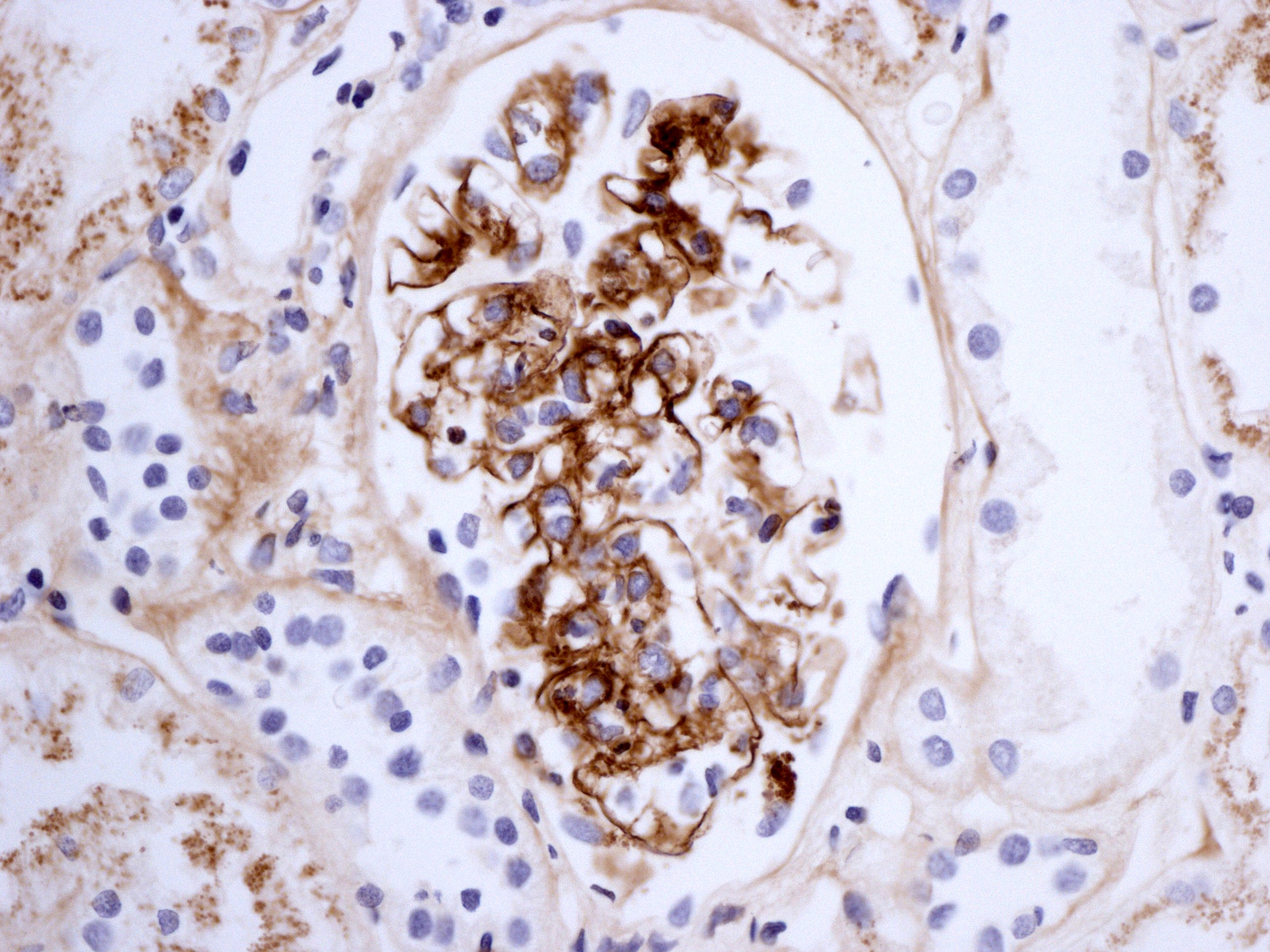
Immunostaining showing IgA in the glomerulus of a patient with Henoch-Schönlein nephritis.

The pathophysiology, signs and symptoms, and treatment of IgA nephropathy.

The disease derives its name from deposits of immunoglobulin A (IgA) in a granular pattern in the mesangium (by immunofluorescence), a region of the renal glomerulus. The mesangium by light microscopy may be hypercellular and show increased deposition of extracellular matrix proteins. In terms of the renal manifestation of Henoch–Schönlein purpura, it has been found that although it shares the same histological spectrum as IgA nephropathy, a greater frequency of severe lesions such as glomerular necrosis and crescents was observed. Correspondingly, HSP nephritis has a higher frequency of glomerular staining for fibrin compared with IgAN, but with an otherwise similar immunofluorescence profile.

There is no clear known explanation for the accumulation of IgA. Exogenous antigens for IgA have not been identified in the kidney, but this antigen may have been cleared before the disease manifests itself. It has also been proposed that IgA itself may be the antigen.

=== Gd-IgA1 ===
A recently advanced theory focuses on post-translational abnormalities of the IgA1 molecule of the Type III hypersensitivity type. IgA1 is one of the two immunoglobulin subclasses (the other is IgD) that is O-glycosylated on many serine and threonine residues in a special proline-rich hinge region.

Under-galactosylated IgA1 antibodies bind with IgG antibodies in the blood, and that such IgA1-IgG complexes get deposited in the kidneys, especially the glomerular mesangium, as happens in type III hypersensitivity disorders. This is followed by inflammation and hematuria.

A similar mechanism has been claimed to underlie Henoch–Schönlein purpura, a vasculitis that mainly affects children and can feature renal involvement that is almost indistinguishable from IgA nephritis. However, human studies have found that degalactosylation of IgA1 occurs in patients with IgA nephropathy in response only to gut antigen exposures (not systemic), and occurs in healthy people to a lesser extent. This strongly suggests degalactosylation of IgA1 is a result of an underlying phenomenon (abnormal mucosal antigen handling) and not the ultimate cause of IgA nephropathy. Prevailing evidence suggests that both galactose-deficient o-glycans in the hinge region of IgA1 and the synthesis and binding of antibodies against IgA1 are required for immunoglobulin complexes to form and accumulate in glomeruli.

From the fact that IgAN can recur after renal transplant, it can be postulated that the disease is caused by a problem in the immune system rather than the kidney itself. Remarkably, the IgA1 that accumulates in the kidney does not appear to originate from the mucosa-associated lymphoid tissue (MALT), which is the site of most upper respiratory tract infections, but from the bone marrow. This, too, suggests an immune pathology rather than direct interference by outside agents.

=== Prognosis ===
Since IgA nephropathy commonly presents without symptoms through abnormal findings on urinalysis, there is considerable possibility for variation in any population studied, depending upon the screening policy. Similarly, the local policy for performing kidney biopsy assumes a critical role; if it is a policy to simply observe patients with isolated bloody urine, a group with a generally favourable prognosis will be excluded. If, in contrast, all such patients are biopsied, then the group with isolated microscopic hematuria and isolated mesangial IgA will be included and improve the prognosis of that particular series.

Nevertheless, IgA nephropathy, which was initially thought to be a benign disease, is not a benign condition, particularly if the patient presents with an aggressive form. Though most reports describe Berger's disease as having an indolent evolution towards either healing or renal damage, a more aggressive course is occasionally seen associated with extensive crescents, and presenting as acute kidney failure. In general, the entry into chronic kidney failure is slow as compared to most other glomerulonephritides – occurring over a time scale of 30 years or more (in contrast to the 5 to 15 years in other glomerulonephritides), however, in aggressive Berger's disease the time scale is within 5–10 years and often sooner. This may reflect the earlier diagnosis made due to frank hematuria.

Complete remission of aggressive Berger's disease rarely occurs in adults. In about 5% of cases, however, there is a higher chance of remission with non-aggressive Berger's disease (this is estimated to be around 7.4% of cases). There is a high chance of relapse, particularly with aggressive Berger's disease. However, given the evolution of this disease, the longer-term (10–20 years) outcome of such patients is not yet established.

Overall, the current 10-year survival rate for aggressive Berger's disease is 25% and 73% for non-aggressive Berger's disease.

== Diagnosis ==
For an adult patient with isolated hematuria, tests such as ultrasound of the kidney and cystoscopy are usually done first to pinpoint the source of the bleeding. These tests would rule out kidney stones and bladder cancer, two other common urological causes of hematuria. In children and younger adults, the history and association with respiratory infection can raise the suspicion of IgA nephropathy. A kidney biopsy is necessary to confirm the diagnosis. The biopsy specimen shows proliferation of the mesangium, with IgA deposits on immunofluorescence and electron microscopy. However, patients with isolated microscopic hematuria (i.e., without associated proteinuria and with normal kidney function) are not usually biopsied since this is associated with an excellent prognosis. A urinalysis will show red blood cells, usually as red cell urinary casts. Proteinuria, usually less than 2 grams per day, also may be present. Other renal causes of isolated hematuria include thin basement membrane disease and Alport syndrome, the latter being a hereditary disease associated with hearing impairment and eye problems.

Other blood tests done to aid in the diagnosis include CRP or ESR, complement levels, ANA, and LDH. Protein electrophoresis and immunoglobulin levels can show increased IgA in 50% of all patients.

== Treatment ==
The ideal treatment for IgAN would remove IgA from the glomerulus and prevent further IgA deposition. This goal remains a remote prospect. There are a few additional caveats that have to be considered while treating IgA nephropathy. IgA nephropathy has a very variable course, ranging from a benign recurrent hematuria up to a rapid progression to chronic kidney failure and failure of other major organs. Hence, the decision on which patients to treat should be based on the prognostic factors and the risk of progression. Also, IgA nephropathy recurs in transplants despite the use of ciclosporin, azathioprine or mycophenolate mofetil, cyclophosphamide, Isotretinoin and steroids in these patients. There are persisting uncertainties due to the limited number of patients included in the few controlled, randomized studies performed to date. These studies hardly produce statistically significant evidence regarding the heterogeneity of IgA nephropathy patients, the diversity of study treatment protocols, and the length of follow-up.

=== Immunosuppression ===
==== Corticoteroids ====
A subset of IgA nephropathy patients, who have minimal change disease on light microscopy and clinically have nephrotic syndrome, show an exquisite response to corticosteroids, behaving more or less like minimal change disease. In other patients, the evidence for corticosteroids is not compelling. Short courses of high-dose corticosteroids have been proven to lack benefit. However, in patients with aggressive Berger's disease, a 6-month regimen of corticosteroids in addition to other medications may lessen proteinuria and preserve kidney function. The study had 10 years of patient follow-up data, and did show a benefit for steroid therapy; there was a lower chance of progression to kidney failure (kidney function so poor that dialysis was required) in the corticosteroid group. Importantly, angiotensin-converting enzyme inhibitors were used in both groups equally.

In December 2021, budesonide (Tarpeyo) was approved for medical use in the US to reduce proteinuria in adults with primary IgA nephropathy at risk of rapid disease progression.

==== Anti-APRIL/BAFF ====
Sibeprenlimab (Voyxact), a monoclonal antibody against APRIL, was approved for medical use in the United States in November 2025. Unlike other immunosuppressants, it does not appear to significantly increase the risk of infectious diseases.

Atacicept (Trutakna) was approved for medical use in the United States in July 2026. It targets both BAFF and APRIL.

==== Other immunosuppressants ====
Cyclophosphamide (traded as endoxan and cytoxan) and Isotretinoin have commonly been used, often with anti-platelet/anticoagulants in patients with Aggressive Berger's disease, however, the side effect profile of these drugs, including long term risk of malignancy and sterility, made them an unfavorable choice for use in young adults. However, one recent study, in a carefully selected high risk population of patients with declining GFR, showed that a combination of steroids and cyclophosphamide for the initial 3 months followed by azathioprine for a minimum of 2 years resulted in a significant preservation of renal function. Other agents such as mycophenolate mofetil, ciclosporin and mizoribine have also been tried with varying results.

==== Other immuno-modulation methods ====
In cases where tonsillitis is the precipitating factor for episodic hematuria, a tonsillectomy has been claimed to reduce the frequency of those episodes. Although there is not strong evidence that this approach reduces the incidence of progressive kidney failure, it remains common practice in certain East Asian countries. Dietary gluten restriction, used to reduce mucosal antigen challenge, also has not been shown to preserve kidney function. Phenytoin has also been tried without any benefit.

=== Antihypertensives ===
The events that tend to lead to progressive kidney failure are not unique to IgA nephropathy, and non-specific measures to reduce the same would be equally useful. These include a low-protein diet and optimal control of blood pressure. The choice of antihypertensive agent is open as long as the blood pressure is controlled to the desired level. However, angiotensin converting enzyme inhibitors and angiotensin II receptor antagonists are favoured due to their anti-proteinuric effect.

Sparsentan is a therapy recently approved in the USA for treating primary IgA nephropathy. It is a dual endothelin angiotensin receptor antagonist that uniquely combines angiotensin and endothelin inhibition without immunosuppression. In clinical trials, sparsentan demonstrated significant reductions in proteinuria and better preservation of kidney function than irbesartan, a standard treatment. These results were evident in the 36-week interim analysis of the phase 3 PROTECT trial and sustained through 110 weeks in the final analysis. This approval marks a significant milestone in managing IgA nephropathy, offering new option for affected patients.

=== Diet ===
As with other progressive kidney diseases, a low-protein diet is recommended.

A 1994 study by Mayo Clinic found that long-term treatment with omega−3 fatty acid-rich fish oil, which does not have the drawbacks of immunosuppressive therapy, was associated with slight reduction of progression to kidney failure, without, however, reducing proteinuria in a subset of patients with high risk of worsening kidney function. However, these results were not reproduced by other study groups and in two subsequent meta-analyses.

== Prognosis ==
Male sex, proteinuria (especially > 2 g/day), hypertension, smoking, hyperlipidemia, older age, familial disease and elevated creatinine concentrations are markers of a poor outcome. Frank hematuria has shown discordant results with most studies showing a better prognosis, perhaps related to the early diagnosis, except for one group which reported a poorer prognosis. Proteinuria and hypertension are the most powerful prognostic factors in this group.

Certain other features found by kidney biopsy, such as interstitial scarring, are associated with a poor prognosis. ACE gene polymorphism has recently been shown to have an impact, with the DD genotype associated more commonly with progression to kidney failure.

Disease progression in IgAN can be predicted at the time of kidney biopsy by a risk-prediction tool.

== Epidemiology ==
Men are affected three times as often as women. There is also marked geographic variation in the prevalence of IgA nephropathy throughout the world. It is the most common glomerular disease in the Far East and Southeast Asia, accounting for almost half of all patients with glomerular disease; however, it accounts for only about 25% of the proportion in Europeans and about 10% among North Americans, with African–Americans having a very low prevalence of about 2%. A confounding factor in this analysis is the existing policy of screening and use of kidney biopsy as an investigative tool. School children in Japan and army recruits in Singapore undergo routine urinalysis, and any suspicious abnormality is pursued with a kidney biopsy, which might partly explain the high observed incidence of IgA nephropathy in those countries.

=== Genetics ===
Though various associations have been described, no consistent pattern pointing to a single susceptible gene has been identified to date. Associations described include those with C4 null allele, factor B Bf alleles, MHC antigens, and IgA isotypes. ACE gene polymorphism (D allele) is associated with progression of kidney failure, similar to its association with other causes of chronic kidney failure. However, more than 90% of cases of IgA nephropathy are sporadic, with a few large pedigrees described from Kentucky and Italy (Online Mendelian Inheritance in Man (OMIM): 161950).

== History ==
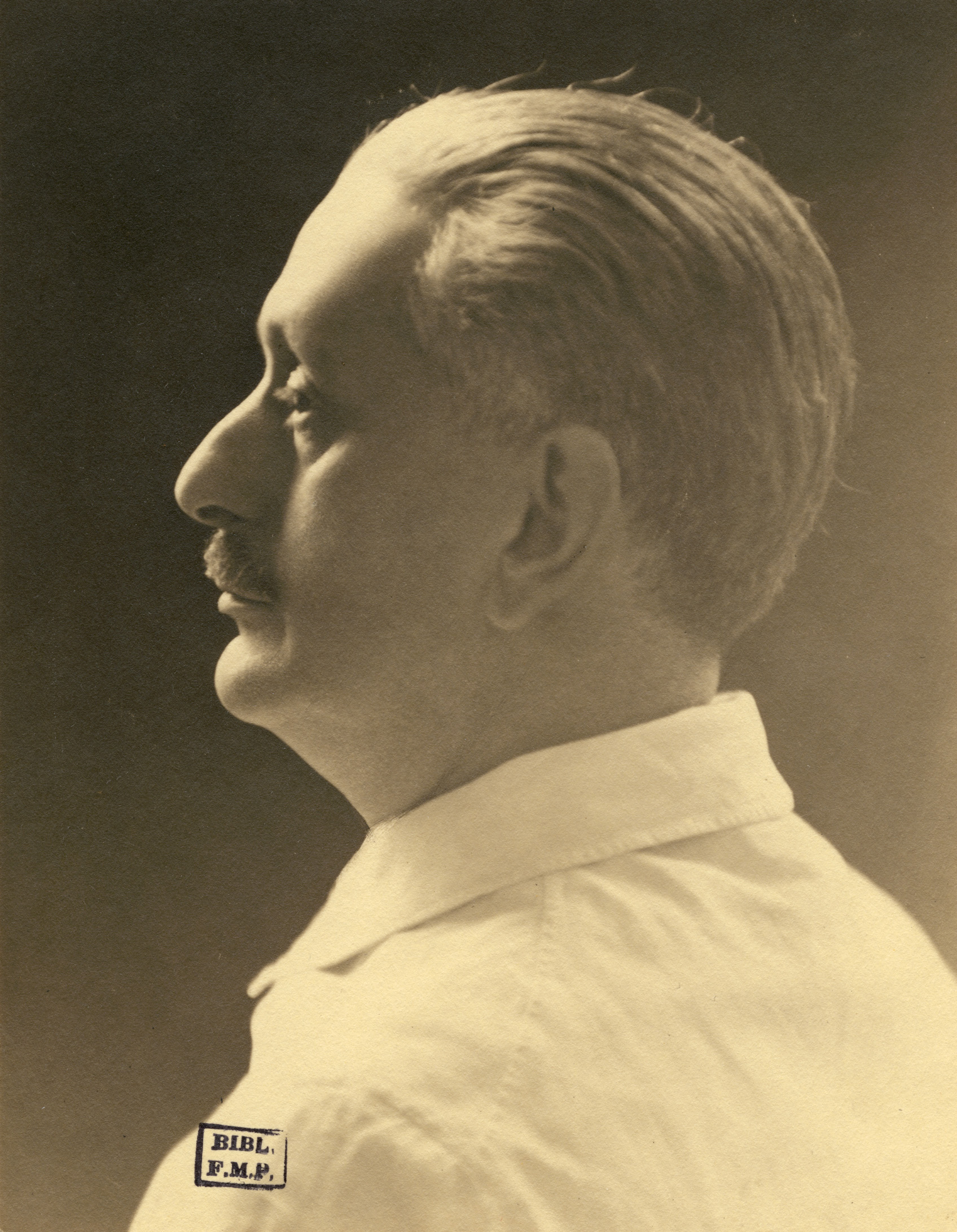
Dr Jean Berger

William Heberden the elder first described the disease in 1801 in a 5-year-old child with abdominal pain, hematuria, hematochezia, and purpura of the legs. In 1837, Johann Lukas Schönlein described a syndrome of purpura associated with joint pain and urinary precipitates in children. Eduard Heinrich Henoch, a student of Schönlein's, further associated abdominal pain and renal involvement with the syndrome.

In 1968, Jean Berger (1930–2011), a pioneering French nephrologist, with co-author electron microscopist Nicole Hinglais, was the first to describe IgA deposition in this form of glomerulonephritis and it is consequently sometimes called Berger's disease.
