= B-cell activating factor =

Mammalian protein found in Homo sapiens

TNFSF13B
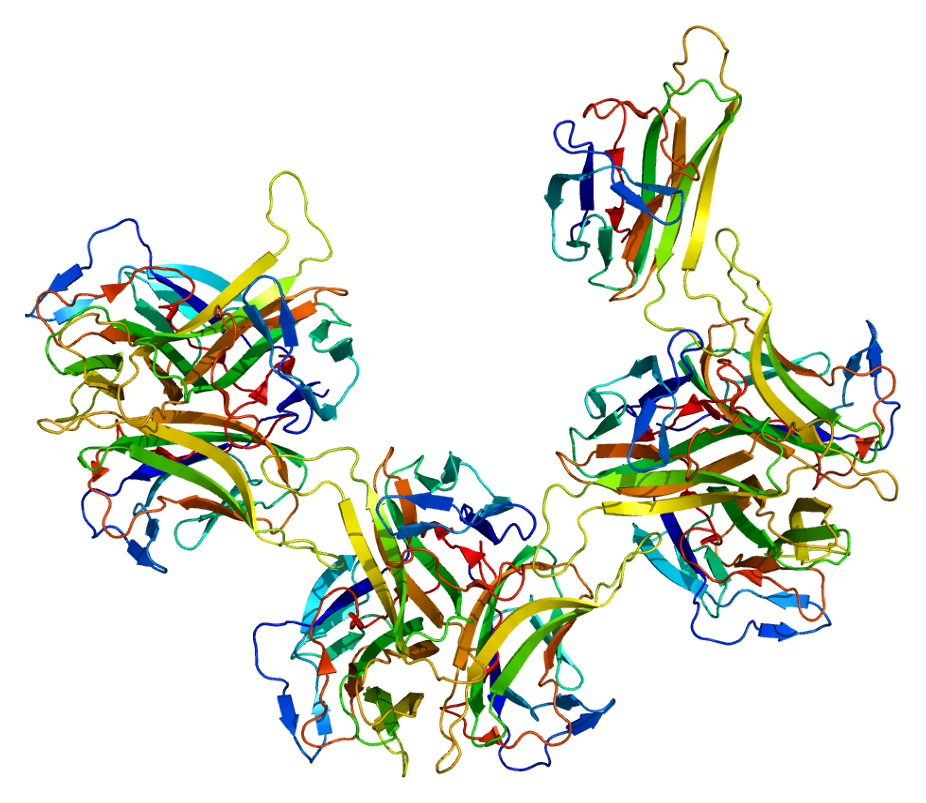

Identifiers
- Aliases: TNFSF13B, BAFF, BLYS, CD257, DTL, TALL-1, TALL1, THANK, TNFSF20, ZTNF4, TNLG7A, tumor necrosis factor superfamily member 13b, TNF superfamily member 13b
- External IDs: OMIM: 603969; MGI: 1344376; GeneCards: TNFSF13B
Available structures
| PDB | Ortholog search: PDBe RCSB |
| PDB | List of PDB id codes 1JH5, 1KD7, 1KXG, 1OQD, 1OQE, 1OSG, 3V56, 4V46, 4ZCH |

Gene location (Human)
| Chr. | Chromosome 13 (human) |
| Band | 13q33.3 | Start | 108,251,240 bp |
| Band | 13q33.3 | End | 108,308,484 bp |

Gene location (Mouse)
| Chr. | Chromosome 8 (mouse) |
| Band | 8 A1.1|8 4.55 cM | Start | 10,056,467 bp |
| Band | 8 A1.1|8 4.55 cM | End | 10,089,072 bp |
RNA expression pattern
| Bgee | Human / Mouse (ortholog); Top expressed in: monocyte; blood; trabecular bone; buccal mucosa cell; bone marrow; appendix; germinal epithelium; pancreatic epithelial cell; granulocyte; decidua / Top expressed in: granulocyte; morula; zygote; vas deferens; secondary oocyte; right lung lobe; intestinal villus; primary oocyte; lumbar subsegment of spinal cord; urethra; More reference expression data |
| BioGPS | n/a |
Gene ontology
| Molecular function | tumor necrosis factor receptor binding; cytokine activity; signaling receptor binding; protein binding |
| Cellular component | cytoplasm; integral component of membrane; perinuclear region of cytoplasm; extracellular region; plasma membrane; membrane; extracellular space |
| Biological process | cell population proliferation; tumor necrosis factor-mediated signaling pathway; immune response; signal transduction; positive regulation of cell population proliferation; immune system process; regulation of immune response; T cell costimulation; B cell homeostasis; B cell costimulation; positive regulation of T cell proliferation; positive regulation of B cell proliferation; positive regulation of germinal center formation; regulation of signaling receptor activity |
Sources:Amigo / QuickGO
Orthologs
| Databases | NCBI: entry; OMA: entry |
| Species | Human | Mouse |
| Entrez | 10673 | 24099 |
| Ensembl | ENSG00000102524 | ENSMUSG00000031497 |
| UniProt | Q9Y275 | Q9WU72 |
| RefSeq (mRNA) | NM_001145645; NM_006573 | NM_033622; NM_001347309 |
| RefSeq (protein) | NP_001139117; NP_006564 | NP_001334238; NP_296371 |
| Location (UCSC) | Chr 13: 108.25 – 108.31 Mb | Chr 8: 10.06 – 10.09 Mb |
| PubMed search |
- Wikidata
| View/Edit Human | View/Edit Mouse |

B-cell activating factor (BAFF) also known as tumor necrosis factor ligand superfamily member 13B and CD257 among other names, is a protein that in humans is encoded by the TNFSF13B gene. BAFF is also known as B Lymphocyte Stimulator (BLyS) and TNF- and APOL-related leukocyte expressed ligand (TALL-1) and the Dendritic cell-derived TNF-like molecule (CD257 antigen; cluster of differentiation 257).

== Structure and function ==
BAFF is a cytokine that belongs to the tumor necrosis factor (TNF) ligand family. This cytokine is a ligand for receptors TNFRSF13B/TACI, TNFRSF17/BCMA, and TNFRSF13C/BAFF-R. This cytokine is mainly expressed by myeloid cells, dendritic cells, and stromal cells, and acts as a potent B cell activator. It has been also shown to play an important role in the proliferation and differentiation of B cells.

BAFF is a 285-amino acid long peptide glycoprotein which undergoes glycosylation at residue 124. It is expressed as a membrane-bound type II transmembrane protein on various cell types including monocytes, dendritic cells and bone marrow stromal cells. The transmembrane form can be cleaved from the membrane, generating a soluble protein fragment. BAFF steady-state concentrations depend on B cells and also on the expression of BAFF-binding receptors. BAFF is the natural ligand of three nonconventional tumor necrosis factor receptors named BAFF-R (BR3), TACI (transmembrane activator and calcium modulator and cyclophilin ligand interactor), and BCMA (B-cell maturation antigen), all of which have differing binding affinities for it. These receptors are expressed mainly on mature B lymphocytes and their expression varies in dependence of B cell maturation (TACI is also found on a subset of T-cells and BCMA on plasma cells). BAFF-R is involved in the positive regulation during B cell development. TACI binds worst since its affinity is higher for a protein similar to BAFF, called a proliferation-inducing ligand (APRIL). BCMA displays an intermediate binding phenotype and will work with either BAFF or APRIL to varying degrees. Signaling through BAFF-R and BCMA stimulates B lymphocytes to undergo proliferation and to counter apoptosis. All these ligands act as homotrimers (i.e. three of the same molecule) interacting with homotrimeric receptors, although BAFF has been known to be active as either a hetero- or homotrimer (can aggregate into 60-mer depending on the primary structure of the protein).

== Interactions ==
B-cell activating factor has been shown to interact with TNFRSF13B, TNFSF13, TNFRSF13C, and TNFRSF17.

Interaction between BAFF and BAFF-R activates classical and noncanonical NF-κB signaling pathways. This interaction triggers signals essential for the formation and maintenance of B cell, thus it is important for a B-cell survival.

== Recombinant production ==
Human BLyS has been expressed and purified in E. Coli. The BLyS protein in the engineered bacteria can be as much as 50% to the bacteria's total protein content and still retains activity after a purification procedure.

== Clinical significance ==
As an immunostimulant, BAFF (BLyS, TALL-1) is necessary for maintaining normal immunity. Inadequate level of BAFF will fail to activate B cells to produce enough immunoglobulin and will lead to immunodeficiency.

Excessive level of BAFF causes abnormally high antibody production, results in systemic lupus erythematosus, rheumatoid arthritis, and many other autoimmune diseases. Overexpression of BAFF also correlates with enhanced humoral immunity against malaria infection.

Belimumab (Benlysta) is a monoclonal antibody developed by Human Genome Sciences and GlaxoSmithKline, with significant discovery input by Cambridge Antibody Technology, which specifically recognizes and inhibits the biological activity of B-Lymphocyte stimulator (BLyS) and is in clinical trials for treatment of Systemic lupus erythematosus and other autoimmune diseases.

BAFF has been found in renal transplant biopsies with acute rejection and correlate with appearance C4d. Increased levels of BAFF may initiate alloreactive B cell and T cell immunity, therefore may promote allograft rejection. Lower level of BAFF transcripts (or a higher level of soluble BAFF) show a higher risk of producing donor-specific antibodies in the investigated patients. Donor-specific antibodies bind with high affinity to the vascular endothelium of graft and activate complement. This process result in neutrophils infiltration, hemorrhage, fibrin deposition and platelet aggregation. Targeting BAFF-R interactions may provide new therapeutic possibilities in transplantation.

Blisibimod, a fusion protein inhibitor of BAFF, is in development by Anthera Pharmaceuticals, also primarily for the treatment of systemic lupus erythematosus.

BAFF may also be a new mediator of food-related inflammation. Higher levels of BAFF are present in non-atopic compared with atopic patients, and there is not any correlation between BAFF and IgE, suggesting that BAFF might be particularly involved in non-IgE-mediated reactions. In patients with celiac disease, serum BAFF levels are reduced after a gluten-free diet. The same reduction could be present in the recently defined "Non Celiac Gluten sensitivity" (a reaction to gluten which provokes almost the same symptoms of celiac disease and could involve up to 20% of apparently healthy individuals.) BAFF is also a specific inducer of insulin resistance and can be a strong link between inflammation and diabetes or obesity. BAFF gives the organism a sort of danger signal and usually, according to the evolutionary theories, every human being responds to danger activating thrifty genes in order to store fat and to avoid starvation. BAFF shares many activities with PAF (Platelet Activating Factor) and they are both markers of non-IgE-mediated reactions in food-reactivity.
