= APRIL (protein) =

Protein-coding gene in the species Homo sapiens

TNFSF13

Identifiers
- Aliases: TNFSF13, APRIL, CD256, TALL-2, TALL2, TRDL-1, ZTNF2, UNQ383/PRO715, TNLG7B, tumor necrosis factor superfamily member 13, TNF superfamily member 13
- External IDs: OMIM: 604472; MGI: 1916833; GeneCards: TNFSF13
Available structures
PDB	Ortholog search: PDBe RCSB
PDB	List of PDB id codes 4ZCH

Gene location (Human)
Chr.	Chromosome 17 (human)
Band	17p13.1	Start	7,558,292 bp
Band	17p13.1	End	7,561,608 bp

Gene location (Mouse)
Chr.	Chromosome 11 (mouse)
Band	11|11 B3	Start	69,573,672 bp
Band	11|11 B3	End	69,576,610 bp
RNA expression pattern
Bgee	Human / Mouse (ortholog); Top expressed in: monocyte; granulocyte; duodenum; mucosa of transverse colon; gallbladder; blood; right lung; upper lobe of left lung; human kidney; rectum / Top expressed in: layer of retina; neural layer of retina; colon; ileum; jejunum; duodenum; granulocyte; lung; esophagus; bone marrow; More reference expression data
BioGPS	n/a
Gene ontology
Molecular function	signaling receptor binding; tumor necrosis factor receptor binding; cytokine activity
Cellular component	cytosol; membrane; nucleoplasm; cytoplasm; extracellular exosome; extracellular region; extracellular space
Biological process	tumor necrosis factor-mediated signaling pathway; regulation of mRNA stability; positive regulation of cell population proliferation; immune system process; signal transduction; positive regulation of isotype switching to IgA isotypes; immune response; regulation of signaling receptor activity
Sources:Amigo / QuickGO
Orthologs
Databases	NCBI: entry; OMA: entry
Species	Human	Mouse
Entrez	8741	69583
Ensembl	ENSG00000161955	ENSMUSG00000089669
UniProt	O75888	Q9D777
RefSeq (mRNA)	NM_001198622; NM_001198623; NM_001198624; NM_003808; NM_172087 NM_172088	NM_001159505; NM_023517
RefSeq (protein)	NP_001185551; NP_001185552; NP_001185553; NP_003799; NP_742084 NP_742085	NP_001152977; NP_076006
Location (UCSC)	Chr 17: 7.56 – 7.56 Mb	Chr 11: 69.57 – 69.58 Mb
PubMed search
- Wikidata
View/Edit Human	View/Edit Mouse

A proliferation-inducing ligand (APRIL), also known as tumor necrosis factor ligand superfamily member 13 (TNFSF13), is a protein of the TNF superfamily recognized by the cell surface receptor TACI. It is encoded by the TNFSF13 gene.

== Nomenclature ==
In the cluster of differentiation terminology, APRIL is designated CD256. TNFSF13 is the HUGO standard gene name, but APRIL is more commonly used in medical literature.

== Function ==
The protein encoded by this gene is a member of the tumor necrosis factor ligand (TNF) ligand family. This protein is a ligand for TNFRSF17/BCMA, a member of the TNF receptor family. This protein and its receptor are both found to be important for B cell development. In vivo experiments suggest an important role for APRIL in the long-term survival of plasma cells in the bone marrow. Mice deficient in APRIL have normal immune system development. However, APRIL-deficient mice have also been reported to possess a reduced ability to support plasma cell survival. In vitro experiments suggested that this protein may be able to induce apoptosis through its interaction with other TNF receptor family proteins such as TNFRSF6/FAS and TNFRSF14/HVEM. Three alternatively spliced transcript variants of this gene encoding distinct isoforms have been reported.

== Interactions ==
TNFSF13 has been shown to interact with TNFRSF13B and B-cell activating factor.

== Clinical significance ==
APRIL is being explored as a target for autoimmune diseases and B cell malignancies. At least one anti-APRIL monoclonal antibody (mAb) has been announced to enter phase I clinical trials for multiple myeloma.

APRIL is also a target for IgA nephropathy. At least one anti-APRIL mAb has finished phase 3 trials for this indication. APRIL is believed to contribute to the disease process by causing B cells to produce excessive galactose-deficient IgA1.
