= B-cell maturation antigen =

Protein-coding gene in the species Homo sapiens

TNFRSF17
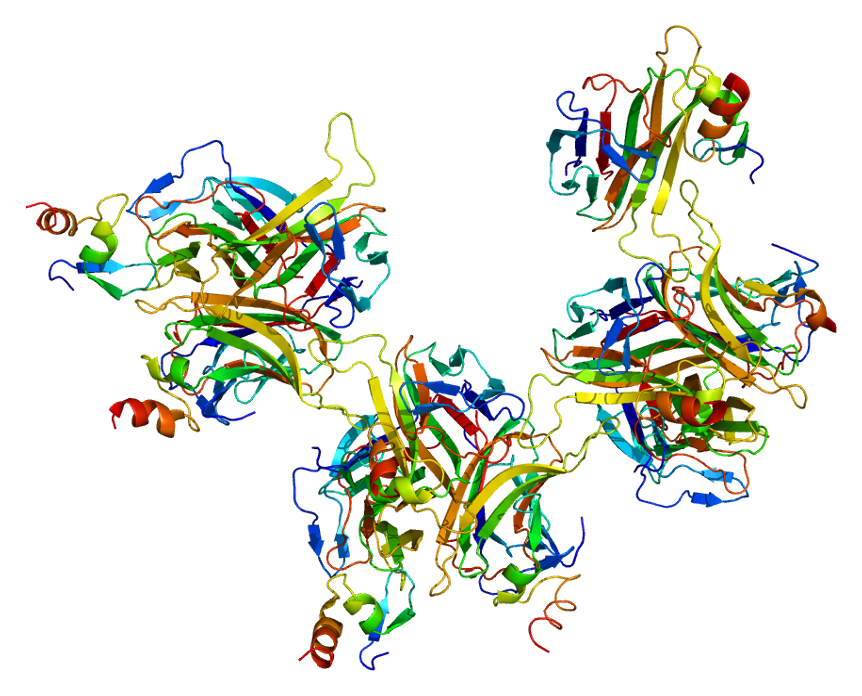

Identifiers
- Aliases: TNFRSF17, BCM, BCMA, CD269, TNFRSF13A, tumor necrosis factor receptor superfamily member 17, TNF receptor superfamily member 17
- External IDs: OMIM: 109545; MGI: 1343050; GeneCards: TNFRSF17
Available structures
PDB	Ortholog search: PDBe RCSB
PDB	List of PDB id codes 1OQD, 1XU2, 2KN1, 4ZFO

Gene location (Human)
Chr.	Chromosome 16 (human)
Band	16p13.13	Start	11,965,210 bp
Band	16p13.13	End	11,968,068 bp

Gene location (Mouse)
Chr.	Chromosome 16 (mouse)
Band	16|16 A1	Start	11,131,676 bp
Band	16|16 A1	End	11,137,938 bp
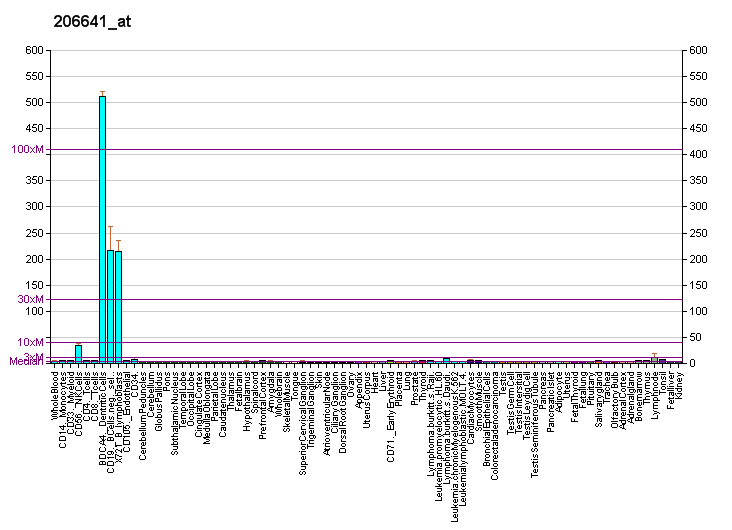
RNA expression pattern
Bgee	Human / Mouse (ortholog); Top expressed in: rectum; mucosa of transverse colon; jejunal mucosa; mucosa of sigmoid colon; testicle; lymph node; epithelium of nasopharynx; appendix; spleen; duodenum / Top expressed in: blastocyst; morula; duodenum; jejunum; spleen; lip; thymus; secondary oocyte; colon; ileum; More reference expression data
BioGPS	More reference expression data
Gene ontology
Molecular function	signaling receptor activity
Cellular component	endomembrane system; plasma membrane; membrane; integral component of membrane
Biological process	multicellular organism development; tumor necrosis factor-mediated signaling pathway; lymphocyte homeostasis; cell population proliferation; immune system process; adaptive immune response; signal transduction
Sources:Amigo / QuickGO
Orthologs
Databases	NCBI: entry; OMA: entry
Species	Human	Mouse
Entrez	608	21935
Ensembl	ENSG00000048462	ENSMUSG00000022496
UniProt	Q02223	O88472
RefSeq (mRNA)	NM_001192	NM_011608
RefSeq (protein)	NP_001183	NP_035738
Location (UCSC)	Chr 16: 11.97 – 11.97 Mb	Chr 16: 11.13 – 11.14 Mb
PubMed search
- Wikidata
View/Edit Human	View/Edit Mouse

BCMA TALL-1 binding domain
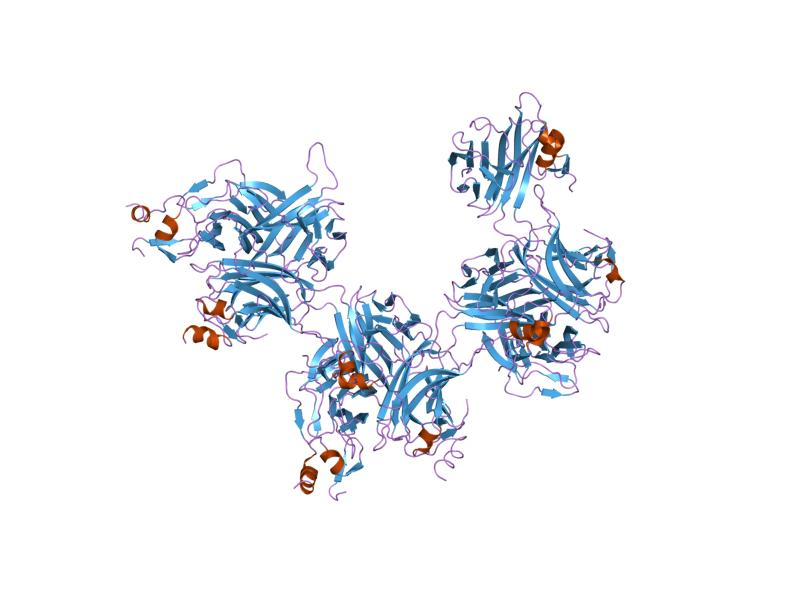
- crystal structure of stall-1 and bcma

Identifiers
- Symbol: BCMA-Tall_bind
- Pfam: PF09257
- InterPro: IPR015337
- SCOP2: 1oqd / SCOPe / SUPFAM
Available protein structures:
- PDB: IPR015337 PF09257 (ECOD; PDBsum)
- AlphaFold: IPR015337; PF09257

B-cell maturation antigen (BCMA or BCM), also known as tumor necrosis factor receptor superfamily member 17 (TNFRSF17), is a protein that in humans is encoded by the TNFRSF17 gene.

TNFRSF17 is a cell surface receptor of the TNF receptor superfamily which recognizes B-cell activating factor (BAFF).

Serum B-cell maturation antigen (sBCMA) is the cleaved form of BCMA, found at low levels in the serum of normal patients and generally elevated in patients with multiple myeloma (MM).

== Function ==
The protein encoded by this gene is a member of the TNF-receptor superfamily. This receptor is preferentially expressed in mature B lymphocytes, and may be important for B cell development and autoimmune response. This receptor has been shown to specifically bind to the tumor necrosis factor (ligand) superfamily, member 13b (TNFSF13B/TALL-1/BAFF), and to lead to NF-kappaB and MAPK8/JNK activation. This receptor also binds to various TRAF family members, and thus may transduce signals for cell survival and proliferation.

== Interactions ==
TNFRSF17 has been shown to interact with the B-cell activating factor TNFSF13B. A conserved domain at the N-terminus, BCMA TALL-1 binding domain, is required for binding to the TNFSF13B.

== Clinical significance ==
TNFRSF17 is implicated in leukemia, lymphomas, and multiple myeloma (see the "Mitelman Database" and the Atlas of Genetics and Cytogenetics in Oncology and Haematology,).

== As a drug target ==
An antibody-drug conjugate Belantamab mafodotin (GSK2857916) has been evaluated in patients with relapsed/refractory multiple myeloma. Belantamab mafodotin was approved in the United States in August 2020 for the treatment of patients with relapsed or refractory multiple myeloma who have received at least four prior therapies.

Chimeric antigen receptor (CAR) T cells have emerged as an important therapy for multiple myeloma after first reports in preclinical and phase I clinical studies. A Phase 1b/2 study of JNJ-4528, a CAR-T cell therapy directed against BCMA in myeloma patients refractory to a proteasome inhibitor or immunomodulatory drug, and who had received an anti-CD38 antibody has been completed.

ALLO-715 is a CAR-T therapy by Allogene Therapeutics that targets B-cell maturation antigen (BCMA). As of June 2021, it is undergoing clinical trials for the treatment of multiple myeloma. On 21 April 2021, the FDA granted Regenerative Medicine Advanced Therapy status to ALLO-715. ALLO-715 is being investigated at Memorial Sloan Kettering Cancer Center and the Mayo Clinic as part of the UNIVERSAL trial for multiple myeloma, on its own and in conjunction with the selective gamma secretase inhibitor nirogacestat.
