= Signaling lymphocytic activation molecule =

Identifiers
- Symbol: SLAM
- Pfam: PF06214
- InterPro: IPR010407
- Membranome: 164
Available protein structures:
- PDB: IPR010407 PF06214 (ECOD; PDBsum)
- AlphaFold: IPR010407; PF06214

Signaling lymphocytic activation molecule (SLAM) is a family of genes. Homophilic binding between SLAMs is involved in cell-to-cell adhesion during antigen presentation.

Signaling lymphocytic activation molecules are a CD2-related surface receptor expressed by activated phagocytes, T helper cells, and platelets. SLAMs have a variety of functions, including enhancing T cellular proliferation by stimulating IL-4 and IFN-gamma production. SLAM family (SLAMF) receptors can interact directly with microbes, which can cause phagocytic cells to migrate to the area. SLAMF activation can trigger SLAM-associated protein (SAP) activation and a defective SAP can cause X-linked lymphoproliferative syndrome (XLP).

== Family members ==
Members of the family include:

- SLAMF1 (CD150)
- SLAMF2 (CD48, FimH)
- SLAMF3 (CD229, LY9)
- SLAMF4 (CD244, 2B4)
- SLAMF5 (CD84)
- SLAMF6 (CD352)
- SLAMF7 (CD319, CRACC)
- SLAMF8 (CD353)
- SLAMF9

== Location and function ==
SLAMFs are CD2-related surface receptors expressed by activated B and T cells, natural killer (NK) cells, dendritic cells, macrophages, eosinophils, neutrophils, and platelets, although different SLAMF receptors have varying expression patterns. SLAMF receptors are cell surface transmembrane molecules that can interact directly with microbes, which can cause phagocytic cells to migrate to the area. SLAMF1 and SLAMF6 are known to directly interact with outer membrane porins on gram negative bacteria. SLAMF1 is a known receptor for the measles virus and also serves as an opsonin for phagocytic cells, enhancing phagocytosis by localizing to phagosomes and inducing a signaling cascade resulting in enhanced fusion of phagosomes and lysosomes. SLAMF2 is known to bind gram negative bacteria and is internalized after binding, promoting phagocytosis. SLAMFs are also involved in immune cell communication; SLAMFs are co-stimulatory molecules for both T-cells and NK cells. SLAMs enhance T helper cell proliferation by increasing IFN-gamma and IL-4 production.

== Structure ==
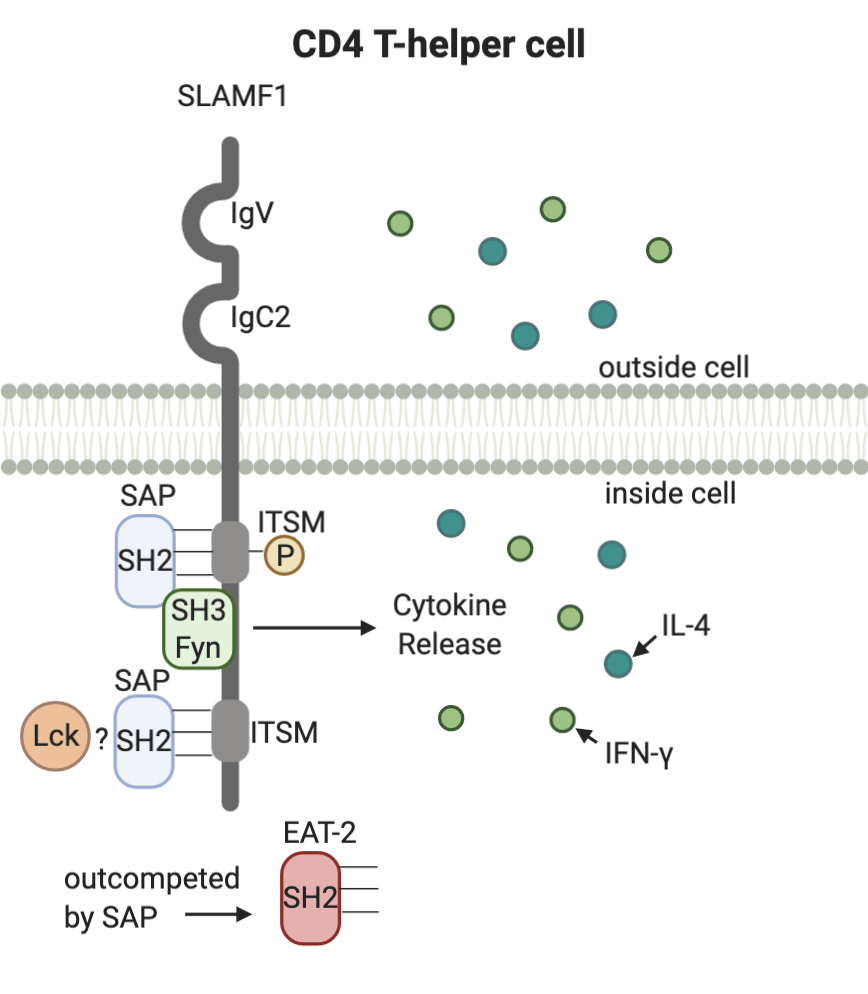
This diagram shows the signaling pathway for a SLAMF1 receptor in a CD4 T-helper cell. It depicts SAP (Slam-Associated Protein) outcompeting EAT-2 (Ewing's sarcoma-associated transcript 2) using a 3-pronged binding pattern to ITSMs on the SLAMF. The ITSMs do not necessarily need to be phosphorylated for SAP to bind, but they do need to be phosphorylated for EAT-2 to bind. SAP binding leads to Fyn recruitment and eventually IL-4 and IFN-gamma release.

All members of the SLAMF family are classified as type I glycoproteins and share an amino-terminal IgV variable domain and a membrane-adjacent IgC2 constant domain, along with immunoreceptor tyrosine-based switch motifs (ITSMs). The IgV and IgC2 domains are located on the extracellular portion of the receptor, while the ITSMs are used for signaling within the cell. SLAMFs can undergo alternative splicing, which can generate different isoforms of the SLAMF molecules that have different numbers of ITSMs and tyrosines, potentially with different functions. Proteins with SH2 domains are able to bind these ITSMs to initiate signaling cascades within the cell. SLAMF2 and SLAMF4 interact with one another, but all other SLAMF receptors are self-ligands, meaning that they interact with the corresponding receptor on other cells in a homophilic way.

== Uses in immunotherapy ==
SLAMFs are potential targets for immunotherapy. For example, elotuzumab is an anti-SLAMF7 humanized monoclonal antibody used to treat multiple myeloma. SLAMF7 is a self-ligand over-expressed in plasma cells of multiple myeloma patients. Elotuzumab stimulates NK cells to release granzyme through blocking SLAMF7, through triggering antibody-dependent cellular cytotoxicity (ADCC), and through NK cell activation via Ewing's sarcoma-associated transcript 2 (EAT-2). EAT-2 is known to bind to phosphorylated tyrosines on ITSMs and alter cytokine production. Elotuzumab also blocks multiple myeloma cells from interacting with one another via the SLAMF7 ligand.

== SLAM-associated protein (SAP) ==
The X-linked SLAM-associated protein (SAP), encoded by the SH2D1A gene, consists primarily of an SH2 domain which can interact with ITSMs present on most SLAMF receptors. Unlike most SH2 binding proteins, SAP does not require tyrosines on the ITSMs to be phosphorylated prior to binding. SAP is expressed in lymphocytes (specifically NK cells and T cells, but not usually B cells), eosinophils, and platelets. A defective SLAM associated protein (SAP) causes X-linked lymphoproliferative syndrome (XLP), a frequently lethal mononucleosis characterized by inability to respond to infection with Epstein-Barr virus (EBV), leading to a failure to clear B-cells infected with the virus, which can be fatal.
