= CD48 =

Protein-coding gene in humans

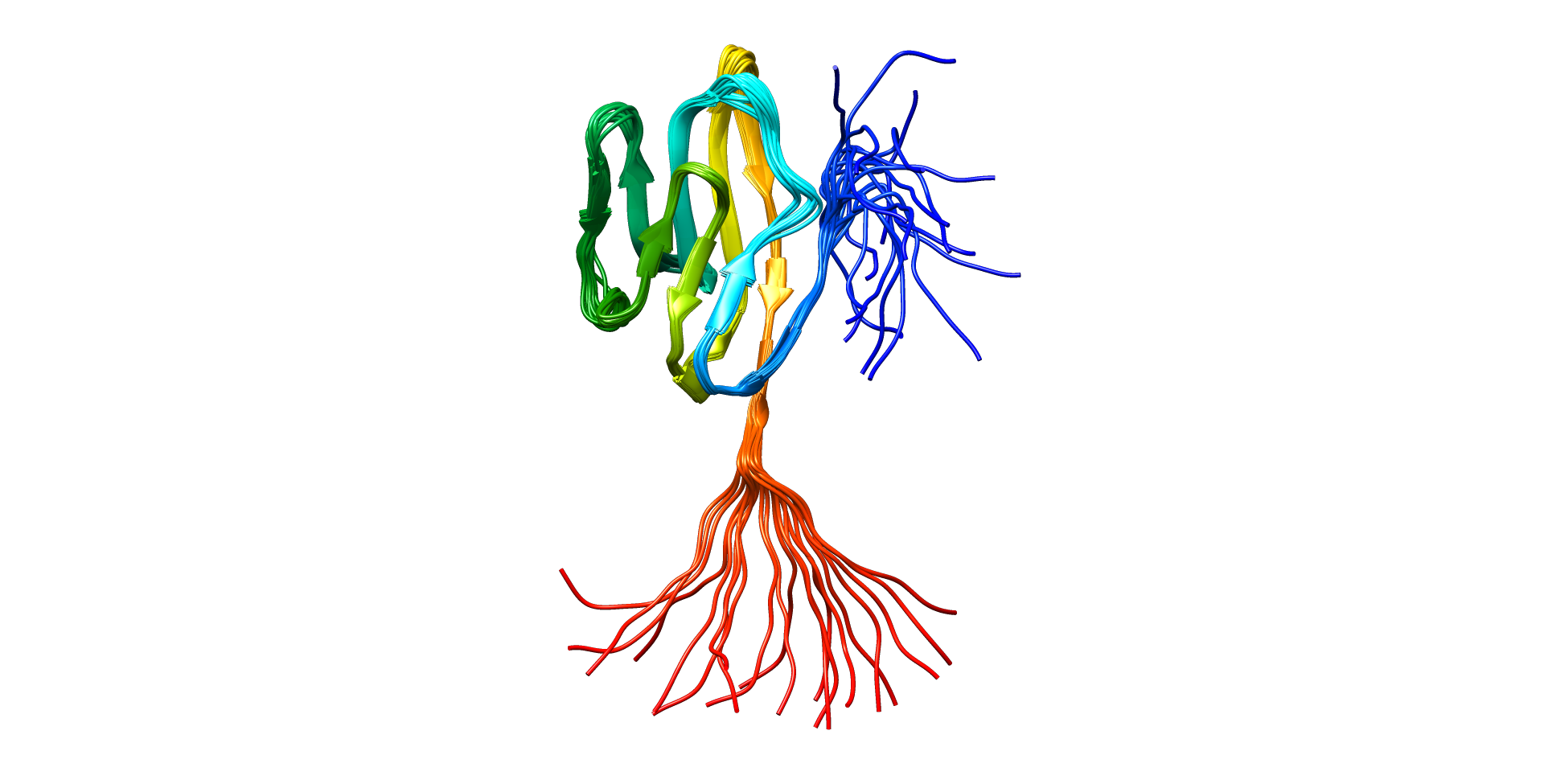

Identifiers
- Aliases: CD48, BCM1, BLAST, BLAST1, MEM-102, SLAMF2, hmCD48 molecule
- External IDs: OMIM: 109530; MGI: 88339; GeneCards: CD48
Available structures
| PDB | Ortholog search: PDBe RCSB |
| PDB | List of PDB id codes 2EDO |

Gene location (Human)
| Chr. | Chromosome 1 (human) |
| Band | 1q23.3 | Start | 160,678,746 bp |
| Band | 1q23.3 | End | 160,711,831 bp |

Gene location (Mouse)
| Chr. | Chromosome 1 (mouse) |
| Band | 1 H3|1 79.54 cM | Start | 171,509,577 bp |
| Band | 1 H3|1 79.54 cM | End | 171,532,826 bp |
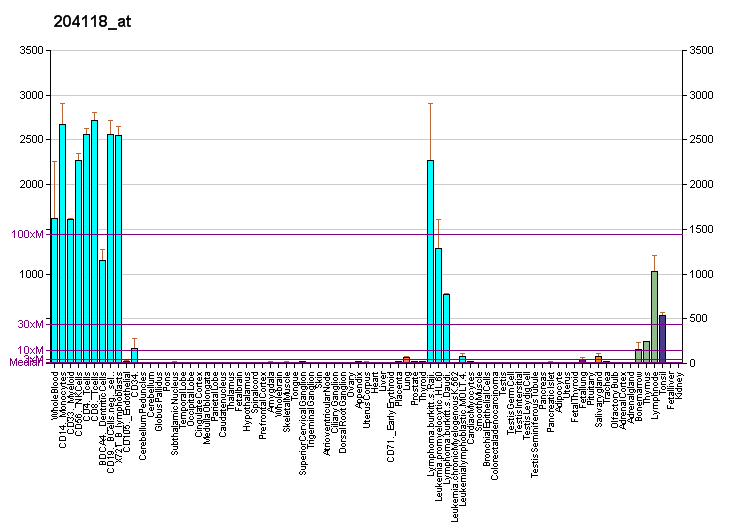
RNA expression pattern
| Bgee | Human / Mouse (ortholog); Top expressed in: white blood cell; mononuclear cell; monocyte; granulocyte; blood; bone marrow cell; appendix; spleen; lymph node; epithelium of colon / Top expressed in: mesenteric lymph nodes; spleen; stroma of bone marrow; blood; thymus; calvaria; granulocyte; subcutaneous adipose tissue; white adipose tissue; pharynx; More reference expression data |
| BioGPS | More reference expression data |
Gene ontology
| Molecular function | protein binding; antigen binding; signaling receptor activity |
| Cellular component | membrane raft; anchored component of membrane; plasma membrane; integral component of plasma membrane; extracellular exosome; membrane; intrinsic component of plasma membrane |
| Biological process | defense response; leukocyte migration; regulation of adaptive immune response |
Sources:Amigo / QuickGO
Orthologs
| Databases | NCBI: entry; OMA: entry |
| Species | Human | Mouse |
| Entrez | 962 | 12506 |
| Ensembl | ENSG00000117091 | ENSMUSG00000015355 |
| UniProt | P09326 | P18181 |
| RefSeq (mRNA) | NM_001256030; NM_001778 | NM_007649; NM_001360767 |
| RefSeq (protein) | NP_001242959; NP_001769 | NP_031675; NP_001347696 |
| Location (UCSC) | Chr 1: 160.68 – 160.71 Mb | Chr 1: 171.51 – 171.53 Mb |
| PubMed search |
- Wikidata
| View/Edit Human | View/Edit Mouse |

CD48 antigen (cluster of differentiation 48) also known as B-lymphocyte activation marker (BLAST-1) or signaling lymphocytic activation molecule 2 (SLAMF2) is a protein that in humans is encoded by the CD48 gene.

CD48 is a member of the CD2 subfamily of the immunoglobulin superfamily (IgSF) which includes SLAM (signaling lymphocyte activation molecules) proteins, such as CD84, CD150, CD229 and CD244. CD48 is found on the surface of lymphocytes and other immune cells, dendritic cells and endothelial cells, and participates in activation and differentiation pathways in these cells.

CD48 was the first B-cell-specific cellular differentiation antigen identified in transformed B lymphoblasts.

== Structure ==
The gene for CD48 is located in chromosome 1q23 and contains four exons, each exon encoding one of the four domains of CD48: signal peptide, variable (V) domain, constant 2 (C2) domain and the glycophosphatidylinositol anchor (GPI anchor). The cDNA sequence of 1137 nucleotides encodes a 243 amino acid polypeptide of about 45 kDa. It consists of a 26 amino acid signal peptide, 194 amino acids of mature CD48 (V and C2 domains) and the C-terminal 23 amino acid segment comprising the GPI anchor. The GPI linkage of CD48 to the cell surface is through serine residue 220. CD48 does not have a transmembrane domain, however, but is held at the cell surface by a GPI anchor via a C-terminal domain which can be cleaved to yield a soluble form of the receptor. The CD48 protein is heavily glycosylated, with five possible asparagine-linked glycosylation sites at positions 40, 44, 104, 162 and 189, respectively. Approximately 35-40% of the total molecular weight is attributed to the carbohydrate side chains.

== Interactions ==
CD48 was found to have a very low affinity for CD2 with dissociation constant ($K_{D}$) < 0.5 mM. It was found that the preferred ligand of CD48 is 2B4 (CD244), which is also a member of the CD2 subfamily SLAM of IgSF expressed on natural killer cells (NK cells) and other leukocytes. The affinity of CD244 for CD48 is at $K_{D}$ = 8 μM which is about 5 - 10 times stronger than for CD2.

== Function ==
=== Cell distribution ===
CD48 is expressed on all peripheral blood lymphocytes (PBL) including T cells, B cells, NK cells and thymocytes. It is also found on the surface of activated T cells, mast cells, monocytes and granulocytes. Like all other GPI anchor protein (GPI-AP), CD48 is deficient in erythrocytes (red blood cells).

=== T-cell activation ===
CD48 and CD2 molecular coupling together with other interaction pairs of CD28 and CD80, TCR and peptide-MHC and LFA-1 and ICAM-1 contribute to the formation of an immunological synapse between a T cell and an antigen-presenting cell. CD48 interaction with CD2 has been shown to promote lipid raft formation, T cell activation and the formation of caveolae for macrophages through cell signal transduction via GPI moieties.

== Clinical significance ==
CD48 is being investigated amongst other markers in research on inflammation markers and therapies for HIV/AIDS.

Heterozygous germline mutation in a patient was associated with a recurrent inflammatory syndrome resembling hemophagocytic lymphohistiocytosis.

== See also ==
- Cluster of differentiation
