= SLAMF6 =

Protein-coding gene in humans

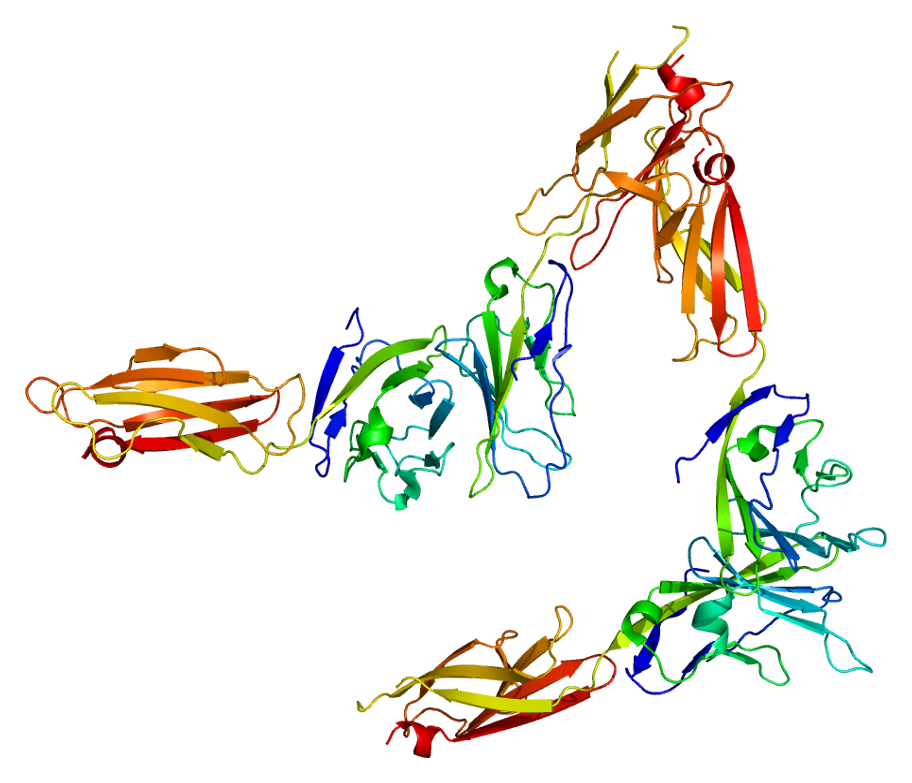

Identifiers
- Aliases: SLAMF6, CD352, KALI, KALIb, Ly108, NTB-A, NTBA, SF2000, SLAM family member 6
- External IDs: OMIM: 606446; MGI: 1353620; GeneCards: SLAMF6
Available structures
PDB	Ortholog search: PDBe RCSB
PDB	List of PDB id codes 2IF7

Gene location (Human)
Chr.	Chromosome 1 (human)
Band	1q23.2-q23.3	Start	160,485,030 bp
Band	1q23.2-q23.3	End	160,523,262 bp

Gene location (Mouse)
Chr.	Chromosome 1 (mouse)
Band	1 H3|1 79.54 cM	Start	171,745,082 bp
Band	1 H3|1 79.54 cM	End	171,780,737 bp
RNA expression pattern
Bgee	Human / Mouse (ortholog); Top expressed in: granulocyte; lymph node; spleen; appendix; blood; bone marrow cell; superficial temporal artery; gallbladder; mucosa of transverse colon; rectum / Top expressed in: thymus; spleen; lymph node; blood; mesenteric lymph nodes; gastrula; granulocyte; submandibular gland; subcutaneous adipose tissue; embryo; More reference expression data
BioGPS	n/a
Gene ontology
Molecular function	protein binding
Cellular component	integral component of membrane; plasma membrane; extracellular exosome; membrane
Biological process	natural killer cell proliferation; immune system process; positive regulation of interferon-gamma production; positive regulation of interleukin-17 production; innate immune response; positive regulation of natural killer cell mediated cytotoxicity; adaptive immune response; T-helper 17 cell lineage commitment; regulation of immune response; natural killer cell differentiation
Sources:Amigo / QuickGO
Orthologs
Databases	NCBI: entry; OMA: entry
Species	Human	Mouse
Entrez	114836	30925
Ensembl	ENSG00000162739	ENSMUSG00000015314
UniProt	Q96DU3	Q9ET39
RefSeq (mRNA)	NM_052931; NM_001184714; NM_001184715; NM_001184716	NM_030710; NM_001347186; NM_001347187
RefSeq (protein)	NP_001171643; NP_001171644; NP_001171645; NP_443163	NP_001334115; NP_001334116; NP_109635
Location (UCSC)	Chr 1: 160.49 – 160.52 Mb	Chr 1: 171.75 – 171.78 Mb
PubMed search
- Wikidata
View/Edit Human	View/Edit Mouse

SLAM family member 6 is a protein that in humans is encoded by the SLAMF6 gene.

The protein encoded by this gene is a type I transmembrane protein, belonging to the CD2 subfamily of the immunoglobulin superfamily. This encoded protein is expressed on natural killer (NK), T, and B lymphocytes. It undergoes tyrosine phosphorylation and associates with the Src homology 2 domain-containing protein (SH2D1A) as well as with SH2 domain-containing phosphatases (SHPs). It may function as a coreceptor in the process of NK cell activation. It can also mediate inhibitory signals in NK cells from X-linked lymphoproliferative patients.
