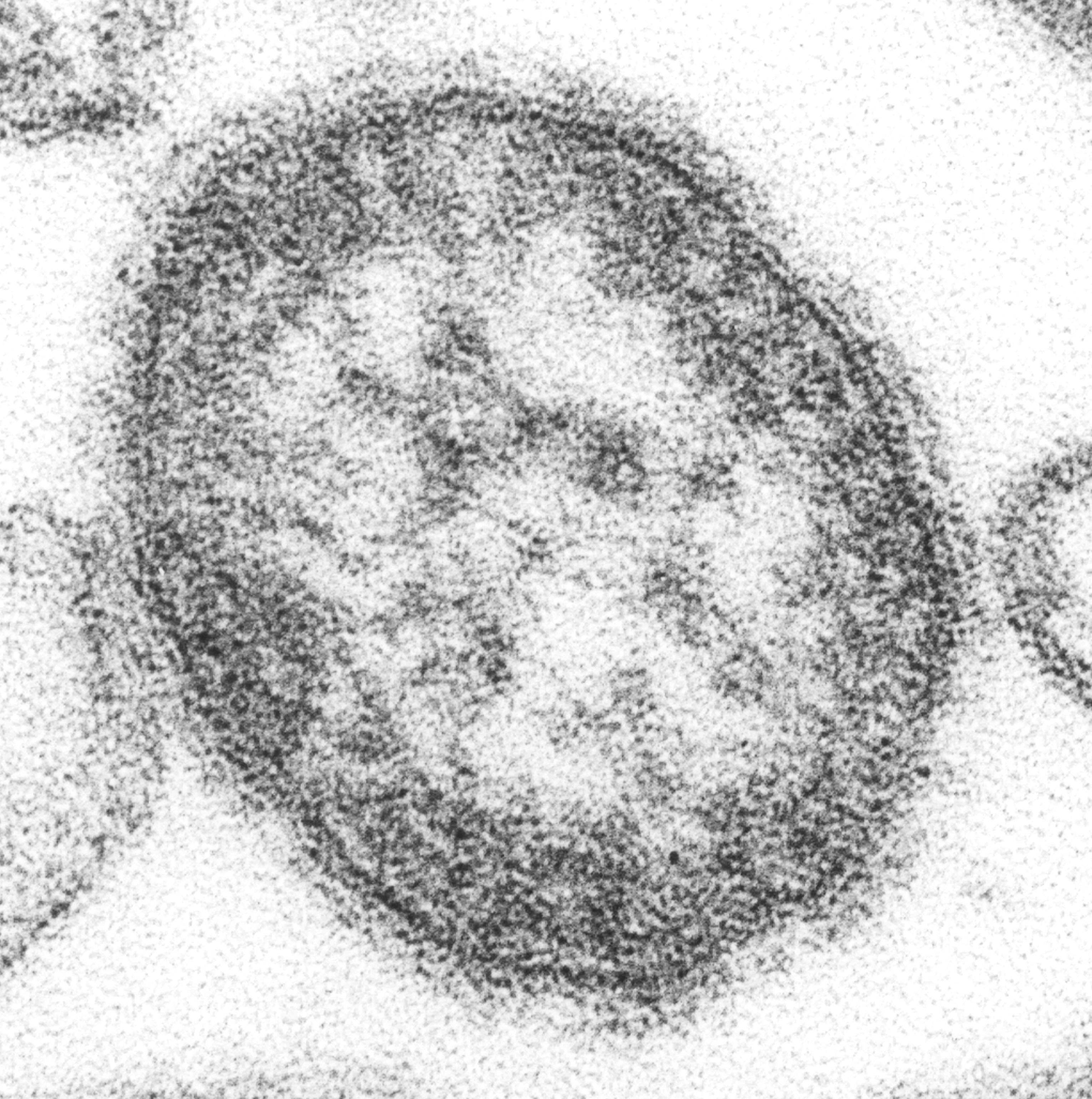
- Measles morbillivirus electron micrograph

Virus classification
- (unranked): Virus
- Realm: Riboviria
- Kingdom: Orthornavirae
- Phylum: Negarnaviricota
- Class: Monjiviricetes
- Order: Mononegavirales
- Family: Paramyxoviridae
- Genus: Morbillivirus
- Species: Morbillivirus hominis

Synonyms
- Measles virus (MV); Measles morbillivirus (MeV)

= Measles virus =

Morbillivirus hominis

Species of virus

The measles virus (MV) (scientific name Morbillivirus hominis), is a single-stranded, negative-sense, enveloped, non-segmented RNA virus of the genus Morbillivirus in the family Paramyxoviridae. It is the cause of measles. Humans are the natural hosts of the virus; no animal reservoirs are known to exist.

== Disease ==
The virus causes measles, a highly contagious disease transmitted by respiratory aerosols that triggers a temporary but severe immunosuppression. Symptoms include fever, cough, runny nose, inflamed eyes and a generalized, maculopapular, erythematous rash and a pathognomonic Koplik spot seen on buccal mucosa opposite to lower 1st and 2nd molars. The virus is spread by coughing and sneezing via close personal contact or direct contact with secretions.

== Replication cycle ==
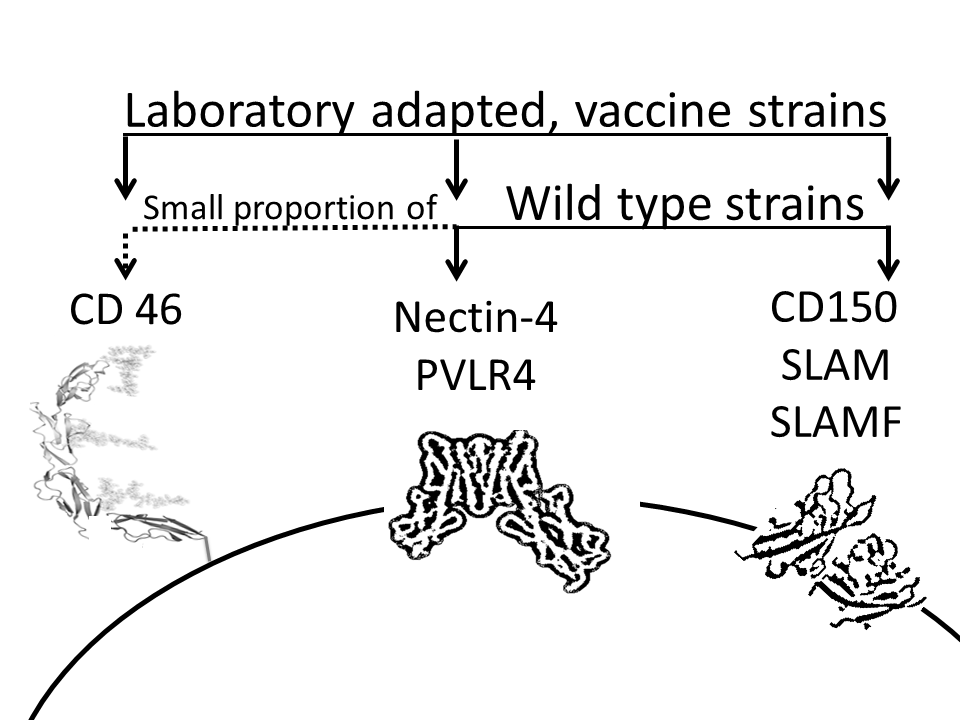
Measles morbillivirus cell entry receptors.

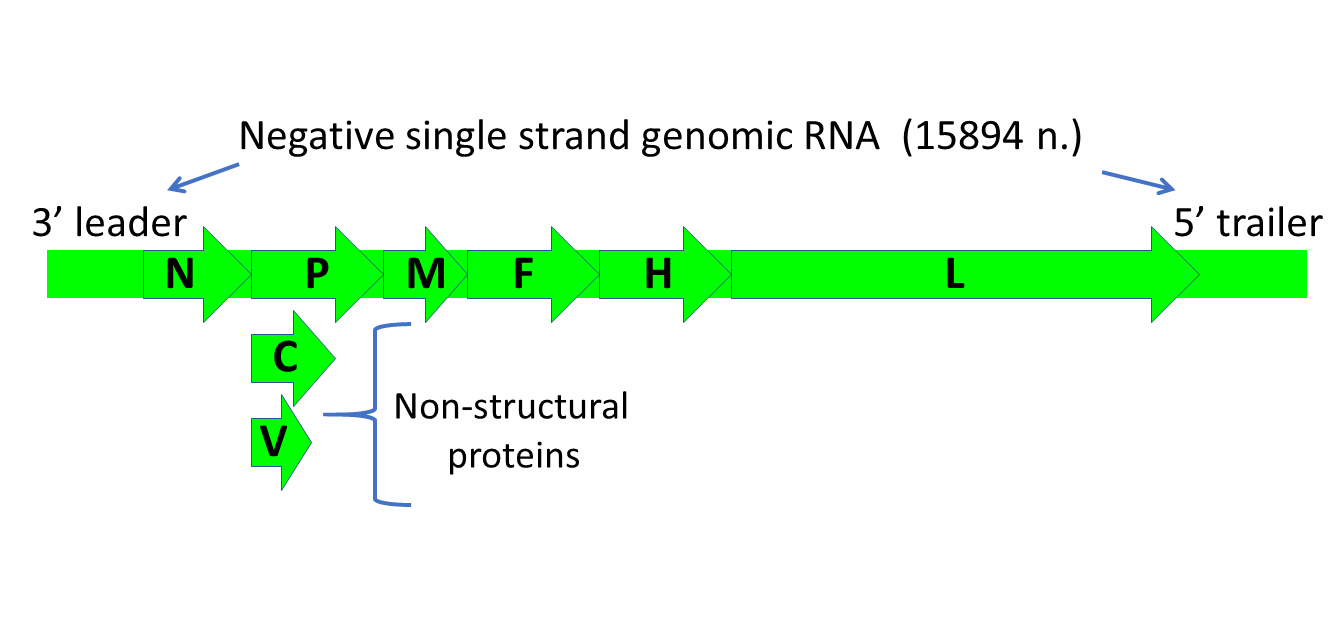
Measles morbillivirus genome structure

=== Entry ===
The measles virus has two envelope glycoproteins on the viral surface – hemagglutinin (H) and membrane fusion protein (F). These proteins are responsible for host cell binding and invasion. The H protein mediates receptor attachment, and the F protein causes fusion of viral envelope and cellular membrane. Also, the F protein can cause infected cells to directly fuse with neighboring uninfected cells forming syncytia. Three receptors for the H protein have been identified to date: complement regulatory molecule CD46, the signaling lymphocyte activation molecule (SLAMF1) and the cell adhesion molecule Nectin-4. For wild type and vaccine strains, extracellular domains of CD150 (SLAM or SLAMF1) and/or of nectin-4 (also called Poliovirus-Receptor-Like 4 (PVRL4)) mainly work as cell entry receptors. A minor fraction of wild type virus strains and all modern vaccine strains derived from the Edmonston strain also use CD46.

=== Genome replication and viral assembly ===
Once the virus has entered a host cell, its strand of negative sense ssRNA is used as a template to create a positive sense copy using the RNA-dependent RNA polymerase that's included in the virion. Then this copy is used to create a new negative copy, and so on, to create many copies of the ssRNA. The positive sense ssRNA is then mass translated by host ribosomes, producing all viral proteins. The viruses are then assembled from their proteins and negative sense ssRNA, and the cell will lyse, discharging the new viral particles and restarting the cycle.

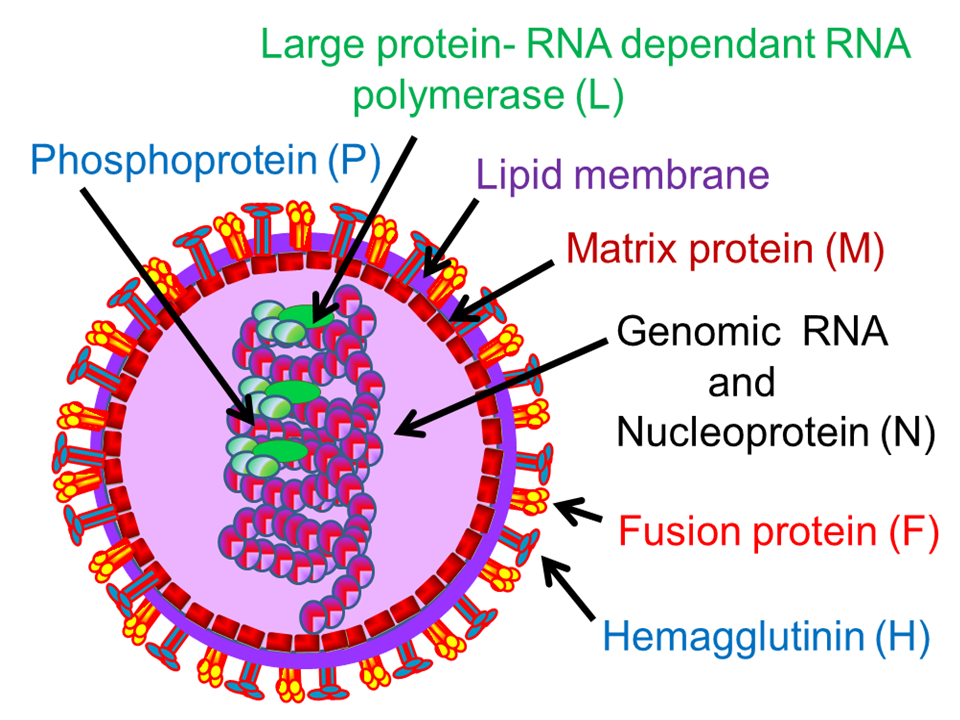
Measles morbillivirus virion structure

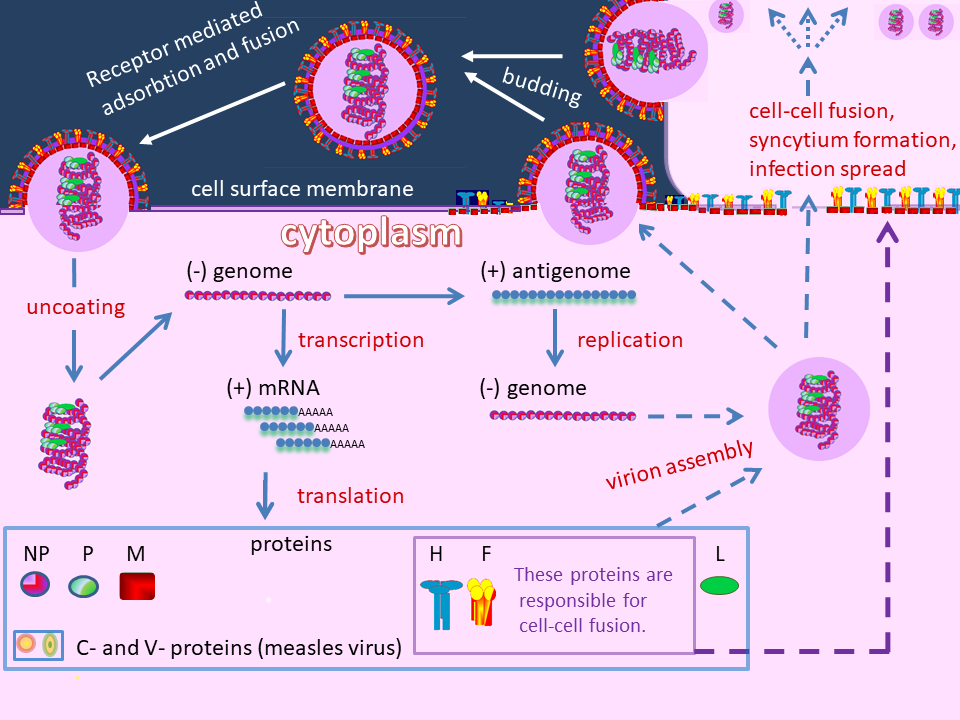
Measles morbillivirus life cycle

== Genome and virion structure ==
The RNA genome of the measles virus is about 16,000 bases in length and encodes 6 main proteins: Nucleoprotein (N), Phosphoprotein (P), Matrix protein (M), Fusion protein (F), Hemagglutinin (H), and Large Protein (L), which represents RNA dependent RNA polymerase (RdRp). The viral genome also codes two non-structural proteins C and V. These non-structural proteins are innate immunity antagonists; they help the virus to escape host immune response. Inside the virion genomic RNA is forming complex with N, L and P proteins. N, P and M proteins regulate RNA synthesis by RdRp. The virus is enveloped by a lipid membrane and glycoproteins H and F are virion surface proteins that are associated with this lipid membrane.

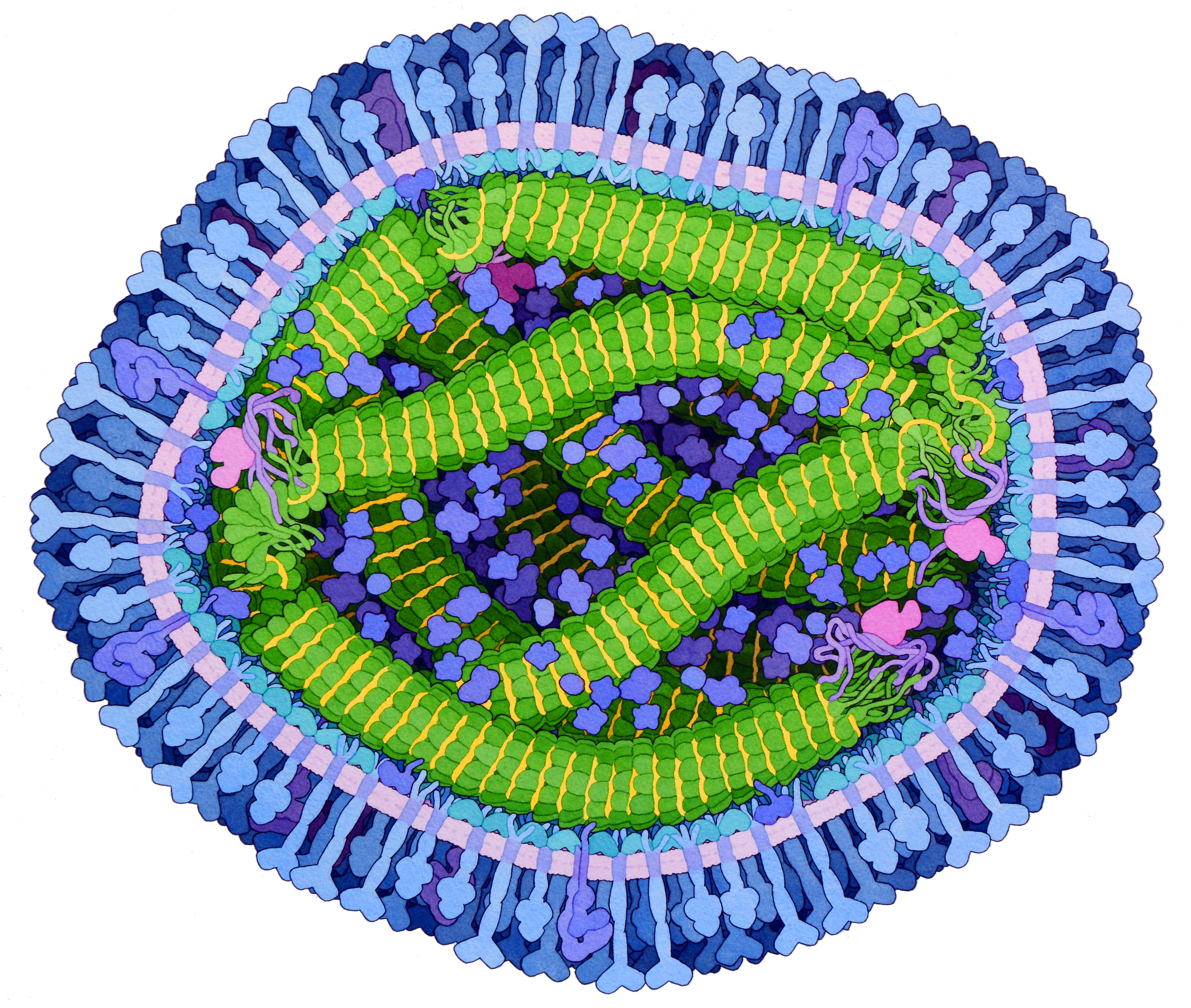
Artist's impression of a cross-section through a measles virus

== Evolution ==
The measles virus evolved from the now eradicated rinderpest virus which infected cattle. Sequence analysis has suggested that the two viruses most probably diverged in the 11th and 12th centuries, though the periods as early as the 5th century fall within the 95% confidence interval of these calculations.

Other analysis has suggested that the divergence may be even older because of the technique's tendency to underestimate ages when strong purifying selection is in action. There is some linguistic evidence for an earlier origin within the seventh century. The current epidemic strain evolved at the beginning of the 20th century—most probably between 1908 and 1943.

== Genotypes ==
The measles virus genome is typically 15,894 nucleotides long and encodes eight proteins. The WHO currently recognises 8 clades of measles (A–H). Subtypes are designed with numerals—A1, D2 etc. Currently, 23 subtypes are recognised. The 450 nucleotides that code for the C‐terminal 150 amino acids of N are the minimum amount of sequence data required for genotyping a measles virus isolate. The genotyping scheme was introduced in 1998 and extended in 2002 and 2003.

Despite the variety of measles genotypes, there is only one measles serotype. Antibodies to measles bind to the hemagglutinin protein. Thus, antibodies against one genotype (such as the vaccine strain) protect against all other genotypes.

The major genotypes differ between countries and the status of measles circulation within that country or region. Endemic transmission of measles virus was interrupted in the United States and Australia by 2000 and the Americas by 2002.

== Infection ==
In the early stages of infection, the measles virus via CD150 (SLAMF1) receptor infects immune cells located in the host respiratory tract such as macrophages and dendritic cells. They transmit the virus to the lymphoid organs, from which it spreads systemically. In the later stages of infection, the virus infects other immune cell types, including B cells and T lymphocytes also via SLAMF1 receptor. In addition, it infects epithelial cells located in the airways. These cells become infected via nectin-4 receptor and by cell to cell contacts with infected immune cells. The infection of epithelial cells allows the virus to be released via the airstream.

Measles has historically been considered to be the most contagious virus known, with an R0 (Basic reproduction number) of about 12–18, meaning that each infected person typically infects 12–18 other people.

== See also ==
- Bordetella pertussis
- Varicella zoster virus
- Mumps virus
- Rubella virus
- Immune memory
