= CD244 =

Protein found in humans

Identifiers
- Aliases: CD244, 2B4, NAIL, NKR2B4, Nmrk, SLAMF4, CD244 molecule
- External IDs: OMIM: 605554; MGI: 109294; GeneCards: CD244
Available structures
PDB	Ortholog search: PDBe RCSB
PDB	List of PDB id codes 1Z2K, 2PTT, 2PTU

Gene location (Human)
Chr.	Chromosome 1 (human)
Band	1q23.3	Start	160,830,160 bp
Band	1q23.3	End	160,862,887 bp

Gene location (Mouse)
Chr.	Chromosome 1 (mouse)
Band	1 H3|1 79.52 cM	Start	171,386,761 bp
Band	1 H3|1 79.52 cM	End	171,437,314 bp
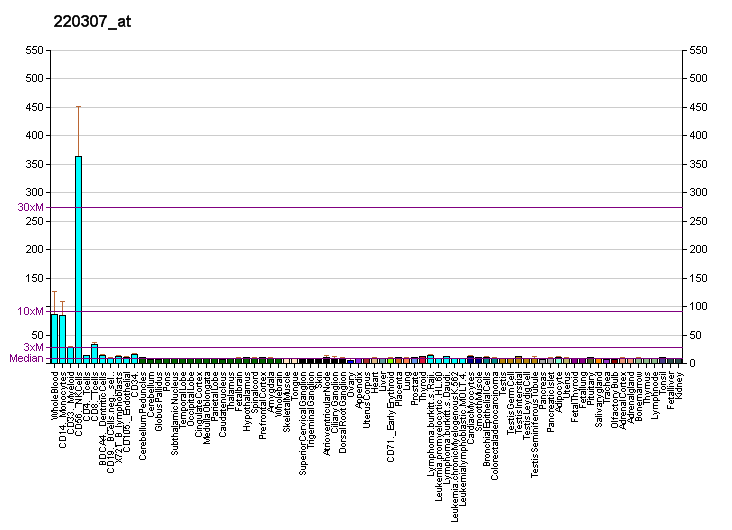
RNA expression pattern
Bgee	Human / Mouse (ortholog); Top expressed in: granulocyte; monocyte; blood; testicle; spleen; bone marrow; bone marrow cell; lymph node; appendix; right lobe of liver / Top expressed in: granulocyte; blood; spleen; Paneth cell; pharynx; bone marrow; decidua; duodenum; jejunum; crypt of lieberkuhn of small intestine; More reference expression data
BioGPS	More reference expression data
Gene ontology
Molecular function	MHC class I protein binding; protein binding; signaling receptor activity
Cellular component	plasma membrane; membrane; integral component of membrane; external side of plasma membrane
Biological process	innate immune response; positive regulation of granzyme B production; immune system process; leukocyte migration; adaptive immune response; signal transduction; positive regulation of inositol phosphate biosynthetic process; immune response; natural killer cell activation involved in immune response
Sources:Amigo / QuickGO
Orthologs
Databases	NCBI: entry; OMA: entry
Species	Human	Mouse
Entrez	51744	18106
Ensembl	ENSG00000122223	ENSMUSG00000004709
UniProt	Q9BZW8	Q07763
RefSeq (mRNA)	NM_001166663; NM_001166664; NM_016382	NM_018729
RefSeq (protein)	NP_001160135; NP_001160136; NP_057466	NP_061199
Location (UCSC)	Chr 1: 160.83 – 160.86 Mb	Chr 1: 171.39 – 171.44 Mb
PubMed search
- Wikidata
View/Edit Human	View/Edit Mouse

CD244 (Cluster of Differentiation 244) also known as 2B4 or SLAMF4 is a protein that in humans is encoded by the CD244 gene.

CD244 is a type-I transmembrane protein belonging to the signaling lymphocytic activation molecule family of receptors (SLAMF) which are expressed in different types of hematopoietic cells. CD244 plays a role in the regulation of the immune system.

A ligand of CD244 is CD48 (SLAMF2). CD48 also belongs to the SLAMF, it does not have an intracellular domain and it is anchored to the plasma membrane by a GPI-anchor. Only these two receptors from the SLAMF mediate heterophilic interactions.

== Gene ==
The receptor CD244 is encoded by the CD244 gene located on the long arm of human chromosome 1. Alternatively spliced transcript variants encoding different isoforms have been found for this gene. CD244 was first described in NK cells but it is also expressed in monocytes, basophils, eosinophils, mast cells, dendritic cells, and T cells.

== Structure ==
The receptor is composed of intracellular, transmembrane, and extracellular domains. The intracellular domain contains four intracellular tyrosine-based switch motives (ITSMs) and interacts with SH2 domain-containing proteins which are involved in the signaling and determine whether it will be activating or inhibitory. The extracellular region of the receptor is composed of one Ig variable-like domain and one Ig constant 2-like domain.

== Function ==
CD244 can function as an activating or inhibitory receptor. The expression and availability of an adaptor protein SAP determine whether the signal is activating or inhibitory. The inhibitory signal is mediated by binding of phosphatases SHP1, SHP2, SHIP-1 or the kinase CsK on the third ITSM. Activating signaling is associated with the adaptor protein SAP. SAP binds to phosphorylated tyrosines in ITSMs. Then it binds to the kinase Fyn and that enhances downstream signaling. Binding of EAT2 is associated with both the activating and the inhibitory signal.

CD244 is expressed in all types of NK cells, and it activates their cytotoxicity and IFNγ production. It is also expressed in a subset of effector and effector memory CD8+ T cells where the activating signaling via CD244 enhances their proliferation and cytotoxic effect.

== Role of CD244 in viral infections ==
NK cells and CD8+ T cells play a crucial role in antiviral immunity. The activating signaling via CD244 leads to the enhancement of their cytolytic activity that they use for killing infected cells. The expression of CD244 is increased but the expression of SAP is decreased during some chronic viral infections, such as HIV, HBV and HCV, and that is associated with the inhibitory signal and the exhaustion of CD8+ T cells.

== Role of CD244 in cancer ==
NK cells, T cells, dendritic cells, and myeloid-derived suppressor cells in the tumor microenvironment express CD244. The type of the signal is determined by the ratio of expressed CD244 and adaptor protein SAP. However, inhibitory signaling has been shown to predominate in the tumor-associated immune cells.

NK cells and CD8+ T cells use their cytolytic activity to kill tumor cells. Increased CD244 expression in these cells is associated with the inhibitory signal and the exhaustion of the cells. That leads to the impaired antitumor immunity caused by decreased cytotoxicity and proliferation of NK cells and CD8+ T cells. Dendritic cells are important antigen presenting cells. CD244 expression in dendritic cells is also associated with the inhibitory signal due to the low expression of SAP and therefore, they have decreased production of proinflammatory cytokines and reduced ability to activate NK cells and T cells. Myeloid-derived suppressor cells are suppressive cells also found in tumors. Their increased number in the tumor is associated with the progression of the disease. It is known that CD244 signaling in these cells enhances their immunosuppressive capacity resulting in the reduced immune response against tumors.

== See also ==
- Cluster of differentiation
