= Chromosome 1 open reading frame 162 =

Protein found in humans

C1orf162

Identifiers
- Aliases: C1orf162, chromosome 1 open reading frame 162
- External IDs: MGI: 3588284; HomoloGene: 45482; GeneCards: C1orf162; OMA:C1orf162 - orthologs

Gene location (Human)
Chr.	Chromosome 1 (human)
Band	1p13.2	Start	111,473,792 bp
Band	1p13.2	End	111,478,512 bp

Gene location (Mouse)
Chr.	Chromosome 3 (mouse)
Band	3|3 F2.2	Start	105,831,674 bp
Band	3|3 F2.2	End	105,839,980 bp
RNA expression pattern
Bgee	Human / Mouse (ortholog); Top expressed in: granulocyte; monocyte; spleen; right lung; blood; appendix; bone marrow; upper lobe of left lung; lymph node; trabecular bone / Top expressed in: granulocyte; blood; spleen; zygote; bone marrow; secondary oocyte; primary oocyte; mesenteric lymph nodes; morula; stroma of bone marrow; More reference expression data
BioGPS	n/a
Orthologs
Species	Human	Mouse
Entrez	128346	433638
Ensembl	ENSG00000143110	ENSMUSG00000074342
UniProt	Q8NEQ5	Q3U7U4
RefSeq (mRNA)	NM_001300834; NM_001300835; NM_174896	NM_001033780
RefSeq (protein)	NP_001287763; NP_001287764; NP_777556	NP_001028952
Location (UCSC)	Chr 1: 111.47 – 111.48 Mb	Chr 3: 105.83 – 105.84 Mb
PubMed search
- Wikidata
View/Edit Human	View/Edit Mouse

Chromosome 1 open reading frame 162 is a protein that in humans is encoded by the C1orf162 gene. It has been found to be hypomethylated in instances of gastric cancer.

== Gene ==
The gene is located at p13.2 on chromosome 1 in humans and contains 8 exons. It is 11,026 bases long and is oriented on the plus strand.

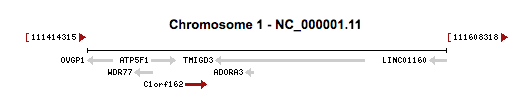
Illustration of genomic context of C1orf162.

== mRNA ==
Three transcript variants have been identified. Isoform 1 is the longest transcript and encodes the longest isoform. Isoform 2 uses an alternate in-frame splice site and is shorter than isoform 1. Isoform 3 lacks an alternate in-frame exon and is shorter compared to isoform 1. There are six stem loops in the 5' untranslated region and five stem loops in the 3' untranslated region.

== Protein ==
The predicted molecular weight of the protein C1orf162 is 16.9 kdal. Its isoelectric point is approximately 9.2 in mammals. A single transmembrane region is conserved across species. The protein is predicted to localize mainly in the nucleus. The protein is predicted to be myristoylated.

Illustration of transmembrane region of C1orf162.

== Expression ==
C1orf162 is not ubiquitously expressed in humans. According to microarray-assessed tissue expression patterns, C1orf162 is most highly expressed in bone marrow, lung, fetal liver, lymph node, spleen, and thymus in normal human tissues. Staining of normal tissues has found high levels of RNA expression in bone marrow, lymph node, spleen, and lung tissue, which coincides with microarray-assessed expression patterns.

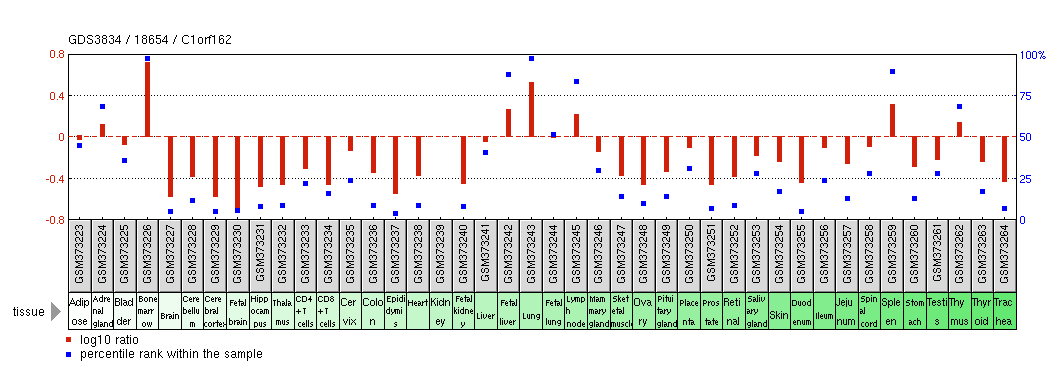
Expression of C1orf162 in normal human tissues.

== Clinical Significance ==
One study found the protein to be one of three hypomethylated proteins in instances of gastric cancer.

== Homology ==
The gene has no known paralogs. Orthologs have been noted in many mammal species in addition to a few birds and reptiles. The transmembrane region of the protein is highly conserved across species. No orthologs have been identified in fish, insects, or prokaryotes.
