= Immunoglobulin superfamily =

Large protein superfamily of cell surface and soluble proteins

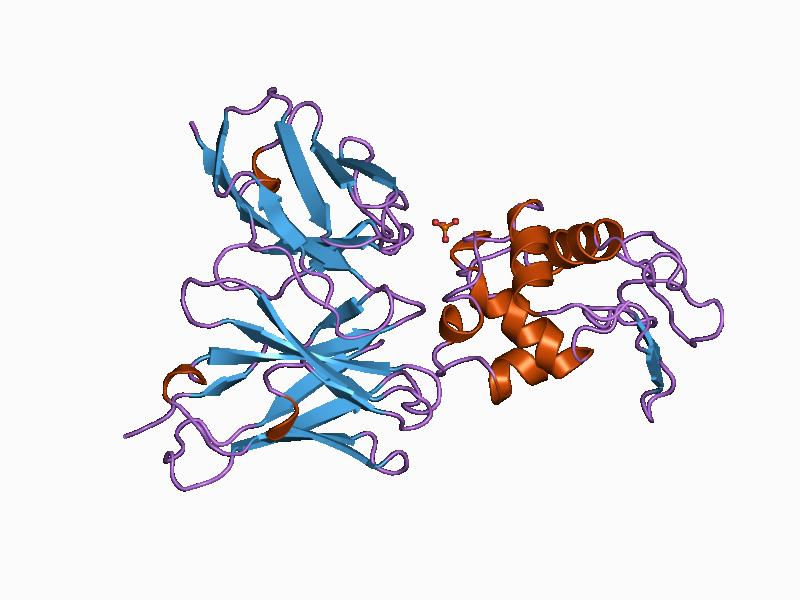
- Antibody in complex with hen egg white lysozyme.

Identifiers
- Symbol: IgSF
- Pfam: PF00047
- Pfam clan: CL0159
- ECOD: 11.1.1
- InterPro: IPR013151
- PROSITE: PS50835
- SCOP2: 1tlk / SCOPe / SUPFAM
- OPM superfamily: 193
- OPM protein: 3bib
- CDD: cd00096
- Membranome: 2
Available protein structures:
- PDB: IPR013151 PF00047 (ECOD; PDBsum)
- AlphaFold: IPR013151; PF00047

The immunoglobulin superfamily (IgSF) is a large protein superfamily of cell surface and soluble proteins that are involved in the recognition, binding, or adhesion processes of cells. Molecules are categorized as members of this superfamily based on shared structural features with immunoglobulins (also known as antibodies); they all possess a domain known as an immunoglobulin domain or fold. Members of the IgSF include cell surface antigen receptors, co-receptors and co-stimulatory molecules of the immune system, molecules involved in antigen presentation to lymphocytes, cell adhesion molecules, certain cytokine receptors and intracellular muscle proteins. They are commonly associated with roles in the immune system. Otherwise, the sperm-specific protein IZUMO1, a member of the immunoglobulin superfamily, has also been identified as the only sperm membrane protein essential for sperm-egg fusion.

== Immunoglobulin domains ==
Proteins of the IgSF possess a structural domain known as an immunoglobulin (Ig) domain. Ig domains are named after the immunoglobulin molecules. They contain about 70-110 amino acids and are categorized according to their size and function. Ig-domains possess a characteristic Ig-fold, which has a sandwich-like structure formed by two sheets of antiparallel beta strands. Interactions between hydrophobic amino acids on the inner side of the sandwich and highly conserved disulfide bonds formed between cysteine residues in the B and F strands, stabilize the Ig-fold.

== Classification ==
The Ig like domains can be classified as IgV, IgC1, IgC2, or IgI.

Most Ig domains are either variable (IgV) or constant (IgC).

- IgV: IgV domains with 9 beta strands are generally longer than IgC domains with 7 beta strands.
- IgC1 and IgC2: Ig domains of some members of the IgSF resemble IgV domains in the amino acid sequence, yet are similar in size to IgC domains. These are called IgC2 domains, while standard IgC domains are called IgC1 domains.
- IgI: Other Ig domains exist that are called intermediate (I) domains.

== Members ==
The Ig domain was reported to be the most populous family of proteins in the human genome with 765 members identified. Members of the family can be found even in the bodies of animals with a simple physiological structure such as poriferan sponges. They have also been found in bacteria, where their presence is likely to be due to divergence from a shared ancestor of eukaryotic immunoglobulin superfamily domains.

Members of the immunoglobulin superfamily
Molecule function/category	Examples	Description
Antigen receptors	Antibodies or immunoglobulins: IgA IgD IgE IgG IgM; T-cell receptor chains	Antigen receptors found on the surface of T and B lymphocytes in all jawed vertebrates belong to the IgSF. Immunoglobulin molecules (the antigen receptors of B cells) are the founding members of the IgSF. In humans, there are five distinct types of immunoglobulin molecule all containing a heavy chain with four Ig domains and a light chain with two Ig domains. The antigen receptor of T cells is the T-cell receptor (TCR), which is composed of two chains, either the TCR-alpha and -beta chains, or the TCR-delta and gamma chains. All TCR chains contain two Ig domains in the extracellular portion; one IgV domain at the N-terminus and one IgC1 domain adjacent to the cell membrane.
Antigen presenting molecules	Class I MHC; Class II MHC; beta-2 microglobulin	The ligands for TCRs are major histocompatibility complex (MHC) proteins. These come in two forms; MHC class I forms a dimer with a molecule called beta-2 microglobulin (β2M) and interacts with the TCR on cytotoxic T cells and MHC class II has two chains (alpha and beta) that interact with the TCR on helper T cells. MHC class I, MHC class II and β2M molecules all possess Ig domains and are therefore also members of the IgSF.
Co-receptors	CD4; CD8; CD19	Co-receptors and accessory molecules: Other molecules on the surfaces of T cells also interact with MHC molecules during TCR engagement. These are known as co-receptors. In lymphocyte populations, the co-receptor CD4 is found on helper T cells and the co-receptor CD8 is found on cytotoxic T cells. CD4 has four Ig domains in its extracellular portion and functions as a monomer. CD8, in contrast, functions as a dimer with either two identical alpha chains or, more typically, with an alpha and beta chain. CD8-alpha and CD8-beta each has one extracellular IgV domain in its extracellular portion. A co-receptor complex is also used by the BCR, including CD19, an IgSF molecule with two IgC2-domains.
Antigen receptor accessory molecules	CD3-γ, -δ and -ε chains; CD79a and CD79b	A further molecule is found on the surface of T cells that is also involved in signaling from the TCR. CD3 is a molecule that helps to transmit a signal from the TCR following its interaction with MHC molecules. Three different chains make up CD3 in humans, the gamma chain, delta chain and epsilon chain, all of which are IgSF molecules with a single Ig domain. Similar to the situation with T cells, B cells also have cell surface co-receptors and accessory molecules that assist with cell activation by the B Cell Receptor (BCR)/immunoglobulin. Two chains are used or signaling, CD79a and CD79b that both possess a single Ig domain.
Co-stimulatory or inhibitory molecules	CD28; CD80 and CD86 (also known as B7.1 and B7.2 molecules)	Co-stimulatory or inhibitory molecules: Co-stimulatory and inhibitory signaling receptors and ligands control the activation, expansion and effector functions of cells. One major group of IgSF co-stimulatory receptors are molecules of the CD28 family; CD28, CTLA-4, program death-1 (PD-1), the B- and T-lymphocyte attenuator (BTLA, CD272), and the inducible T-cell co-stimulator (ICOS, CD278); and their IgSF ligands belong to the B7 family; CD80 (B7-1), CD86 (B7-2), ICOS ligand, PD-L1 (B7-H1), PD-L2 (B7-DC), B7-H3, and B7-H4 (B7x/B7-S1).
Receptors on Natural killer cells	Killer-cell immunoglobulin-like receptors (KIR)	
Receptors on Leukocytes	Leukocyte immunoglobulin-like receptors (LILR)	
IgSF CAMs	NCAMs; ICAM-1; CD2 subset; Type IIa and Type IIb RPTPs, described in Receptor tyrosine kinases/phosphatases subsection below	CD2 subset of IgSF represented large group of homologous cell adhesion molecules (CAMs), includes CD2, CD58, CD48, CD150, CD229 and CD244.
Cytokine receptors	Interleukin-1 receptor; Colony stimulating factor 1 receptor	
Growth factor receptors	Platelet-derived growth factor receptor (PDGFR); Mast/stem cell growth factor receptor precursor (SCFR, c-kit, CD117 antigen)	
Receptor tyrosine kinases/phosphatases	Tyrosine-protein kinase receptor Tie-1 precursor; Type IIa and Type IIb Receptor protein tyrosine phosphatases (RPTPs), including, but not limited to, PTPRM, PTPRK, PTPRU, PTPRD, PTPRF	
Ig binding receptors	polymeric immunoglobulin receptor (PIGR); Some Fc receptors	
Cytoskeleton	myotilin, myopalladin, palladin; Titin, Obscurin; MYOM1, MYOM2	
Others	CD147; CD90; CD96; CD7; Butyrophilins (Btn)	
