= Coiled-coil domain containing 74A =

Protein found in humans

CCDC74A

Identifiers
- Aliases: CCDC74A, coiled-coil domain containing 74A
- External IDs: GeneCards: CCDC74A

Gene location (Human)
Chr.	Chromosome 2 (human)
Band	2q21.1	Start	131,527,675 bp
Band	2q21.1	End	131,533,666 bp
RNA expression pattern
Bgee	Human / Mouse (ortholog); Top expressed in: right uterine tube; right testis; left testis; olfactory zone of nasal mucosa; pituitary gland; right adrenal gland; left adrenal cortex; right adrenal cortex; anterior pituitary; ventricular zone / n/a; More reference expression data
BioGPS	n/a
Orthologs
Databases	NCBI: entry; OMA: entry
Species	Human	Mouse
Entrez	90557	n/a
Ensembl	ENSG00000163040	n/a
UniProt	Q96AQ1	n/a
RefSeq (mRNA)	NM_001258304; NM_001258305; NM_001258306; NM_138770; NM_001349041 NM_001349042; NM_001349043; NM_001349044; NM_001349045; NM_001349046; NM_001349047	n/a
RefSeq (protein)	NP_001245233; NP_001245234; NP_001245235; NP_620125; NP_001335970 NP_001335971; NP_001335972; NP_001335973; NP_001335974; NP_001335975; NP_001335976	n/a
Location (UCSC)	Chr 2: 131.53 – 131.53 Mb	n/a
PubMed search		n/a
- Wikidata
View/Edit Human

Coiled-coil domain containing 74A is a protein that in humans is encoded by the CCDC74A gene. The protein is most highly expressed in the testis and may play a role in developmental pathways. The gene has undergone duplication in the primate lineage within the last 9 million years, and its only true ortholog is found in Pan troglodytes.

== Gene ==
The gene locus is located on the long arm of chromosome 2 at 2q21.1, and spans 5991 base pairs. A common alternative alias is LOC90557.

== Transcript ==
The mRNA encoding the largest peptide product, isoform 6, contains 8 exons and 9 introns. It is 1842bps in length. Altogether, 11 protein isoforms have been characterized as a result of alternative splicing.

== Protein ==
The longest CCDC74A peptide product, isoform 6, is 420 amino acids in length. This protein has a predicted molecular weight of 45.9kD and a predicted isoelectric point of 10.65. The entire length of the protein is evenly enriched in lysine and arginine residues. The protein contains 2 eukaryotic coiled-coil domains of unknown function, CCDC92 and CCDC74C. Its predicted localization is to the nucleus, but the protein may shuttle between the nucleus and the cytoplasm due to the presence of both a nuclear localization signal and a nuclear export signal.

=== Secondary structure ===
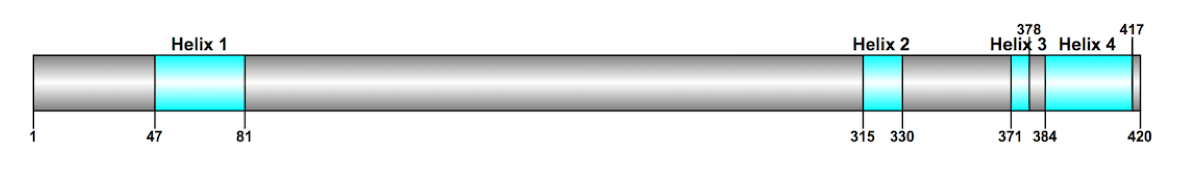
This diagram summarizes the locations of predicted alpha helix secondary structures for the human protein CCDC74A.

Predicted secondary structure for CCDC74A consists of 4 alpha helix regions, which are summarized in the table below and the diagram to the right.

Structure	Start	End
Alpha Helix 1	47	81
Alpha Helix 2	315	330
Alpha Helix 3	371	378
Alpha Helix 4	384	417

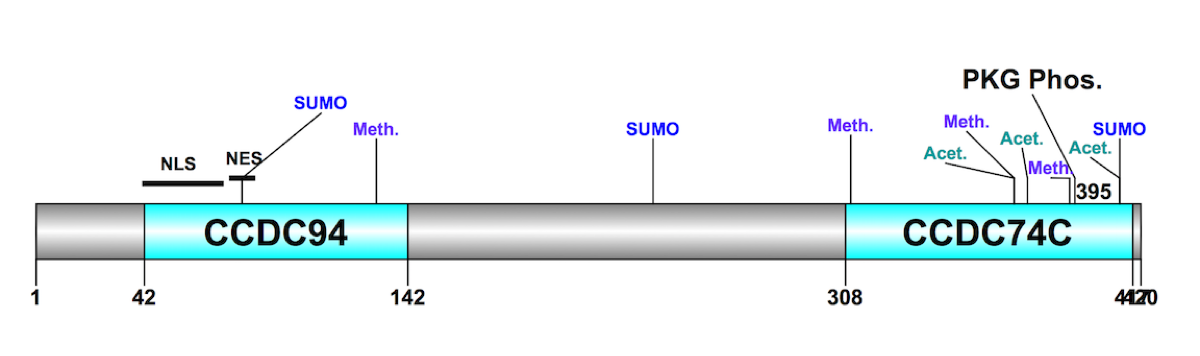
This diagram summarizes the conserved domains, signal peptides, and predicted post-translational modifications for the human protein CCDC74A.

=== Post-translational modification ===
A threonine residue (T395) which is highly conserved across Animalia orthologs may serve as a phosphorylation site by PKG kinase. Additionally, SUMOylation, methylation, and acetylation sites are predicted within highly conserved regions and may play a part in regulation. These predicted post-translational modifications and conserved domains are summarized in the diagram to the right.

== Homology ==
In humans, CCDC74A has one important paralog, CCDC74B. Gene duplication is estimated to have occurred approximately 7 million years ago (MYA). As such, the only true ortholog of CCDC74A is found in Pan troglodytes, and is not found in Gorilla gorilla. However, distant orthologs prior to gene duplication are conserved in species that diverged from humans between 92-797 MYA. This includes species as distant as Cnidaria, but excludes Porifera or species outside of the kingdom Animalia.

== Function ==
CCDC74A localization, expression, and interactions suggest that the protein may play a role in the expression of genes related to developmental and differentiation pathways, particularly during spermatogenesis.

=== Expression ===
The protein has been found most highly expressed in the testes and trachea. It is also expressed at moderate levels in the lung, brain, prostate, spinal cord, bone marrow, ovary, thymus, and thyroid gland.

=== Interactions ===
Consistent with predicted post-translational methylation, CCDC74A has been shown to interact with the lysine demethylase KDM1A through a yeast 2-hybrid assay. Additionally, through a yeast 2-hybrid assay, CCDC74A has been shown to interact with the lymphocyte activation molecule associated protein SH2D1A.

=== Clinical significance ===
In a study on androgen-independent prostate cancer, knockout of CCDC74A in androgen-dependent prostate cancer inhibited cell proliferation. Experiments in genital fibroblast cells have shown that CCDC74A expression significantly increases upon exposure to dihydrotestosterone.
