= SLAMF1 =

Protein-coding gene in humans

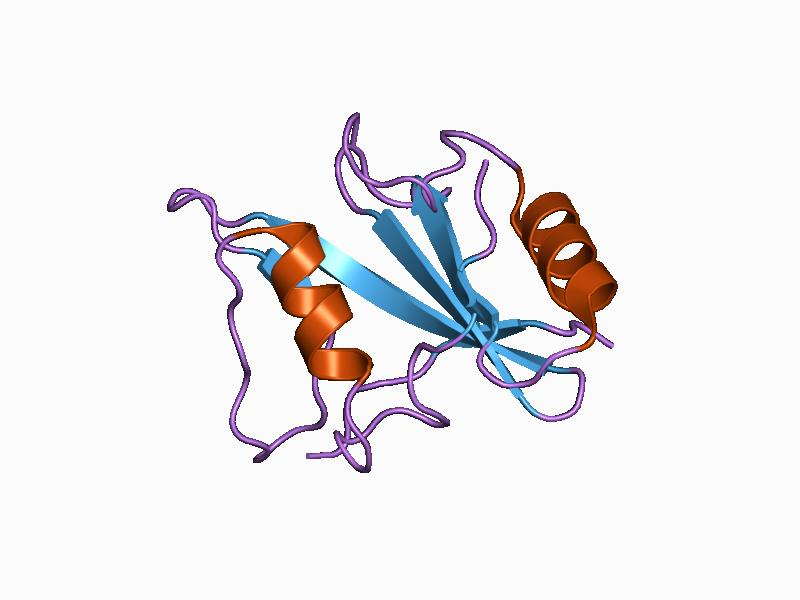

Identifiers
- Aliases: SLAMF1, CD150, CDw150, SLAM, signaling lymphocytic activation molecule family member 1
- External IDs: OMIM: 603492; MGI: 1351314; GeneCards: SLAMF1
Available structures
| PDB | Ortholog search: PDBe RCSB |
| PDB | List of PDB id codes 1M27, 1KA7, 1I3Z, 1D4T, 1D4W, 1KA6 |

Gene location (Human)
| Chr. | Chromosome 1 (human) |
| Band | 1q23.3 | Start | 160,608,106 bp |
| Band | 1q23.3 | End | 160,647,044 bp |

Gene location (Mouse)
| Chr. | Chromosome 1 (mouse) |
| Band | 1 H3|1 79.54 cM | Start | 171,594,695 bp |
| Band | 1 H3|1 79.54 cM | End | 171,628,752 bp |
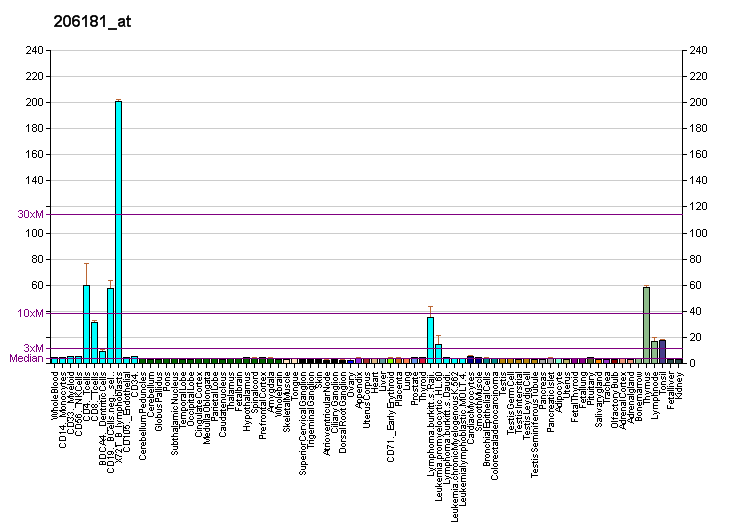
RNA expression pattern
| Bgee | Human / Mouse (ortholog); Top expressed in: thymus; lymph node; granulocyte; appendix; blood; tonsil; bone marrow cell; spleen; rectum; pancreatic ductal cell / Top expressed in: blood; thymus; zygote; secondary oocyte; primary oocyte; tibiofemoral joint; spleen; mesenteric lymph nodes; embryo; embryo; More reference expression data |
| BioGPS | More reference expression data |
Gene ontology
| Molecular function | antigen binding; virus receptor activity; protein binding; transmembrane signaling receptor activity; identical protein binding; signaling receptor activity |
| Cellular component | integral component of membrane; membrane; plasma membrane; extracellular region; cell surface; phagocytic vesicle; extracellular exosome; external side of plasma membrane |
| Biological process | adaptive immune response; immune system process; natural killer cell proliferation; T-helper 1 cell cytokine production; negative regulation of interleukin-6 production; positive regulation of JNK cascade; cell adhesion; negative regulation of CD40 signaling pathway; negative regulation of T cell cytokine production; myeloid dendritic cell activation involved in immune response; regulation of vesicle fusion; positive regulation of cell population proliferation; positive regulation of ERK1 and ERK2 cascade; phagocytosis; lymphocyte activation; viral entry into host cell; negative regulation of tumor necrosis factor production; innate immune response; regulation of catalytic activity; viral process; positive regulation of activated T cell proliferation; negative regulation of interleukin-12 production; natural killer cell differentiation; signal transduction; leukocyte chemotaxis involved in inflammatory response; positive regulation of macrophage chemotaxis; positive regulation of dendritic cell chemotaxis |
Sources:Amigo / QuickGO
Orthologs
| Databases | NCBI: entry; OMA: entry |
| Species | Human | Mouse |
| Entrez | 6504 | 27218 |
| Ensembl | ENSG00000117090 | ENSMUSG00000015316 |
| UniProt | Q13291 | Q9QUM4 |
| RefSeq (mRNA) | NM_003037; NM_001330754 | NM_013730; NM_001360898 |
| RefSeq (protein) | NP_001317683; NP_003028 | NP_038758; NP_001347827 |
| Location (UCSC) | Chr 1: 160.61 – 160.65 Mb | Chr 1: 171.59 – 171.63 Mb |
| PubMed search |
- Wikidata
| View/Edit Human | View/Edit Mouse |

Signaling lymphocytic activation molecule 1 is a protein that in humans is encoded by the SLAMF1 gene. Recently SLAMF1 has also been designated CD150 (cluster of differentiation 150).

SLAMF1 belongs to the signaling lymphocytic activation molecule family. As other receptors from this family, SLAMF1 is expressed in different types of hematopoietic cells and it plays a role in the regulation of the immune system.

== Gene ==
The gene encoding SLAMF1 receptor is located on the human chromosome 1. It consists of eight exons and seven introns. Alternative splicing of SLAMF1 transcripts results in several isoforms of the protein, including the conventional transmembrane isoform (mCD150), secreted isoform (sCD150) cytoplasmic isoform (cCD150), and the novel transmembrane isoform (nCD150).

SLAMF1 is expressed in hematopoietic stem cells. It is also used as one of the markers for their identification. Furthermore, its expression was detected in thymocytes, NKT cells, T cells, B cells, monocytes, macrophages and dendritic cells. Monocytes, macrophages and dendritic cells express SLAMF1 after their activation. The activation of T cells and plasma cell differentiation leads to the increased expression of this receptor. The interaction of SLAMF1 promoter and enhancers with the Early B-cell factor 1 (EBF1) is required for the expression of SLAMF1 gene in B cells. STAT6, IRF4, and NF-kB factors involved in the transfer of the signals from the B-cell receptor, its co-receptors and IL-4R, also play important role in the regulation of SLAMF1 expression. The expression of SLAMF1 is not restricted to immune cells and their progenitors. From non-immune cells, platelets express SLAMF1.

== Structure ==
SLAMF1 is a type I transmembrane protein belonging to the immunoglobulin superfamily. Its molecular weight is between 70 kDa and 95 kDa. The extracellular region of the receptor is composed of one Ig variable-like domain and one Ig constant 2-like domain. The intracellular region of the receptor contains two intracellular tyrosine-based switch motives (ITSMs) that interact with SH2 domain-containing proteins. However, nCD150 intracellular region differs from other isoforms of this protein, it lacks ITSMs. sCD150 isoform lacks the transmembrane domain and therefore, it can not be anchored to the cell membrane.

== Signaling ==
The receptor SLAMF1 mediates homophilic interactions as most of the receptors from the SLAMF. Signaling from SLAMF1 receptor can be activating or inhibitory. The type of the signal depends on the cell type, differentiation stage, and the combination of signals from other receptors.

SH2 domain-containing proteins, specifically adaptor proteins SAP and EAT-2, and phosphatases SHP-1, SHP-2 and SHIP, interact with ITSMs in the intracellular region of SLAMF1. Binding of SAP to ITSMs leads to the activation of the kinase Fyn that phosphorylates tyrosines of SLAMF1 and recruits downstream signaling proteins. Because of the high affinity of SAP to tyrosine phosphorylated ITSMs, it outcompetes the phosphatases which are the mediators of the inhibitory signal. Therefore, the expression and availability of SAP play a crucial role in the determination of the type of the signal.

== Function ==
SLAMF1 is involved in the regulation of thymocyte development, T cell proliferation, differentiation and T cell function, such as the cytotoxic activity of CD8+ T cells and the production of IL-4, IL-13 and IFNγ. In B cells, it regulates the proliferation and the antibody production. SLAMF1 acts as a self-ligand during the interaction between B cells and T cells and promotes lymphocyte activation.

The development of NKT cells is dependent on a signal mediated by SAP. It was found out that the homophilic interaction of SLAMF1 or SLAMF6 is required for SAP recruitment in NKT cells. This interaction mediates a secondary signal crucial for NKT cell differentiation and expansion in the thymus.

SLAMF1 expression in macrophages is associated with killing of Gram-negative bacteria. SLAMF1 acts as a bacterial sensor. It is internalized after the recognition of Gram-negative bacteria, and it plays a role in the regulation of phagosome maturation, ROS and NO production. The absence of SLAMF1 in phagocytes leads, among other things, to the disruption of cytokine production.

== Role of SLAMF1 in diseases ==
=== Viral infections ===
SLAMF1 is a receptor for Morbilliviruses. This genus of viruses includes agents causing measles in humans, rinderpest in cattle and distemper in dogs and cats. Ig variable-like domain of SLAMF1 binds to hemagglutinin on the surface of the virus and this interaction mediates the virus entry into the host cell.

=== Cancer ===
SLAMF1 is expressed in cancer cells in some types of hematologic malignancies (cutaneous T-cell lymphoma, few types of B-cell non-Hodgkin´s lymphoma, Hodgkin´s lymphoma and about 50 % of chronic lymphocytic leukemia cases). It regulates cancer cell growth and survival by activating PI3K/Akt/mTOR signaling pathway. Therefore, SLAMF1 could be used as a diagnostical and prognostic marker in these cancer types. Several cases of leukemia or Hodgkin´s lymphoma remission after measles virus infection or vaccination have been described. Therefore, SLAMF1 could be used as a target for cancer therapy which is based on the measles virus-mediated lysis of the cancer cells.

nCD150 isoform was found in tumors of the central nervous system, such as glioblastoma, anaplastic and diffuse astrocytoma and ependymoma.
