= DOK1 =

Protein-coding gene in the species Homo sapiens

Identifiers
- Aliases: DOK1, P62DOK, pp62, docking protein 1
- External IDs: OMIM: 602919; MGI: 893587; GeneCards: DOK1
Available structures
PDB	Ortholog search: PDBe RCSB
PDB	List of PDB id codes 2V76

Gene location (Human)
Chr.	Chromosome 2 (human)
Band	2p13.1	Start	74,549,026 bp
Band	2p13.1	End	74,557,551 bp

Gene location (Mouse)
Chr.	Chromosome 6 (mouse)
Band	6 C3|6 35.94 cM	Start	83,007,915 bp
Band	6 C3|6 35.94 cM	End	83,010,452 bp
RNA expression pattern
Bgee	Human / Mouse (ortholog); Top expressed in: tendon of biceps brachii; pancreatic ductal cell; monocyte; granulocyte; vena cava; blood; body of tongue; internal globus pallidus; spleen; Skeletal muscle tissue of rectus abdominis / Top expressed in: stroma of bone marrow; granulocyte; mesenteric lymph nodes; otic vesicle; spleen; fossa; calvaria; endothelial cell of lymphatic vessel; thymus; condyle; More reference expression data
BioGPS	n/a
Gene ontology
Molecular function	protein binding
Cellular component	perinuclear region of cytoplasm; nucleus; cytoplasm; cytosol
Biological process	cell surface receptor signaling pathway; Ras protein signal transduction; intracellular signal transduction; signal transduction; transmembrane receptor protein tyrosine kinase signaling pathway; positive regulation of epidermal growth factor receptor signaling pathway; axon guidance; macrophage colony-stimulating factor signaling pathway
Sources:Amigo / QuickGO
Orthologs
Databases	NCBI: entry; OMA: entry
Species	Human	Mouse
Entrez	1796	13448
Ensembl	ENSG00000115325	ENSMUSG00000068335
UniProt	Q99704	P97465
RefSeq (mRNA)	NM_001197260; NM_001381; NM_001318866; NM_001318867; NM_001318868 NM_001318869	NM_001291799; NM_010070
RefSeq (protein)	NP_001184189; NP_001305795; NP_001305796; NP_001305797; NP_001305798 NP_001372	NP_001278728; NP_034200
Location (UCSC)	Chr 2: 74.55 – 74.56 Mb	Chr 6: 83.01 – 83.01 Mb
PubMed search
- Wikidata
View/Edit Human	View/Edit Mouse

Docking protein 1 is a protein that in humans is encoded by the DOK1 gene.

== Function ==
Docking protein 1 is constitutively tyrosine phosphorylated in hematopoietic progenitors isolated from chronic myelogenous leukemia (CML) patients in the chronic phase. It may be a critical substrate for p210(bcr/abl), a chimeric protein whose presence is associated with CML. Docking protein 1 contains a putative pleckstrin homology domain at the amino terminus and ten PXXP SH3 recognition motifs. Docking protein 2 binds p120 (RasGAP) from CML cells. It has been postulated to play a role in mitogenic signaling.

== Interactions ==
DOK1 has been shown to interact with:

- ABL1 and
- CD117,
- INPP5D,
- LYN,
- RASA1,
- RET,
- SH2D1A,
- SHC1, and
- TEC.
