= SLP adaptor and CSK interacting membrane protein =

Protein-coding gene in the species Homo sapiens

SCIMP

Identifiers
- Aliases: SCIMP, C17orf87, UNQ5783, SLP adaptor and CSK interacting membrane protein, SLP adapter and CSK-interacting membrane protein, IPR028181, SCIMP protein
- External IDs: OMIM: 614406; MGI: 3610314; GeneCards: SCIMP

Gene location (Human)
Chr.	Chromosome 17 (human)
Band	17p13.2	Start	5,208,920 bp
Band	17p13.2	End	5,234,860 bp

Gene location (Mouse)
Chr.	Chromosome 11 (mouse)
Band	11|11 B3	Start	70,681,758 bp
Band	11|11 B3	End	70,703,412 bp
RNA expression pattern
Bgee	Human / Mouse (ortholog); Top expressed in: monocyte; granulocyte; spleen; lymph node; appendix; blood; tonsil; gallbladder; smooth muscle tissue; duodenum / Top expressed in: spleen; bone marrow; embryo; right kidney; thymus; ileum; jejunum; colon; adrenal gland; liver; More reference expression data
BioGPS	n/a
Gene ontology
Molecular function	protein binding
Cellular component	integral component of membrane; uropod membrane; tetraspanin-enriched microdomain; membrane; leading edge membrane; immunological synapse
Biological process	meiosis I; positive regulation of ERK1 and ERK2 cascade
Sources:Amigo / QuickGO
Orthologs
Databases	NCBI: entry; OMA: entry
Species	Human	Mouse
Entrez	388325	327957
Ensembl	ENSG00000161929	ENSMUSG00000057135
UniProt	Q6UWF3	Q3UU41
RefSeq (mRNA)	NM_001271842; NM_207103; NM_001319190	NM_001045526
RefSeq (protein)	NP_001258771; NP_001306119; NP_996986	NP_001038991
Location (UCSC)	Chr 17: 5.21 – 5.23 Mb	Chr 11: 70.68 – 70.7 Mb
PubMed search
- Wikidata
View/Edit Human	View/Edit Mouse

SLP adaptor and CSK interacting membrane protein is a protein encoded by the SCIMP gene in humans. SCIMP belongs to the family of transmembrane adaptor proteins (TRAP) which do not directly associate with a receptor, such as LAT1, NTAL, LIME or LAX1. SCIMP is expressed in antigen-presenting cells (APC), namely B cells, bone marrow-derived dendritic cells and macrophages.

== Structure and interactions ==
Like other TRAPs, SCIMP has negligible extracellular domain and transmembrane domain followed by intracellular domain, containing several tyrosines and one proline-rich region (PRR). Upon phosphorylation, these tyrosines serve as docking domains for SH2 domains containing proteins. In a contrast to phospho-tyrosines, proline rich regions are generally less susceptible to post-translation modifications and they are rather targets of constitutive interactions with SH3 domains containing proteins. It has been shown that SCIMP interacts via SH2 domains with Csk kinase, negative regulator of Src family kinases, but also with Slp65/76 and Grb2 adaptors, which are key pro-signalling soluble adaptor proteins in lymphocyte signalling network. SCIMP is constitutively associated with Lyn kinase via SH3 domain.

== Membrane localization ==
Some of TRAPs are palmitoylated in a border region between transmembrane and intracellular domain. The aliphatic chain of Palmitic acid is anchored to the membrane bilayer and thus influence protein targeting to membrane microdomains. SCIMP is also palmitoylated and is associated with tetraspanin-enriched mircrodomains (TEMs). TEMs, unlike lipid rafts, are based more on protein-protein interactions than lipid-lipid/lipid-protein interactions. One of the resident proteins in TEMs is MHC class II molecule. SCIMP is present in the immunological synapse during antigen presentation between a T cell and an antigen-presenting cell (APC).

== Function ==
This gene encodes a transmembrane adaptor protein that is expressed in antigen-presenting cells and localizes to the immunologic synapse. The encoded protein is involved in major histocompatibility complex class II signal transduction and immune synapse formation. Alternatively spliced transcript variants have been found for this gene. [provided by RefSeq, Dec 2012].

== In vitro studies ==
SCIMP becomes strongly phosphorylated after MHC II stimulation. Studies performed with fusion protein CD25-SCIMP showed its ability to induce calcium release and Erk phosphorylation upon anti-CD25 antibody treatment. The calcium release was even stronger in CD25-SCIMP mutant protein in binding side for Csk. Indicating negative feedback loop performed by Csk kinase. Fusion proteins are commonly used in order to study signalling ability of proteins with a small extracellular domain hidden for antibody in membrane glycocalix. However knock down of SCIMP didn´t influence calcium release after anti MHC II antibody treatment, but only decrease level of Erk phosphorylation in longer time point (10 min.)
