= TM4SF5 =

Protein-coding gene in the species Homo sapiens

Identifiers
- Aliases: TM4SF5, transmembrane 4 L six family member 5
- External IDs: OMIM: 604657; MGI: 1922854; HomoloGene: 2947; GeneCards: TM4SF5; OMA:TM4SF5 - orthologs

Gene location (Human)
Chr.	Chromosome 17 (human)
Band	17p13.2	Start	4,771,884 bp
Band	17p13.2	End	4,783,213 bp

Gene location (Mouse)
Chr.	Chromosome 11 (mouse)
Band	11|11 B3	Start	70,396,070 bp
Band	11|11 B3	End	70,402,004 bp
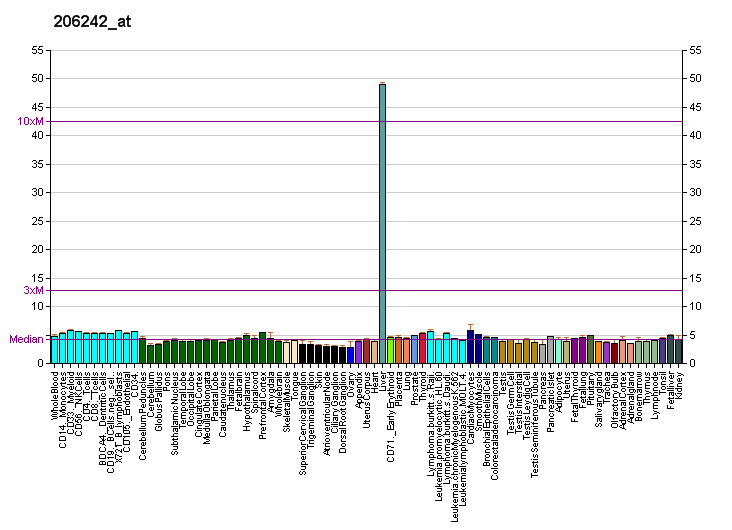
RNA expression pattern
Bgee	Human / Mouse (ortholog); Top expressed in: jejunal mucosa; right lobe of liver; duodenum; mucosa of ileum; mucosa of transverse colon; testicle; gonad; kidney tubule; rectum; human kidney / Top expressed in: duodenum; jejunum; migratory enteric neural crest cell; crypt of lieberkuhn of small intestine; ileum; vestibular membrane of cochlear duct; intestinal epithelium; epithelium of small intestine; mucous cell of stomach; intestinal villus; More reference expression data
BioGPS	More reference expression data
Orthologs
Species	Human	Mouse
Entrez	9032	75604
Ensembl	ENSG00000142484	ENSMUSG00000018919
UniProt	O14894	n/a
RefSeq (mRNA)	NM_003963	NM_029360
RefSeq (protein)	NP_003954	n/a
Location (UCSC)	Chr 17: 4.77 – 4.78 Mb	Chr 11: 70.4 – 70.4 Mb
PubMed search
- Wikidata
View/Edit Human	View/Edit Mouse

Transmembrane 4 L6 family member 5 is a protein that in humans is encoded by the TM4SF5 gene.

The protein encoded by this gene is a member of the transmembrane 4 superfamily, also known as the tetraspanin family. Most of these members are cell-surface proteins that are characterized by the presence of four hydrophobic domains. The proteins mediate signal transduction events that play a role in the regulation of cell development, activation, growth and motility. This encoded protein is a cell surface glycoprotein and is highly similar in sequence and structure to transmembrane 4 superfamily member 1. It may play a role in cell proliferation, and overexpression of this protein may be associated with the uncontrolled growth of tumour cells.
