= SH2D1B =

Protein-coding gene in humans

Identifiers
- Aliases: SH2D1B, EAT2, SH2 domain containing 1B
- External IDs: OMIM: 608510; MGI: 1349420; GeneCards: SH2D1B

Gene location (Human)
Chr.	Chromosome 1 (human)
Band	1q23.3	Start	162,395,268 bp
Band	1q23.3	End	162,412,138 bp

Gene location (Mouse)
Chr.	Chromosome 1 (mouse)
Band	1|1 H3	Start	170,104,889 bp
Band	1|1 H3	End	170,114,338 bp
RNA expression pattern
Bgee	Human / Mouse (ortholog); Top expressed in: granulocyte; gastrocnemius muscle; blood; testicle; sperm; muscle of thigh; monocyte; amniotic fluid; deltoid muscle; spleen / Top expressed in: spleen; granulocyte; lung; jejunum; bone marrow; ileum; choroid plexus; prefrontal cortex; medulla oblongata; superior colliculus; More reference expression data
BioGPS	n/a
Gene ontology
Molecular function	protein-macromolecule adaptor activity; protein binding
Cellular component	cytosol; intracellular anatomical structure
Biological process	innate immune response; leukocyte activation involved in immune response; adaptive immune response; positive regulation of natural killer cell mediated immunity; positive regulation of innate immune response; regulation of immune response; immune system process
Sources:Amigo / QuickGO
Orthologs
Databases	NCBI: entry; OMA: entry
Species	Human	Mouse
Entrez	117157	26904
Ensembl	ENSG00000198574	ENSMUSG00000102418
UniProt	O14796	O35324; Q149T1
RefSeq (mRNA)	NM_053282	NM_012009
RefSeq (protein)	NP_444512	NP_036139
Location (UCSC)	Chr 1: 162.4 – 162.41 Mb	Chr 1: 170.1 – 170.11 Mb
PubMed search
- Wikidata
View/Edit Human	View/Edit Mouse

SH2 domain-containing protein 1B is a protein that in humans is encoded by the SH2D1B gene.

By binding phosphotyrosines through its free SRC (MIM 190090) homology-2 (SH2) domain, EAT2 regulates signal transduction through receptors expressed on the surface of antigen-presenting cells (Morra et al., 2001).[supplied by OMIM]

== Interactions ==
SH2D1B has been shown to interact with SLAMF1.
