= Signalling lymphocyte activation molecule family =

Protein family

The signalling lymphocyte activation molecule family (SLAMF) is a group of cell surface receptors that modulates the activation and differentiation of a wide array of cell types involved in both innate and adaptive immune responses.
