= INPP5D =

Protein-coding gene in the species Homo sapiens

Identifiers
- Aliases: INPP5D, SHIP, SHIP-1, SHIP1, SIP-145, hp51CN, p150Ship, inositol polyphosphate-5-phosphatase D
- External IDs: OMIM: 601582; MGI: 107357; GeneCards: INPP5D
Available structures
PDB	Ortholog search: PDBe RCSB
PDB	List of PDB id codes 2YSX
Enzyme activity
EC #	BRENDA	ExPASy	KEGG	MetaCyc
3.1.3.36	↗	↗	↗	↗
3.1.3.56	↗	↗	↗	↗
3.1.3.86	↗	↗	↗	↗

Gene location (Human)
Chr.	Chromosome 2 (human)
Band	2q37.1	Start	233,059,967 bp
Band	2q37.1	End	233,207,903 bp

Gene location (Mouse)
Chr.	Chromosome 1 (mouse)
Band	1 D|1 44.44 cM	Start	87,548,034 bp
Band	1 D|1 44.44 cM	End	87,648,229 bp
RNA expression pattern
Bgee	Human / Mouse (ortholog); Top expressed in: granulocyte; blood; spleen; lymph node; monocyte; bone marrow; bone marrow cell; appendix; tonsil; sural nerve / Top expressed in: stroma of bone marrow; granulocyte; blood; spleen; mesenteric lymph nodes; thymus; tibiofemoral joint; submandibular gland; fetal liver hematopoietic progenitor cell; blastocyst; More reference expression data
BioGPS	n/a
Gene ontology
Molecular function	SH3 domain binding; inositol-polyphosphate 5-phosphatase activity; PTB domain binding; phosphatidylinositol trisphosphate phosphatase activity; protein binding; hydrolase activity; phosphatidylinositol-3,4,5-trisphosphate 3-phosphatase activity; inositol-1,3,4,5-tetrakisphosphate 5-phosphatase activity; phosphatidylinositol-3,4,5-trisphosphate 5-phosphatase activity
Cellular component	cytoplasm; membrane; plasma membrane; membrane raft; cytoskeleton; cytosol
Biological process	negative regulation of monocyte differentiation; intracellular signal transduction; determination of adult lifespan; positive regulation of erythrocyte differentiation; negative regulation of osteoclast differentiation; negative regulation of granulocyte differentiation; immune system process; positive regulation of B cell differentiation; negative regulation of B cell activation; inositol phosphate metabolic process; negative regulation of neutrophil differentiation; negative regulation of immune response; phosphatidylinositol dephosphorylation; positive regulation of lymphocyte differentiation; immunoglobulin mediated immune response; positive regulation of apoptotic process; phosphate-containing compound metabolic process; phosphatidylinositol biosynthetic process; negative regulation of signal transduction; negative regulation of B cell proliferation; T cell receptor signaling pathway; leukocyte migration; signal transduction; negative regulation of bone resorption; negative regulation of cell population proliferation; apoptotic process; cytokine-mediated signaling pathway
Sources:Amigo / QuickGO
Orthologs
Databases	NCBI: entry; OMA: entry
Species	Human	Mouse
Entrez	3635	16331
Ensembl	ENSG00000168918; ENSG00000281614	ENSMUSG00000026288
UniProt	Q92835	Q9ES52
RefSeq (mRNA)	NM_001017915; NM_005541	NM_001110192; NM_001110193; NM_010566
RefSeq (protein)	NP_001017915; NP_005532	NP_001103662; NP_001103663; NP_034696
Location (UCSC)	Chr 2: 233.06 – 233.21 Mb	Chr 1: 87.55 – 87.65 Mb
PubMed search
- Wikidata
View/Edit Human	View/Edit Mouse

Src homology 2 (SH2) domain containing inositol polyphosphate 5-phosphatase 1 (SHIP1) is an enzyme with phosphatase activity. SHIP1 is structured by multiple domain and is encoded by the INPP5D gene in humans. SHIP1 is expressed predominantly by hematopoietic cells but also, for example, by osteoblasts and endothelial cells. This phosphatase is important for the regulation of cellular activation. Not only catalytic but also adaptor activities of this protein are involved in this process. Its movement from the cytosol to the cytoplasmic membrane, where predominantly performs its function, is mediated by tyrosine phosphorylation of the intracellular chains of cell surface receptors that SHIP1 binds. Insufficient regulation of SHIP1 leads to different pathologies.

== Structure and regulation of activity ==
SHIP1 is a 145 kDa large protein and member of the inositol polyphosphate-5-phosphatase (INPP5) family. Alternate transcriptional splice variants, encoding different isoforms, have been characterized.

At the N-terminus of the protein, SH2 domain is formed. This domain is important for the interaction of SHIP1 with the phosphorylated protein chains that SHIP1 binds. Highly conserved phosphatase domain is in central part of the protein. This catalytic domain is flanked on the N-terminal side by the PH-like domain that binds phosphatidylinositol-3,4,5-triphosphate (PI(3,4,5)P_{3}) and is overlapped on C-terminus with the C2 domain that binds phosphatidylinositol-3,4-bisphosphate (PI(4, 5)P_{2}). The C-tail is not structured, but contains a proline-rich region that forms the motif for binding SH3 domain and also contains sequence containing tyrosine 915 (Y915) and tyrosine 1022 (Y1022) (in human cell) that is typical for interaction with the phosphotyrosine binding domain (PTB domain).

Phosphatase activity of SHIP1 can be allosteric regulated by phosphorylation of the catalytic domain on serine 440 (Ser440), this phosphorylation is mediated by cAMP-dependent protein kinase A (PKA). Second allosteric regulation is mediated by binding PI(3,4)P_{2} to the C2 domain. Furthermore, binding PDB domain to C-terminus of SHIP1 is regulated by Y915 and Y1022 phosphorylation.

== Function ==
At the plasma membrane, the protein hydrolyzes the 5' phosphate from phosphatidylinositol (3,4,5)-trisphosphate and inositol-1,3,4,5-tetrakisphosphate, thereby influence the binding of many proteins to the cytoplasmic membrane thus affecting multiple signaling pathways. To access the substrate which is located on the cytoplasmic membrane, SHIP1 move from cytosol to the plasma membrane. This movement is mediated by binding its SH2 domain to the phosphorylated intracellular chains of cell surface receptors. Binding SHIP1 to phosphorylated immunoreceptor tyrosine-based inhibition motifs (ITIM) of FcγRIIB inhibits the activation of B cells including Ca^{2+} influx. SHIP1 can also interact with other inhibitory receptors and contribute to negative signaling. Overall, the protein functions as a negative regulator of cell proliferation and survival. Nevertheless, SHIP1 may also bind to partially phosphorylated immunoreceptor tyrosine-based activation motifs (ITAM) of some cell surface receptors, for example T cell receptor (TCR) and CD79a/b. SHIP1 does not bind only to intracellular chains of cell surface receptor. Its SH2 domain may also interact with phosphorylated cytoplasmic proteins, such as SHC1 and DOK1.

The regulation of signaling by SHIP1 is not dependent only on its catalytic activity. SHIP1 can also affect cell signaling pathways independently on its catalytic activity by serving as a bridge for other proteins thereby regulate protein-protein interactions.

== Interactions ==
INPP5D has been shown to interact with DOK2, LYN, CD22, Grb2, CRKL, CD31, DOK1 and SHC1.

== Medicines ==
Poor regulation of the SHIP1 function leads to different pathologies. On the one hand, its increased activity is associated with tumorogenesis. On the other hand, its low activity leads to autoinflammatory diseases. This knowledge is used in drug development. In the case of autoinflammatory diseases, there is an attempt to increase SHIP1 catalytic activity by binding the small molecule to the C2 domain. This molecule acts as an allosteric activator. Currently, some molecules are under development and tested as potential anti-inflammatory drug. AQX-1125 (Rosiptor) and AQX-MN100 are both in clinical trials.
