= CD84 =

Protein found in humans

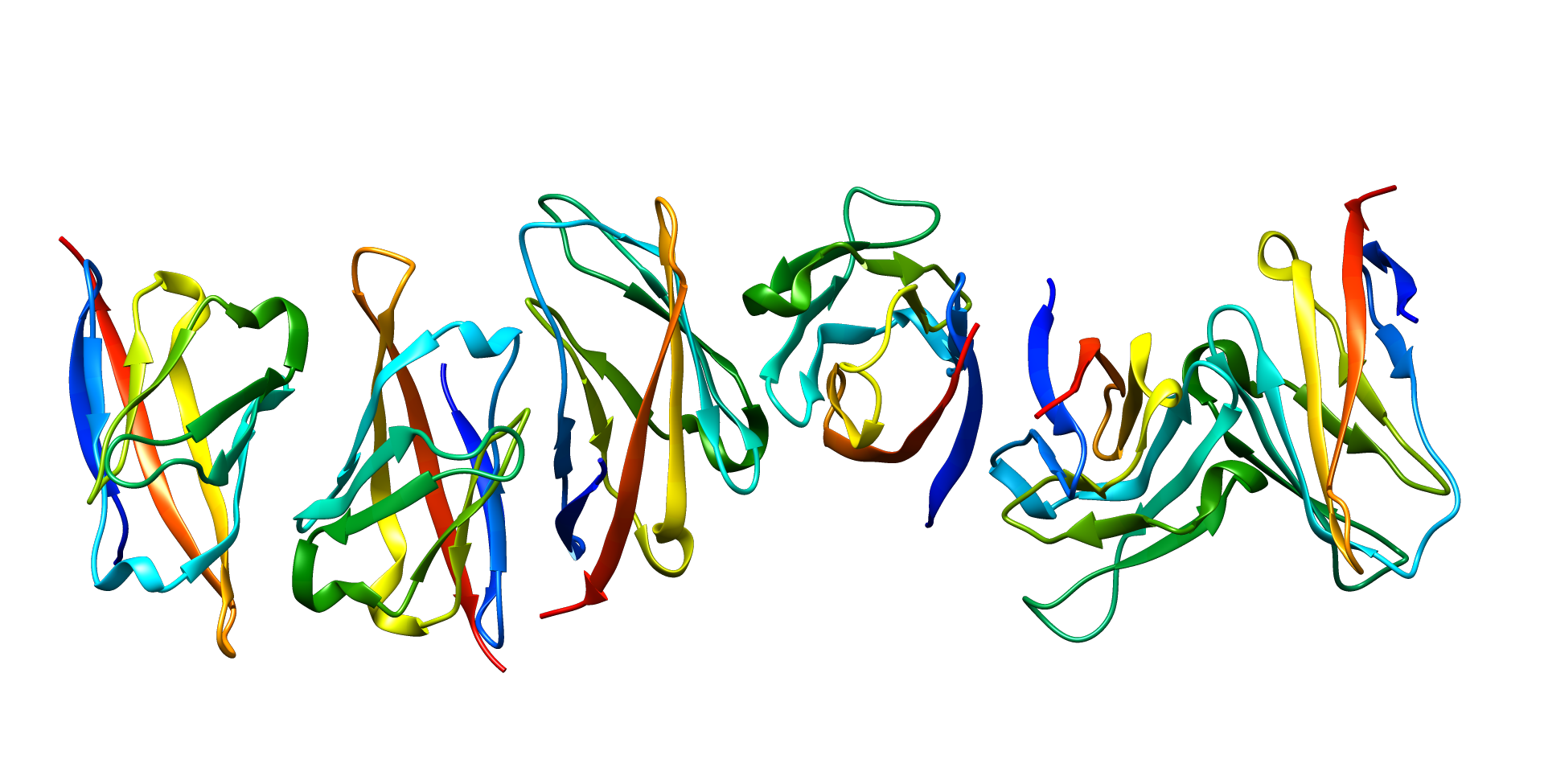

Identifiers
- Aliases: CD84, LY9B, SLAMF5, hmCD84 molecule
- External IDs: OMIM: 604513; MGI: 1336885; GeneCards: CD84
Available structures
PDB	Ortholog search: PDBe RCSB
PDB	List of PDB id codes 2PKD

Gene location (Human)
Chr.	Chromosome 1 (human)
Band	1q23.3	Start	160,541,095 bp
Band	1q23.3	End	160,579,516 bp

Gene location (Mouse)
Chr.	Chromosome 1 (mouse)
Band	1 H3|1 79.54 cM	Start	171,667,265 bp
Band	1 H3|1 79.54 cM	End	171,718,285 bp
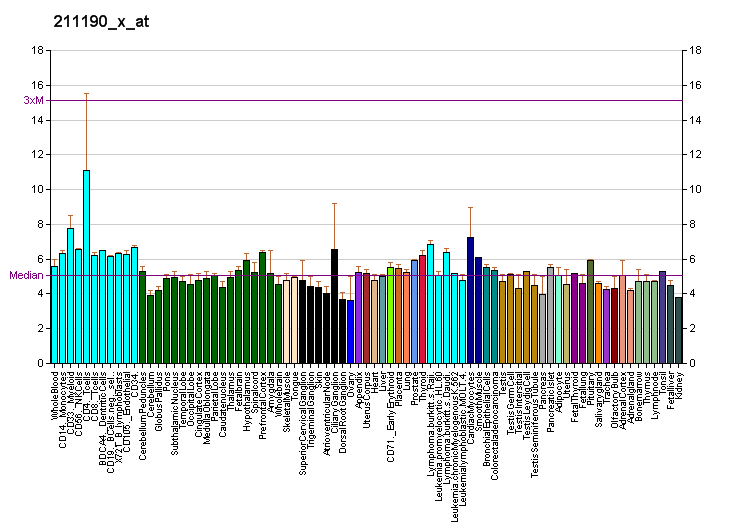

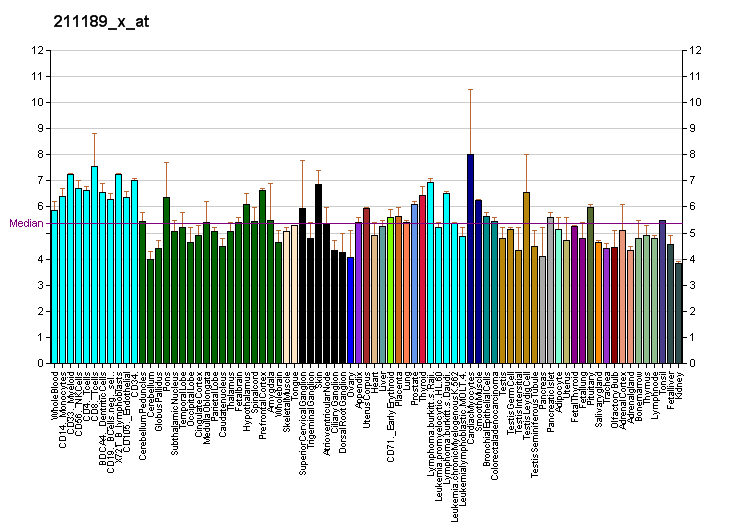

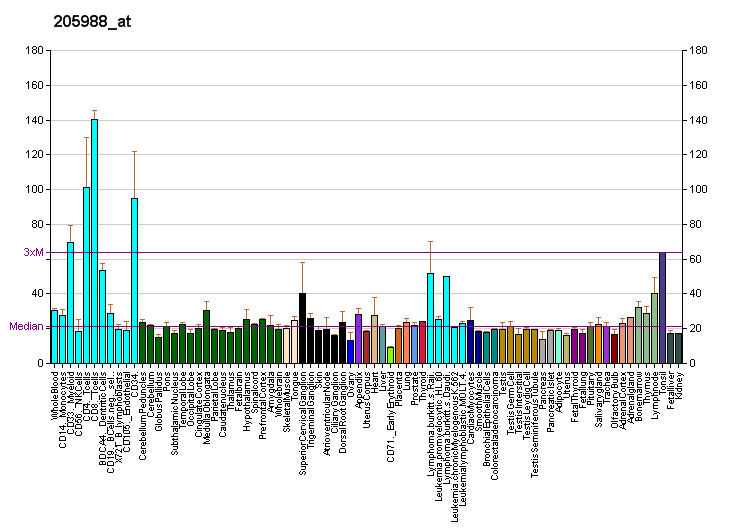
RNA expression pattern
Bgee	Human / Mouse (ortholog); Top expressed in: tibia; lymph node; monocyte; periodontal fiber; appendix; trabecular bone; superficial temporal artery; synovial membrane; visceral pleura; synovial joint / Top expressed in: stroma of bone marrow; granulocyte; blood; calvaria; thymus; tibiofemoral joint; spleen; body of femur; mesenteric lymph nodes; subcutaneous adipose tissue; More reference expression data
BioGPS	More reference expression data
Gene ontology
Molecular function	protein binding; identical protein binding
Cellular component	integral component of membrane; plasma membrane; integral component of plasma membrane; membrane
Biological process	negative regulation of granulocyte macrophage colony-stimulating factor production; defense response; innate immune response; negative regulation of interleukin-18 production; cell adhesion; adaptive immune response; negative regulation of mast cell degranulation; regulation of store-operated calcium entry; negative regulation of mast cell activation; leukocyte migration; homophilic cell adhesion via plasma membrane adhesion molecules; immune system process; autophagy
Sources:Amigo / QuickGO
Orthologs
Databases	NCBI: entry; OMA: entry
Species	Human	Mouse
Entrez	8832	12523
Ensembl	ENSG00000066294	ENSMUSG00000038147
UniProt	Q9UIB8	Q18PI6
RefSeq (mRNA)	NM_001184879; NM_001184881; NM_001184882; NM_003874; NM_001330742	NM_001252472; NM_001289470; NM_013489
RefSeq (protein)	NP_001171808; NP_001171810; NP_001171811; NP_001317671; NP_003865	NP_001239401; NP_001276399; NP_038517
Location (UCSC)	Chr 1: 160.54 – 160.58 Mb	Chr 1: 171.67 – 171.72 Mb
PubMed search
- Wikidata
View/Edit Human	View/Edit Mouse

CD84 (Cluster of Differentiation 84) is a human protein encoded by the CD84 gene.

== Function ==
Members of the CD2 (see MIM 186990) subgroup of the Ig superfamily, such as CD84, have similar patterns of conserved disulfide bonds and function in adhesion interactions between T lymphocytes and accessory cells.

== Interactions ==
CD84 has been shown to interact with SH2D1A.

== See also ==
- Cluster of differentiation
