= LY9 =

Protein-coding gene in humans

Identifiers
- Aliases: LY9, CD229, SLAMF3, hly9, mlymphocyte antigen 9
- External IDs: OMIM: 600684; MGI: 96885; GeneCards: LY9

Gene location (Human)
Chr.	Chromosome 1 (human)
Band	1q23.3	Start	160,796,074 bp
Band	1q23.3	End	160,828,261 bp

Gene location (Mouse)
Chr.	Chromosome 1 (mouse)
Band	1 H3|1 79.54 cM	Start	171,416,192 bp
Band	1 H3|1 79.54 cM	End	171,434,978 bp
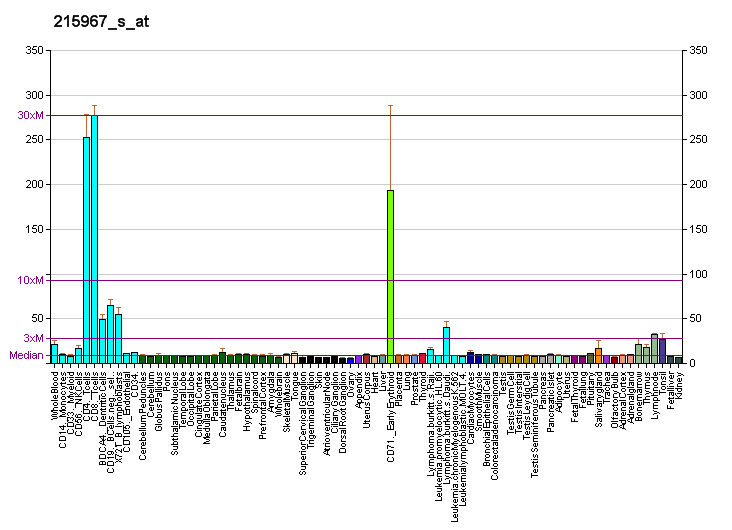

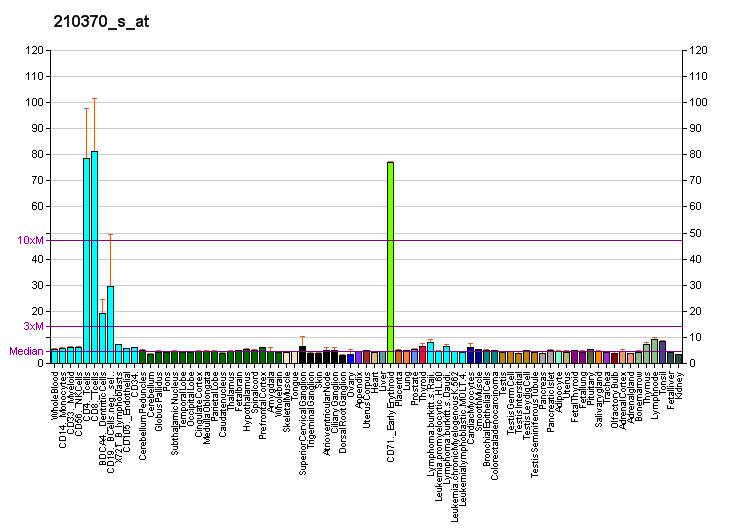
RNA expression pattern
Bgee	Human / Mouse (ortholog); Top expressed in: granulocyte; lymph node; buccal mucosa cell; blood; spleen; bone marrow cell; epithelium of colon; superficial temporal artery; appendix; trabecular bone / Top expressed in: mesenteric lymph nodes; stroma of bone marrow; thymus; spleen; granulocyte; blood; subcutaneous adipose tissue; calvaria; white adipose tissue; right lung lobe; More reference expression data
BioGPS	More reference expression data
Gene ontology
Molecular function	molecular function
Cellular component	integral component of membrane; cell surface; plasma membrane; membrane
Biological process	positive regulation of interleukin-17 production; innate immune response; cell adhesion; adaptive immune response; T-helper 17 cell lineage commitment; immune system process
Sources:Amigo / QuickGO
Orthologs
Databases	NCBI: entry; OMA: entry
Species	Human	Mouse
Entrez	4063	17085
Ensembl	ENSG00000122224	ENSMUSG00000004707
UniProt	Q9HBG7; Q5VYI1	Q01965
RefSeq (mRNA)	NM_001033667; NM_001261456; NM_001261457; NM_002348	NM_001277968; NM_008534
RefSeq (protein)	NP_001028839; NP_001248385; NP_001248386; NP_002339	NP_001264897; NP_032560
Location (UCSC)	Chr 1: 160.8 – 160.83 Mb	Chr 1: 171.42 – 171.43 Mb
PubMed search
- Wikidata
View/Edit Human	View/Edit Mouse

T-lymphocyte surface antigen Ly-9 is a protein that in humans is encoded by the LY9 gene. LY9 has also recently been designated CD229 (cluster of differentiation 229).

== Interactions ==
LY9 has been shown to interact with SH2D1A.
