= SH2D1A =

Protein-coding gene in the species Homo sapiens

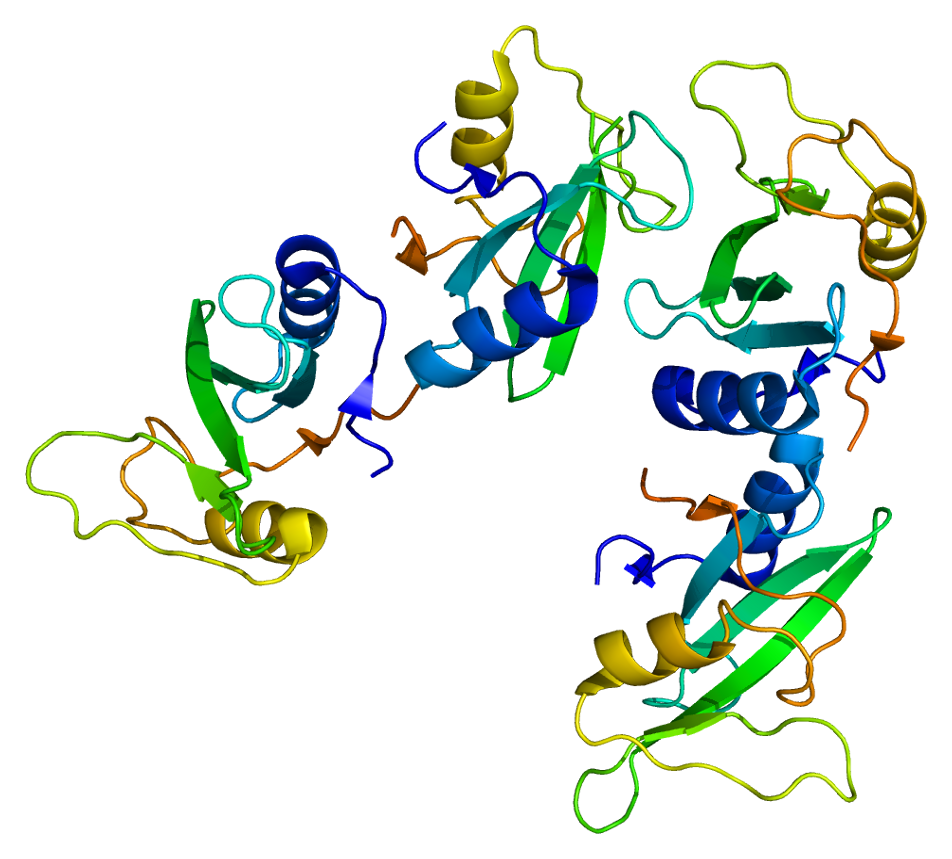

Identifiers
- Aliases: SH2D1A, DSHP, EBVS, IMD5, LYP, MTCP1, SAP, SAP/XLP, XLPD, XLPD1, SH2 domain containing 1A
- External IDs: OMIM: 300490; MGI: 1328352; GeneCards: SH2D1A
Available structures
PDB	Ortholog search: PDBe RCSB
PDB	List of PDB id codes 1D1Z, 1D4T, 1D4W, 1KA6, 1KA7, 1M27

Gene location (Human)
Chr.	X chromosome (human)
Band	Xq25	Start	124,227,868 bp
Band	Xq25	End	124,373,197 bp

Gene location (Mouse)
Chr.	X chromosome (mouse)
Band	X|X A4	Start	41,591,330 bp
Band	X|X A4	End	41,618,207 bp
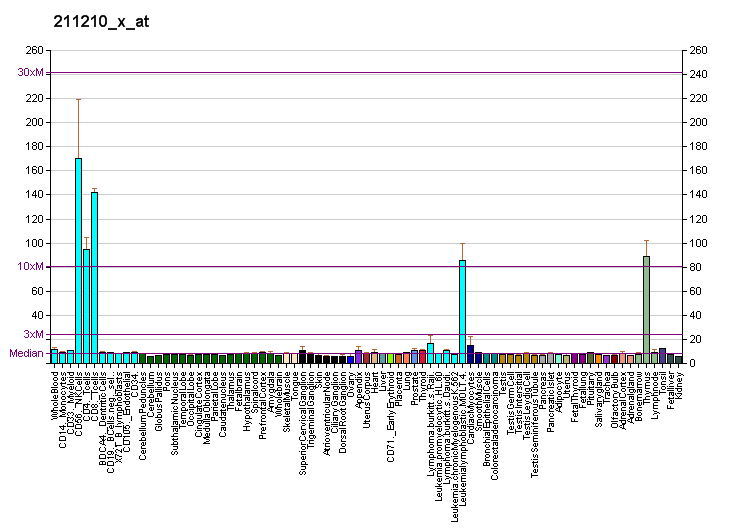

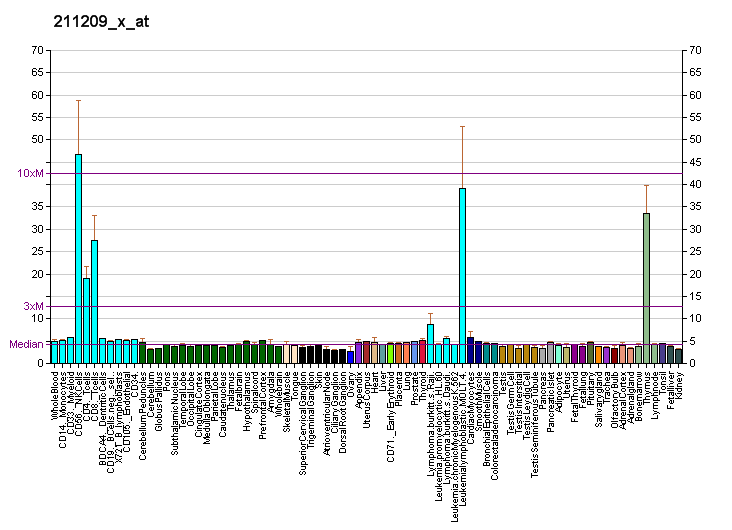

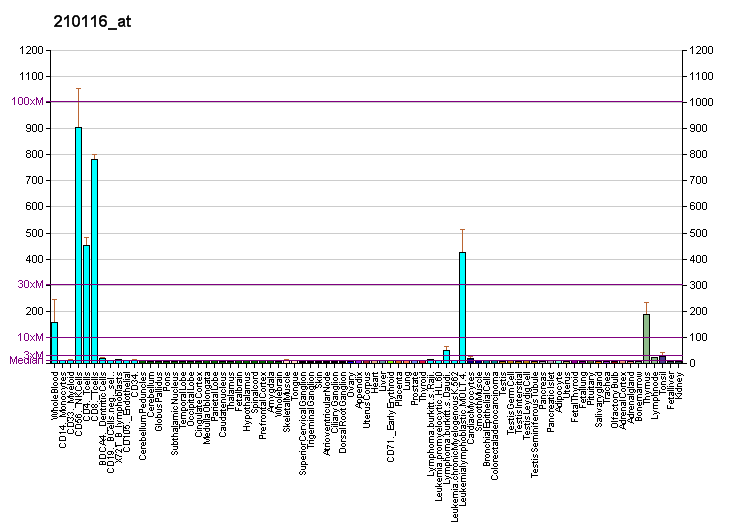
RNA expression pattern
Bgee	Human / Mouse (ortholog); Top expressed in: thymus; lymph node; granulocyte; blood; appendix; spleen; bone marrow; testicle; gallbladder; bone marrow cell / Top expressed in: thymus; blood; neural layer of retina; spermatid; embryo; mesenteric lymph nodes; spleen; embryo; retinal pigment epithelium; granulocyte; More reference expression data
BioGPS	More reference expression data
Gene ontology
Molecular function	protein binding
Cellular component	cytoplasm; cytosol
Biological process	cell-cell signaling; cellular defense response; innate immune response; humoral immune response; positive regulation of natural killer cell mediated cytotoxicity; adaptive immune response; immune system process; regulation of immune response; positive regulation of signal transduction
Sources:Amigo / QuickGO
Orthologs
Databases	NCBI: entry; OMA: entry
Species	Human	Mouse
Entrez	4068	20400
Ensembl	ENSG00000183918	ENSMUSG00000005696
UniProt	O60880	O88890
RefSeq (mRNA)	NM_002351; NM_001114937	NM_011364; NM_001313688; NM_001313689; NM_001313691
RefSeq (protein)	NP_001108409; NP_002342	NP_001300617; NP_001300618; NP_001300620; NP_035494
Location (UCSC)	Chr X: 124.23 – 124.37 Mb	Chr X: 41.59 – 41.62 Mb
PubMed search
- Wikidata
View/Edit Human	View/Edit Mouse

SH2 domain–containing protein 1A is a protein that in humans is encoded by the SH2D1A gene. It is often called SLAM-associated protein (symbol SAP), where "SLAM" refers to signaling lymphocytic activation molecules. It is a SH2 domain–containing molecule (part of a family of such molecules) that plays a role in SLAM signaling. A putative function is as an adaptor for Fyn and competitor of phosphatases, leading to modulation of SLAM family function. SAP has been implicated in autoimmunity, and a mutation of it is associated with X-linked lymphoproliferative disease. At least 32 disease-causing mutations in this gene have been discovered.

== Interactions ==
SH2D1A has been shown to interact with:

- CD84,
- DOK1,
- FYN,
- LY9 and
- SLAMF1.
