= Chromosome 15 =

Human chromosome

- Human chromosome 15 pair after G-banding. One is from the mother, the other from the father

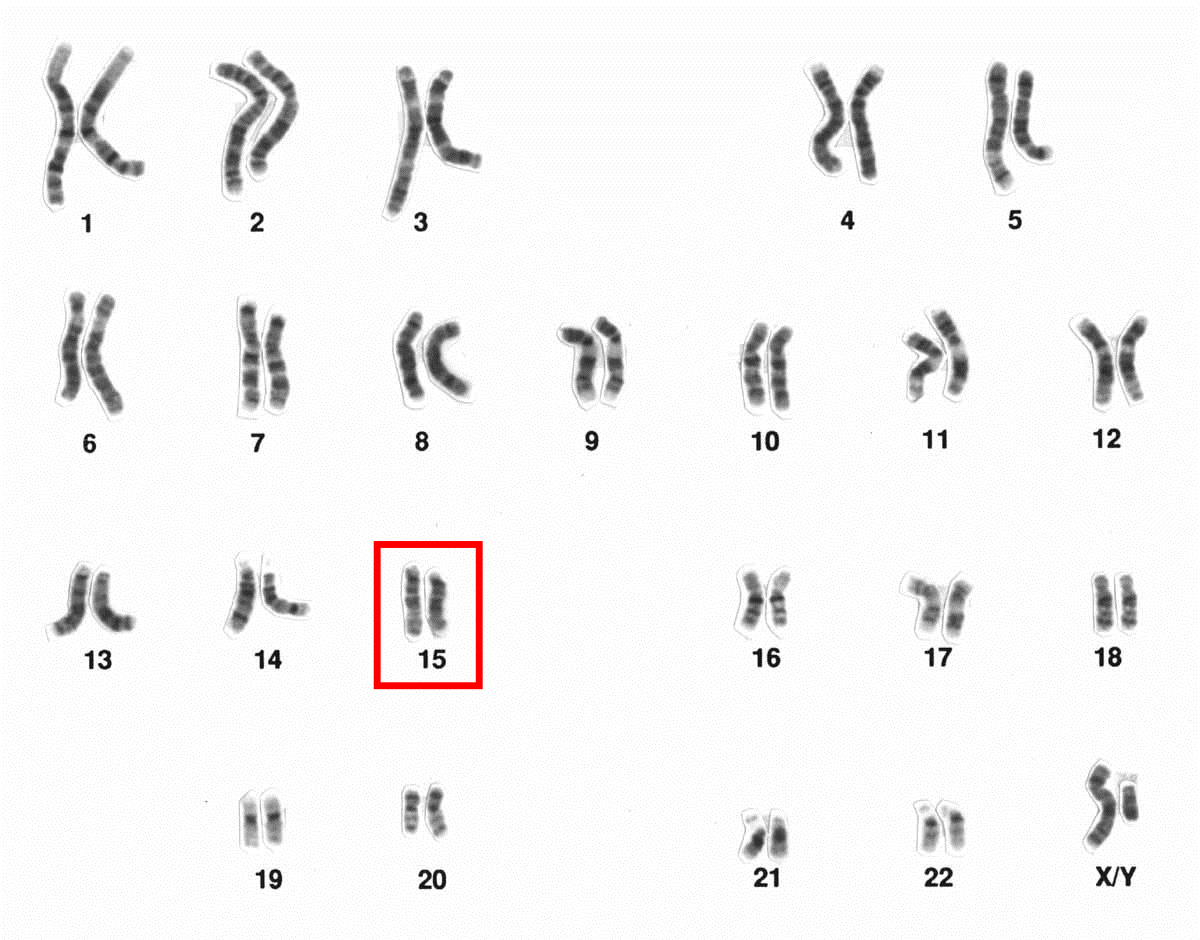
- Chromosome 15 pair in human male karyogram.

Features
- Length (bp): 99,753,195 bp (CHM13)
- No. of genes: 561 (CCDS)
- Type: Autosome
- Centromere position: Acrocentric (19.0 Mbp)

Complete gene lists
- CCDS: Gene list
- HGNC: Gene list
- UniProt: Gene list
- NCBI: Gene list

External map viewers
- Ensembl: Chromosome 15
- Entrez: Chromosome 15
- NCBI: Chromosome 15
- UCSC: Chromosome 15

Full DNA sequences
- RefSeq: NC_000015 (FASTA)
- GenBank: CM000677 (FASTA)

Chromosome 15 is one of the 23 pairs of chromosomes in humans. Like any autosome, humans normally have two copies of this chromosome. Chromosome 15 spans about 99.7 million base pairs (the building material of DNA) and represents between 3% and 3.5% of the total DNA in cells. Chromosome 15 is an acrocentric chromosome, with a very small short arm (the "p" arm, for "petite"), which contains few protein coding genes among its 19 million base pairs. It has a larger long arm (the "q" arm) which is gene-rich, spanning about 83 million base pairs.

The human leukocyte antigen gene for β2-microglobulin is found on chromosome 15, as well as the FBN1 gene, coding for both fibrillin-1 (a protein critical to the proper functioning of connective tissue), and asprosin (a small protein produced from part of the transcribed FBN1 gene mRNA), which is involved in fat metabolism.

== Genes ==
=== Number of genes ===
The following are some of the gene count estimates of human chromosome 15. Because researchers use different approaches to genome annotation their predictions of the number of genes on each chromosome varies (for technical details, see gene prediction). Among various projects, the collaborative consensus coding sequence project (CCDS) takes an extremely conservative strategy. So CCDS's gene number prediction represents a lower bound on the total number of human protein-coding genes.

Estimated by	Protein-coding genes	Non-coding RNA genes	Pseudogenes	Source	Release date
CCDS	561	—	—		2016-09-08
HGNC	559	328	433		2017-05-12
Ensembl	605	992	508		2017-03-29
UniProt	601	—	—		2018-02-28
NCBI	629	716	594		2017-05-19

=== Gene list ===
The following is a partial list of genes on human chromosome 15. For complete list, see the link in the infobox on the right.

- AAGAB: alpha- and gamma-adaptin binding protein
- ACSBG1: encoding enzyme Acyl-CoA Synthetase, Bubblegum Family, member 1
- ADH1: alcohol dehydrogenase
- ARHGAP11B: a human-specific gene encoding the Rho GTPase activating protein 11B, that amplifies basal progenitors, controls neural progenitor proliferation, and contributes to neocortex folding.
- ARPIN: encoding protein Actin related protein 2/3 complex inhibitor
- ARPP-19: encoding protein cAMP-regulated phosphoprotein 19
- B2MR: encoding protein Beta-2-microglobulin regulator
- C15orf32: encoding protein Uncharacterized protein C15orf32
- C15orf54: encoding protein Chromosome 15 Open Reading Frame 54
- CAPN3: Calpain 3 (limb-girdle muscular dystrophy type 2A)
- CELF6: encoding protein Cugbp elav-like family member 6
- CHP: Calcium binding protein P22\
- CHSY1: Chondroitin sulfate synthase 1
- CLK3: CDC like kinase 3
- ClpX: encoding enzyme ATP-dependent Clp protease ATP-binding subunit clpX-like, mitochondrial
- COMMD4: encoding protein COMM domain-containing protein 4
- CPEB1: Cytoplasmic polyladenylation element binding protein 1
- CRAT37: encoding protein Cervical cancer-associated transcript 37
- CYP19A1: encoding protein Cytochrome p450 family 19 subfamily a member 1
- DTWD1:
- ELL3: encoding protein Elongation factor RNA polymerase II-like 3
- FAH: fumarylacetoacetate hydrolase (fumarylacetoacetase)
- FAM214A: encoding protein Protein FAM214A
- FBN1: fibrillin 1 (Marfan syndrome)
- FOXB1: encoding protein Forkhead box B1
- GATM: Glycine aminotransferase, mitochondrial
- GCHFR: GTP cyclohydrolase 1 feedback regulatory protein
- GLC1I: encoding protein Glaucoma 1, open angle, i
- GLCE: D-glucuronyl C5-epimerase
- GOLGA8H: encoding protein Golgin subfamily A member 8H
- HDGFRP3:
- HEXA: hexosaminidase A (alpha polypeptide)(Tay–Sachs disease)
- HMG20A: encoding protein High mobility group protein 20A
- IDDM3 encoding protein Insulin dependent diabetes mellitus 3
- IMP3: encoding protein U3 small nucleolar ribonucleoprotein protein IMP3
- ITPKA: encoding enzyme Inositol-trisphosphate 3-kinase A
- IVD: isovaleryl Coenzyme A dehydrogenase
- KATNBL1: encoding protein KATNBL1
- KIAA1024: encoding protein Kiaa1024
- LARP6 encoding protein La-related protein 6 also known as acheron or La ribonucleoprotein domain family member 6 (LARP6),
- LCMT2: encoding enzyme Leucine carboxyl methyltransferase 2
- LINC00926 encoding protein Long intergenic non-protein coding RNA 926
- MESDC2: encoding protein LDLR chaperone MESD
- MESP1: encoding protein Mesoderm posterior 1 homolog (mouse)
- MFAP1: encoding protein Microfibrillar-associated protein 1
- MCPH4: microcephaly, primary autosomal recessive 4
- MCTP2: encoding protein Multiple c2 domains, transmembrane 2
- MIR7-2: encoding protein MicroRNA 7-2
- MIR1282: encoding protein MicroRNA 1282
- MIR627: encoding protein MicroRNA 627
- MIR9-3HG: encoding protein MIR9-3 host gene
- NIPA2: encoding protein Non-imprinted in Prader-Willi/Angelman syndrome region protein 2
- NUSAP1: encoding protein Nucleolar and spindle associated protein 1
- OCA2: oculocutaneous albinism II (pink-eye dilution homolog, mouse)
- PDCD7: encoding protein Programmed cell death protein 7
- PIF1: encoding protein PIF1 5'-to-3' DNA helicase
- PIGBOS1: encoding protein Pigb opposite strand 1
- PLA2G4D: encoding protein Phospholipase A2 group IVD
- PLA2G4E: encoding protein Phospholipase A2 group IVE
- PML: promyelocytic leukemia protein (involved in t(15,17) with RARalpha, predominant cause of acute promyelocytic leukemia.
- POTEB: encoding protein POTE ankyrin domain family, member B
- PTPLAD1: encoding enzyme Protein tyrosine phosphatase-like protein PTPLAD1
- PYGO1: encoding protein Pygopus homolog 1 (Drosophila)
- RAD51: RAD51 homolog (RecA homolog, E. coli) (S. cerevisiae)
- RMDN3: encoding protein Regulator of microtubule dynamics protein 3
- RNR3: encoding RNA, ribosomal 45S cluster 3
- RSL24D1: encoding protein Probable ribosome biogenesis protein RLP24
- RTF1: encoding protein Rtf1, Paf1/RNA polymerase II complex component, homolog (S. cerevisiae)
- RTFDC1: encoding protein Replication termination factor 2
- SCAMP2: encoding protein Secretory carrier-associated membrane protein 2
- SCAMP5: encoding protein Secretory carrier-associated membrane protein 5
- SCZD10: encoding protein Schizophrenia disorder 10 (periodic catatonia)
- SCAPER: S-phase CyclinA Associated Protein residing in the Endoplasmic Reticulum
- SENP8: encoding enzyme Sentrin-specific protease 8
- SERF2: encoding protein Small EDRK-rich factor 2
- SLC24A5: the gene responsible for at least 1/3 of the skin color differences between races, expressed in the brain and the nervous system
- SNAPC5: encoding protein snRNA-activating protein complex subunit 5
- SPN1: encoding protein Snurportin1
- STRC: stereocilin
- SUHW4: encoding protein Zinc finger protein 280D
- SYNM: encoding protein Synemin
- TEX9: encoding protein Testis-expressed protein 9
- TGFBR2: location 3p24.2-p25 due to a inactivation mutation
- TMC3: encoding protein Transmembrane channel like 3
- TM6SF1: encoding protein Transmembrane 6 superfamily member 1
- TMCO5A: encoding protein Transmembrane and coiled-coil domains 5A
- TMED3: encoding protein Transmembrane p24 trafficking protein 3
- UBE2Q2: encoding protein Ubiquitin conjugating enzyme e2 q2
- UBE3A: ubiquitin protein ligase E3A (human papilloma virus E6-associated protein, Angelman syndrome)
- Ube3a-ATS:
- UNC13C: encoding protein Unc-13 homolog C
- VPS39: encoding protein hVam6p/Vps39-like protein
- WDR76: encoding protein Wd repeat domain 76
- ZNF592: encoding protein Zinc finger protein 592

== Chromosomal conditions ==
The following conditions are caused by mutations in chromosome 15. Two of the conditions (Angelman syndrome and Prader–Willi syndrome) involve a loss of gene activity in the same part of chromosome 15, the 15q11.2-q13.1 region. This discovery provided the first evidence in humans that something beyond genes could determine how the genes are expressed.

=== Angelman syndrome ===
The main characteristics of Angelman syndrome are severe intellectual disability, ataxia, lack of speech, and excessively happy demeanor. Angelman syndrome results from a loss of gene activity in a specific part of chromosome 15, the 15q11-q13 region. This region contains a gene called UBE3A that, when mutated or absent, likely causes the characteristic features of this condition. People normally have two copies of the UBE3A gene, one from each parent. Both copies of this gene are active in many of the body's tissues. In the brain, however, only the copy inherited from a person's mother (the maternal copy) is active. If the maternal copy is lost because of a chromosomal change or a gene mutation, a person will have no working copies of the UBE3A gene in the brain.

In most cases (about 70%), people with Angelman syndrome have a deletion in the maternal copy of chromosome 15. This chromosomal change deletes the region of chromosome 15 that includes the UBE3A gene. Because the copy of the UBE3A gene inherited from a person's father (the paternal copy) is normally inactive in the brain, a deletion in the maternal chromosome 15 results in no active copies of the UBE3A gene in the brain.

In 3% to 7% of cases, Angelman syndrome occurs when a person has two copies of the paternal chromosome 15 instead of one copy from each parent. This phenomenon is called paternal uniparental disomy (UPD). People with paternal UPD for chromosome 15 have two copies of the UBE3A gene, but they are both inherited from the father and are therefore inactive in the brain.

About 10% of Angelman syndrome cases are caused by a mutation in the UBE3A gene, and another 3% result from a defect in the DNA region that controls the activation of the UBE3A gene and other genes on the maternal copy of chromosome 15. In a small percentage of cases, Angelman syndrome may be caused by a chromosomal rearrangement called a translocation or by a mutation in a gene other than UBE3A. These genetic changes can abnormally inactivate the UBE3A gene.

Angelman syndrome can be hereditary, as evidenced by one case where a patient became pregnant with a daughter who also had the condition.

=== Prader–Willi syndrome ===
The main characteristics of this condition include polyphagia (extreme, insatiable appetite), mild to moderate developmental delay, hypogonadism resulting in delayed to no puberty, and hypotonia. Prader-Willi syndrome is caused by the loss of active genes in a specific part of chromosome 15, the 15q11-q13 region. People normally have two copies of this chromosome in each cell, one copy from each parent. Prader–Willi syndrome occurs when the paternal copy is partly or entirely missing.

In about 70% of cases, Prader–Willi syndrome occurs when the 15q11-q13 region of the paternal chromosome 15 is deleted. The genes in this region are normally active on the paternal copy of the chromosome and are inactive on the maternal copy. Therefore, a person with a deletion in the paternal chromosome 15 will have no active genes in this region.

In about 25% of cases, a person with Prader–Willi syndrome has two maternal copies of chromosome 15 in each cell instead of one copy from each parent. This phenomenon is called maternal uniparental disomy. Because some genes are normally active only on the paternal copy of this chromosome, a person with two maternal copies of chromosome 15 will have no active copies of these genes.

In a small percentage of cases, Prader–Willi syndrome is not caused by a chromosomal rearrangement called a translocation. Rarely, the condition is caused by an abnormality in the DNA region that controls the activity of genes on the paternal chromosome 15. Because patients almost always have difficulty reproducing, Prader–Willi syndrome is generally not hereditary.

=== Isodicentric chromosome 15 ===
A specific chromosomal change called an isodicentric chromosome 15 (IDIC15) (also known by a number of other names) can affect growth and development. The patient possesses an "extra" or "marker" chromosome. This small extra chromosome is made up of genetic material from chromosome 15 that has been abnormally duplicated (copied) and attached end-to-end. In some cases, the extra chromosome is very small and has no effect on a person's health. A larger isodicentric chromosome 15 can result in weak muscle tone (hypotonia), intellectual disability, seizures, and behavioral problems. Signs and symptoms of autism (a developmental disorder that affects communication and social interaction) have also been associated with the presence of an isodicentric chromosome 15.

=== Other chromosomal conditions ===
Other changes in the number or structure of chromosome 15 can cause developmental delays, delayed growth and development, hypotonia, and characteristic facial features. These changes include an extra copy of part of chromosome 15 in each cell (partial trisomy 15) or a missing segment of the chromosome in each cell (partial monosomy 15). In some cases, several of the chromosome's DNA building blocks (nucleotides) are deleted or duplicated.

The following diseases are some of those related to genes on chromosome 15:

- Bloom syndrome
- Breast cancer
- Isovaleric acidemia
- Loeys–Dietz, type 3 (SMAD3 gene)
- Marfan syndrome
- Nonsyndromic deafness
- Schaaf–Yang syndrome (SYS)
- Tay–Sachs disease
- Tyrosinemia
- Autosomal Dominant Compelling Helio-Ophthalmic Outburst syndrome

== Cytogenetic band ==
G-banding ideograms of human chromosome 15

G-banding ideogram of human chromosome 15 in resolution 850 bphs. Band length in this diagram is proportional to base-pair length. This type of ideogram is generally used in genome browsers (e.g. Ensembl, UCSC Genome Browser).

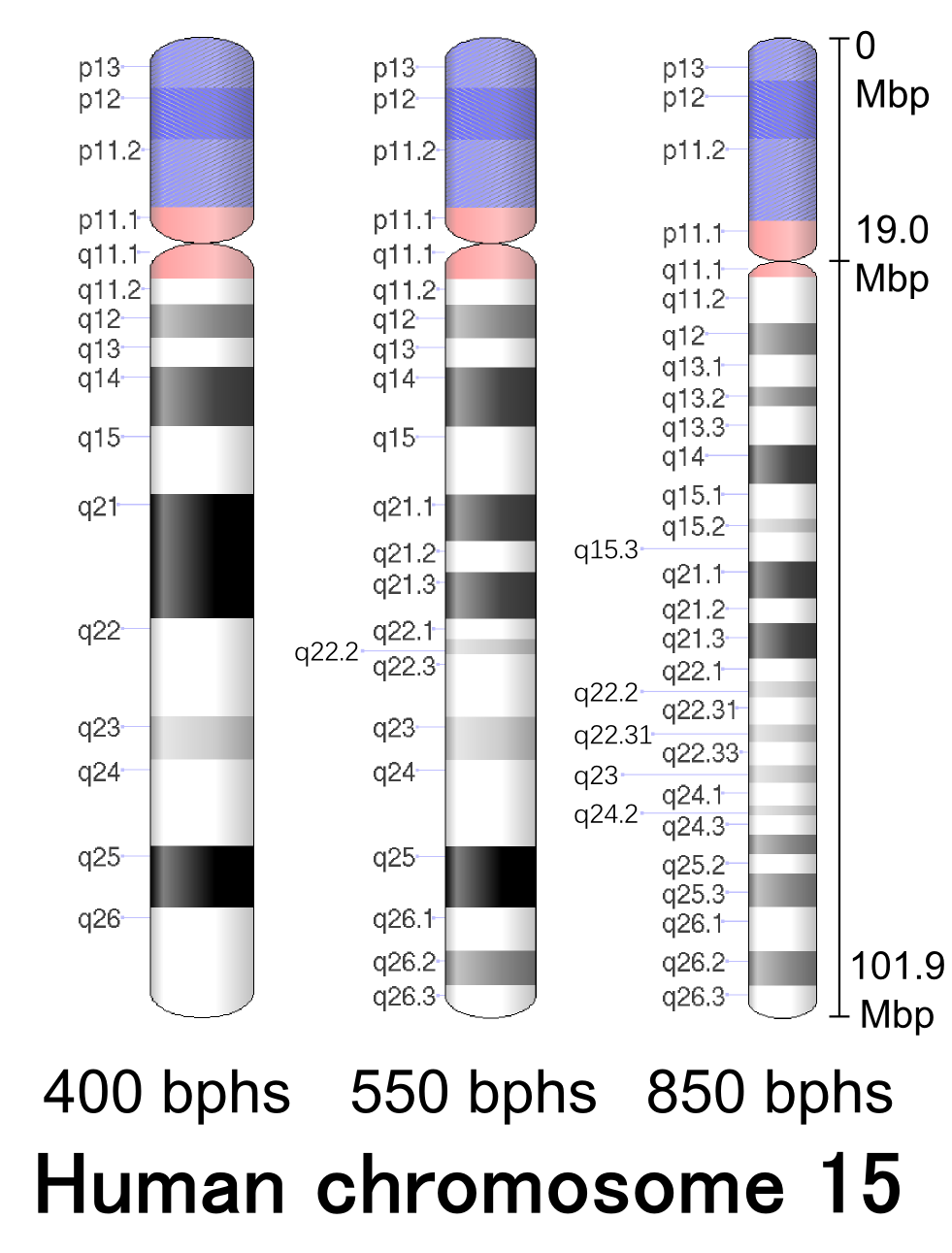
G-banding patterns of human chromosome 15 in three different resolutions (400, 550 and 850). Band length in this diagram is based on the ideograms from ISCN (2013). This type of ideogram represents actual relative band length observed under a microscope at the different moments during the mitotic process.

G-bands of human chromosome 15 in resolution 850 bphs
Chr.	Arm	Band	ISCN start	ISCN stop	Basepair start	Basepair stop	Stain	Density
15	p	13	0	270	1	4,200,000	gvar	
15	p	12	270	631	4,200,001	9,700,000	stalk	
15	p	11.2	631	1142	9,700,001	17,500,000	gvar	
15	p	11.1	1142	1382	17,500,001	19,000,000	acen	
15	q	11.1	1382	1487	19,000,001	20,500,000	acen	
15	q	11.2	1487	1773	20,500,001	25,500,000	gneg	
15	q	12	1773	1968	25,500,001	27,800,000	gpos	50
15	q	13.1	1968	2164	27,800,001	30,000,000	gneg	
15	q	13.2	2164	2284	30,000,001	30,900,000	gpos	50
15	q	13.3	2284	2524	30,900,001	33,400,000	gneg	
15	q	14	2524	2765	33,400,001	39,800,000	gpos	75
15	q	15.1	2765	2975	39,800,001	42,500,000	gneg	
15	q	15.2	2975	3065	42,500,001	43,300,000	gpos	25
15	q	15.3	3065	3245	43,300,001	44,500,000	gneg	
15	q	21.1	3245	3471	44,500,001	49,200,000	gpos	75
15	q	21.2	3471	3621	49,200,001	52,600,000	gneg	
15	q	21.3	3621	3846	52,600,001	58,800,000	gpos	75
15	q	22.1	3846	3982	58,800,001	59,000,000	gneg	
15	q	22.2	3982	4087	59,000,001	63,400,000	gpos	25
15	q	22.31	4087	4252	63,400,001	66,900,000	gneg	
15	q	22.32	4252	4357	66,900,001	67,000,000	gpos	25
15	q	22.33	4357	4507	67,000,001	67,200,000	gneg	
15	q	23	4507	4613	67,200,001	72,400,000	gpos	25
15	q	24.1	4613	4748	72,400,001	74,900,000	gneg	
15	q	24.2	4748	4808	74,900,001	76,300,000	gpos	25
15	q	24.3	4808	4928	76,300,001	78,000,000	gneg	
15	q	25.1	4928	5048	78,000,001	81,400,000	gpos	50
15	q	25.2	5048	5169	81,400,001	84,700,000	gneg	
15	q	25.3	5169	5379	84,700,001	88,500,000	gpos	50
15	q	26.1	5379	5649	88,500,001	93,800,000	gneg	
15	q	26.2	5649	5860	93,800,001	98,000,000	gpos	50
15	q	26.3	5860	6070	98,000,001	101,991,189	gneg	
