= HDGFL3 =

Protein-coding gene in humans

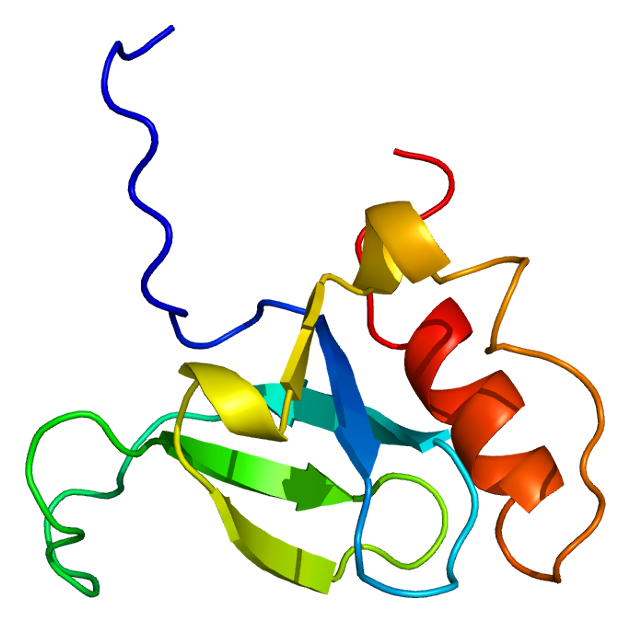

Identifiers
- Aliases: HDGFL3, CGI-142, HDGF-2, HDGF2, HRP-3, HDGFRP3, hepatoma-derived growth factor, related protein 3, HDGF like 3
- External IDs: OMIM: 616643; MGI: 1352760; GeneCards: HDGFL3
Available structures
PDB	Ortholog search: PDBe RCSB
PDB	List of PDB id codes 1N27

Gene location (Human)
Chr.	Chromosome 15 (human)
Band	15q25.2	Start	83,112,738 bp
Band	15q25.2	End	83,207,823 bp

Gene location (Mouse)
Chr.	Chromosome 7 (mouse)
Band	7|7 D3	Start	81,530,999 bp
Band	7|7 D3	End	81,584,221 bp
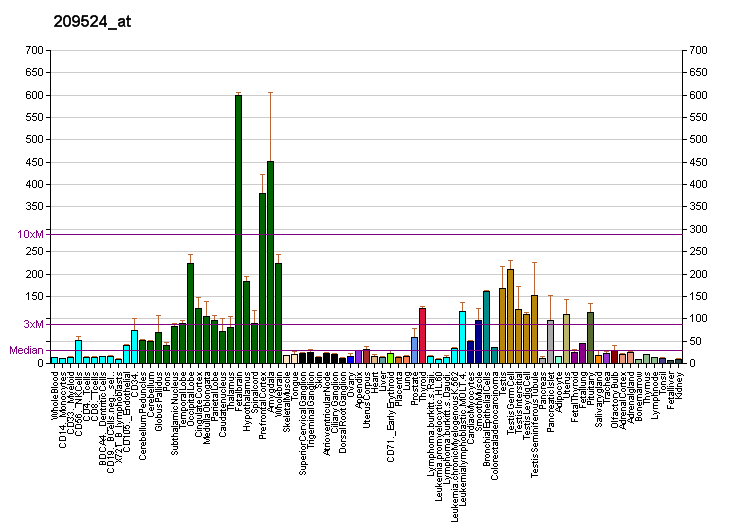

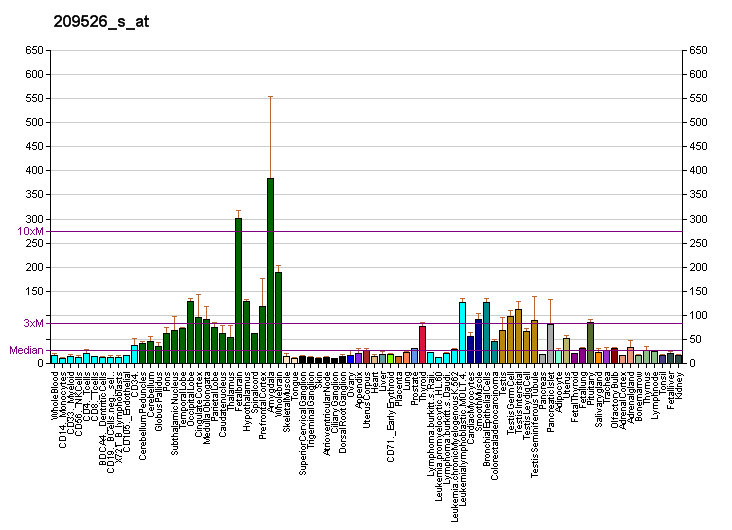

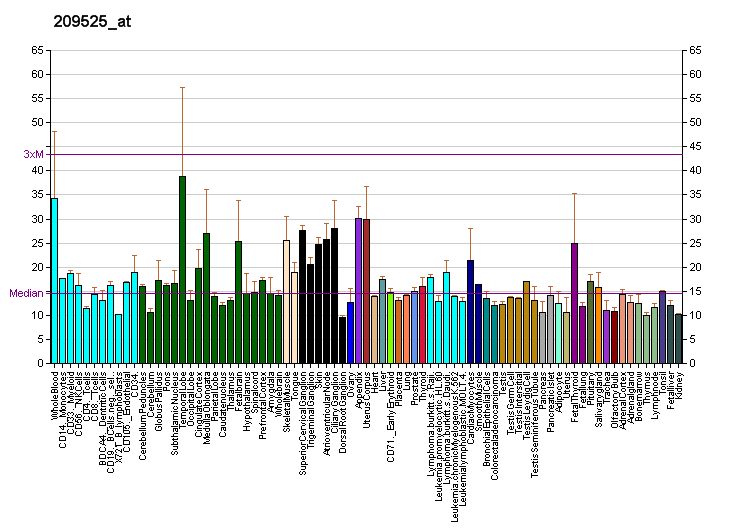
RNA expression pattern
Bgee	Human / Mouse (ortholog); Top expressed in: ganglionic eminence; Achilles tendon; ventricular zone; Brodmann area 23; entorhinal cortex; postcentral gyrus; orbitofrontal cortex; corpus epididymis; Region I of hippocampus proper; endothelial cell / Top expressed in: Rostral migratory stream; barrel cortex; ganglionic eminence; medial ganglionic eminence; mandibular prominence; maxillary prominence; ventromedial nucleus; lateral septal nucleus; human fetus; paraventricular nucleus of hypothalamus; More reference expression data
BioGPS	More reference expression data
Gene ontology
Molecular function	microtubule binding; tubulin binding; growth factor activity
Cellular component	cytoplasm; cytosol; nucleus; nucleoplasm; extracellular region
Biological process	negative regulation of microtubule depolymerization; microtubule polymerization; cell population proliferation; neuron projection development; regulation of signaling receptor activity; signal transduction
Sources:Amigo / QuickGO
Orthologs
Databases	NCBI: entry; OMA: entry
Species	Human	Mouse
Entrez	50810	29877
Ensembl	ENSG00000166503	ENSMUSG00000025104
UniProt	Q9Y3E1	Q9JMG7
RefSeq (mRNA)	NM_016073	NM_013886
RefSeq (protein)	NP_057157	NP_038914
Location (UCSC)	Chr 15: 83.11 – 83.21 Mb	Chr 7: 81.53 – 81.58 Mb
PubMed search
- Wikidata
View/Edit Human	View/Edit Mouse

Hepatoma-derived growth factor-related protein 3 is a protein that in humans is encoded by the gene HDGFL3 (previously HDGFRP3).
