= MicroRNA 7-2 =

MIR7-2

Identifiers
- Aliases: MIR7-2, MIRN7-2, hsa-mir-7-2, mir-7-2, microRNA 7-2
- External IDs: GeneCards: MIR7-2; OMA:MIR7-2 - orthologs

Gene location (Human)
Chr.	Chromosome 15 (human)
Band	15q26.1	Start	88,611,825 bp
Band	15q26.1	End	88,611,934 bp
RNA expression pattern
Bgee	Human / Mouse (ortholog); Top expressed in: monocyte; blood; tibial arteries; hippocampus proper; mucosa of esophagus; right ovary; lung; spleen; thyroid gland; left lobe of thyroid gland / n/a; More reference expression data
BioGPS	n/a
Orthologs
Species	Human	Mouse
Entrez	407044	n/a
Ensembl	ENSG00000207703	n/a
UniProt	n a	n/a
RefSeq (mRNA)	n/a	n/a
RefSeq (protein)	n/a	n/a
Location (UCSC)	Chr 15: 88.61 – 88.61 Mb	n/a
PubMed search		n/a
- Wikidata
View/Edit Human

MicroRNA 7-2 is a non-protein-coding gene product that in humans is encoded by the MIR7-2 gene.

== Function ==
microRNAs (miRNAs) are short (20-24 nt) non-coding RNAs that are involved in post-transcriptional regulation of gene expression in multicellular organisms by affecting both the stability and translation of mRNAs. miRNAs are transcribed by RNA polymerase II as part of capped and polyadenylated primary transcripts (pri-miRNAs) that can be either protein-coding or non-coding. The primary transcript is cleaved by the Drosha ribonuclease III enzyme to produce an approximately 70-nt stem-loop precursor miRNA (pre-miRNA), which is further cleaved by the cytoplasmic Dicer ribonuclease to generate the mature miRNA and antisense miRNA star (miRNA*) products. The mature miRNA is incorporated into a RNA-induced silencing complex (RISC), which recognizes target mRNAs through imperfect base pairing with the miRNA and most commonly results in translational inhibition or destabilization of the target mRNA. The RefSeq represents the predicted microRNA stem-loop.
