= Zinc finger protein 592 =

Protein found in humans

ZNF592

Identifiers
- Aliases: ZNF592, CAMOS, SCAR5, zinc finger protein 592
- External IDs: OMIM: 613624; MGI: 2443541; GeneCards: ZNF592

Gene location (Human)
Chr.	Chromosome 15 (human)
Band	15q25.3	Start	84,748,592 bp
Band	15q25.3	End	84,806,445 bp

Gene location (Mouse)
Chr.	Chromosome 7 (mouse)
Band	7|7 D3	Start	80,643,429 bp
Band	7|7 D3	End	80,694,912 bp
RNA expression pattern
Bgee	Human / Mouse (ortholog); Top expressed in: pancreatic ductal cell; tibialis anterior muscle; mucosa of ileum; gastrocnemius muscle; muscle of thigh; bone marrow cell; granulocyte; blood; sural nerve; deltoid muscle / Top expressed in: zygote; secondary oocyte; primary oocyte; otic vesicle; granulocyte; otolith organ; utricle; tail of embryo; mesenteric lymph nodes; ciliary body; More reference expression data
BioGPS	n/a
Gene ontology
Molecular function	DNA binding; protein binding; metal ion binding; nucleic acid binding; DNA-binding transcription factor activity, RNA polymerase II-specific
Cellular component	nucleus
Biological process	regulation of transcription, DNA-templated; transcription, DNA-templated; regulation of transcription by RNA polymerase II
Sources:Amigo / QuickGO
Orthologs
Databases	NCBI: entry; OMA: entry
Species	Human	Mouse
Entrez	9640	233410
Ensembl	ENSG00000166716	ENSMUSG00000005621
UniProt	Q92610	Q8BHZ4
RefSeq (mRNA)	NM_014630	NM_178707
RefSeq (protein)	NP_055445	NP_848822
Location (UCSC)	Chr 15: 84.75 – 84.81 Mb	Chr 7: 80.64 – 80.69 Mb
PubMed search
- Wikidata
View/Edit Human	View/Edit Mouse

Zinc finger protein 592 is a protein that in humans is encoded by the ZNF592 gene.

== Function ==
This gene is thought to play a role in a complex developmental pathway and the regulation of genes involved in cerebellar development. Mutations in this gene have been associated with autosomal recessive spinocerebellar ataxia.
