= IMP3 =

Protein-coding gene in the species Homo sapiens

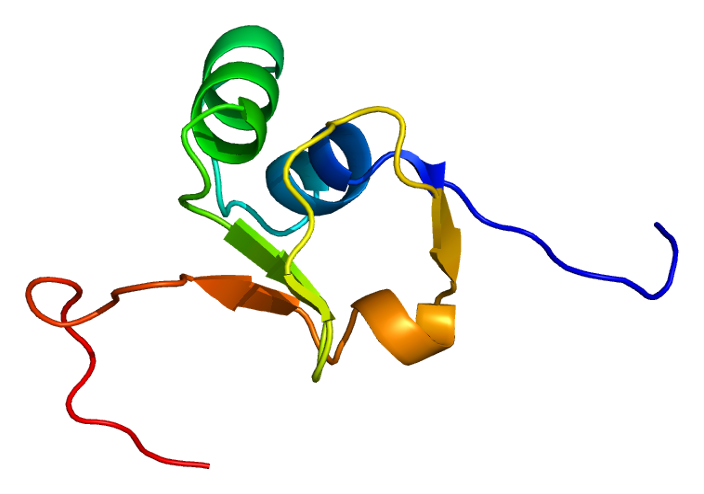

Identifiers
- Aliases: IMP3, BRMS2, C15orf12, MRPS4, U3 small nucleolar ribonucleoprotein, IMP U3 small nucleolar ribonucleoprotein 3
- External IDs: OMIM: 612980; MGI: 1916119; GeneCards: IMP3
Available structures
PDB	Ortholog search: PDBe RCSB
PDB	List of PDB id codes 2CQJ

Gene location (Human)
Chr.	Chromosome 15 (human)
Band	15q24.2	Start	75,639,085 bp
Band	15q24.2	End	75,648,706 bp

Gene location (Mouse)
Chr.	Chromosome 9 (mouse)
Band	9|9 B	Start	56,844,759 bp
Band	9|9 B	End	56,845,682 bp
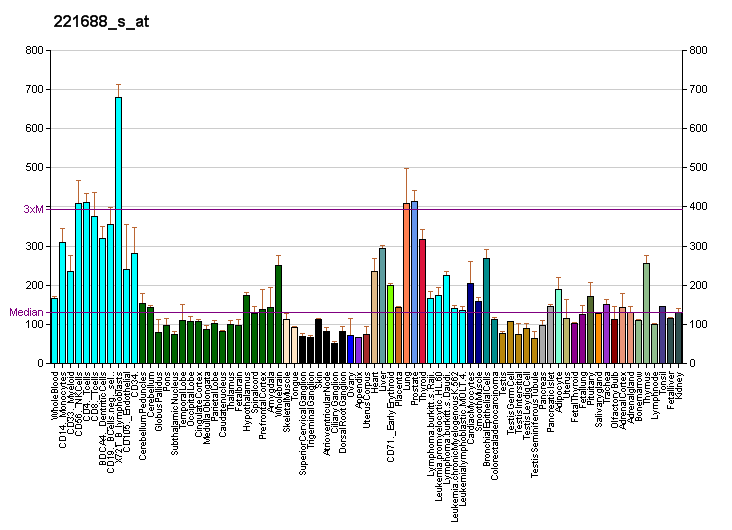
RNA expression pattern
Bgee	Human / Mouse (ortholog); Top expressed in: mucosa of transverse colon; granulocyte; skin of abdomen; right lobe of liver; right adrenal gland; right adrenal cortex; left adrenal gland; mucosa of esophagus; left adrenal cortex; skin of leg / Top expressed in: embryo; embryo; medial ganglionic eminence; lactiferous gland; choroid plexus of fourth ventricle; condyle; fossa; lip; epiblast; endocardial cushion; More reference expression data
BioGPS	More reference expression data
Gene ontology
Molecular function	structural constituent of ribosome; rRNA binding; protein binding; snoRNA binding; RNA binding
Cellular component	small ribosomal subunit; small-subunit processome; Mpp10 complex; nucleolus; intracellular anatomical structure; nucleus; nucleoplasm; preribosome
Biological process	positive regulation of translational fidelity; ribosome biogenesis; rRNA processing
Sources:Amigo / QuickGO
Orthologs
Databases	NCBI: entry; OMA: entry
Species	Human	Mouse
Entrez	55272	102462
Ensembl	ENSG00000177971	ENSMUSG00000032288
UniProt	Q9NV31	Q921Y2
RefSeq (mRNA)	NM_018285	NM_133976
RefSeq (protein)	NP_060755	NP_598737
Location (UCSC)	Chr 15: 75.64 – 75.65 Mb	Chr 9: 56.84 – 56.85 Mb
PubMed search
- Wikidata
View/Edit Human	View/Edit Mouse

U3 small nucleolar ribonucleoprotein protein IMP3 is a protein that in humans is encoded by the IMP3 gene.

== Function ==
This gene encodes the human homolog of the yeast Imp3 protein. The protein localizes to the nucleoli and interacts with the U3 snoRNP complex. The protein contains an S4 domain.

== Sources ==
- http://www.imp3.org/
