= VPS39 =

Protein-coding gene in the species Homo sapiens

Identifiers
- Aliases: VPS39, TLP, VAM6, hVam6p, HOPS complex subunit, VPS39 subunit of HOPS complex
- External IDs: OMIM: 612188; MGI: 2443189; GeneCards: VPS39

Gene location (Human)
Chr.	Chromosome 15 (human)
Band	15q15.1	Start	42,158,701 bp
Band	15q15.1	End	42,208,307 bp

Gene location (Mouse)
Chr.	Chromosome 2 (mouse)
Band	2|2 E5	Start	120,146,942 bp
Band	2|2 E5	End	120,183,618 bp
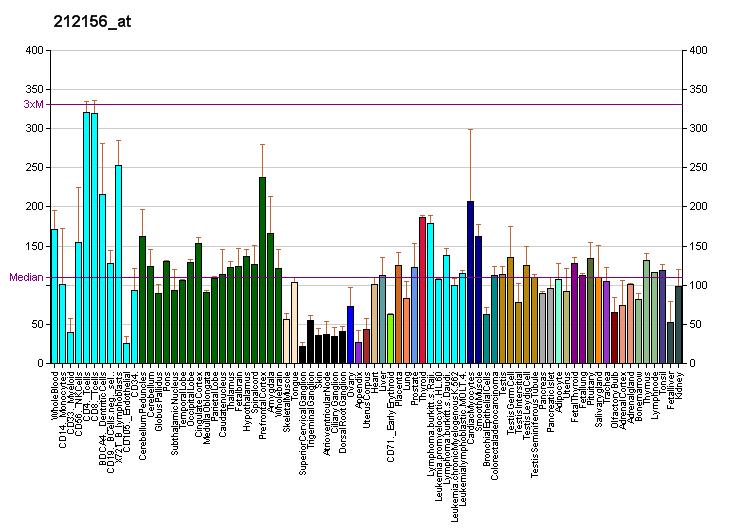
RNA expression pattern
Bgee	Human / Mouse (ortholog); Top expressed in: right uterine tube; granulocyte; gastric mucosa; skin of leg; right lobe of thyroid gland; skin of abdomen; left lobe of thyroid gland; anterior pituitary; apex of heart; right adrenal cortex / Top expressed in: zygote; secondary oocyte; primary visual cortex; genital tubercle; neural layer of retina; facial motor nucleus; superior frontal gyrus; cerebellar cortex; motor neuron; supraoptic nucleus; More reference expression data
BioGPS	More reference expression data
Orthologs
Databases	NCBI: entry; OMA: entry
Species	Human	Mouse
Entrez	23339	269338
Ensembl	ENSG00000166887	ENSMUSG00000027291
UniProt	Q96JC1	Q8R5L3
RefSeq (mRNA)	NM_001301138; NM_015289	NM_147153; NM_178851; NM_001363053; NM_001363054
RefSeq (protein)	NP_001288067; NP_056104	NP_671495; NP_849182; NP_001349982; NP_001349983
Location (UCSC)	Chr 15: 42.16 – 42.21 Mb	Chr 2: 120.15 – 120.18 Mb
PubMed search
- Wikidata
View/Edit Human	View/Edit Mouse

hVamp6/Vps39-like protein is a protein that in humans is encoded by the VPS39 gene.

This gene encodes a protein that may promote clustering and fusion of late endosomes and lysosomes. The protein may also act as an adaptor protein that modulates the transforming growth factor-beta response by coupling the transforming growth factor-beta receptor complex to the Smad pathway.
