= PDCD7 =

Protein-coding gene in the species Homo sapiens

Identifiers
- Aliases: PDCD7, ES18, HES18, programmed cell death 7, 59K
- External IDs: OMIM: 608138; MGI: 1859170; GeneCards: PDCD7

Gene location (Human)
Chr.	Chromosome 15 (human)
Band	15q22.31	Start	65,117,379 bp
Band	15q22.31	End	65,133,808 bp

Gene location (Mouse)
Chr.	Chromosome 9 (mouse)
Band	9|9 C	Start	65,253,386 bp
Band	9|9 C	End	65,266,925 bp
RNA expression pattern
Bgee	Human / Mouse (ortholog); Top expressed in: secondary oocyte; buccal mucosa cell; nipple; superior surface of tongue; tendon of biceps brachii; thymus; external globus pallidus; nasal epithelium; tail of epididymis; medulla oblongata / Top expressed in: primary oocyte; secondary oocyte; zygote; spermatocyte; neural layer of retina; muscle of thigh; epiblast; soleus muscle; genital tubercle; corneal stroma; More reference expression data
BioGPS	n/a
Orthologs
Databases	NCBI: entry; OMA: entry
Species	Human	Mouse
Entrez	10081	50996
Ensembl	ENSG00000090470	ENSMUSG00000041837
UniProt	Q8N8D1	Q9WTY1
RefSeq (mRNA)	NM_005707	NM_016688
RefSeq (protein)	NP_005698	n/a
Location (UCSC)	Chr 15: 65.12 – 65.13 Mb	Chr 9: 65.25 – 65.27 Mb
PubMed search
- Wikidata
View/Edit Human	View/Edit Mouse

Programmed cell death protein 7 is a protein that in humans is encoded by the PDCD7 gene.

This gene encodes a protein with sequence similarity to a mouse protein originally identified in embryonic stem cells. In mouse T-cell lines, this protein appears to be related to glucocorticoid- and staurine-induced apoptotic pathways, and to be linked to ceramide-mediated signalling. These observations suggest that this gene product is involved in specific apoptotic processes in T-cells.
