= GCHFR =

Protein-coding gene in the species Homo sapiens

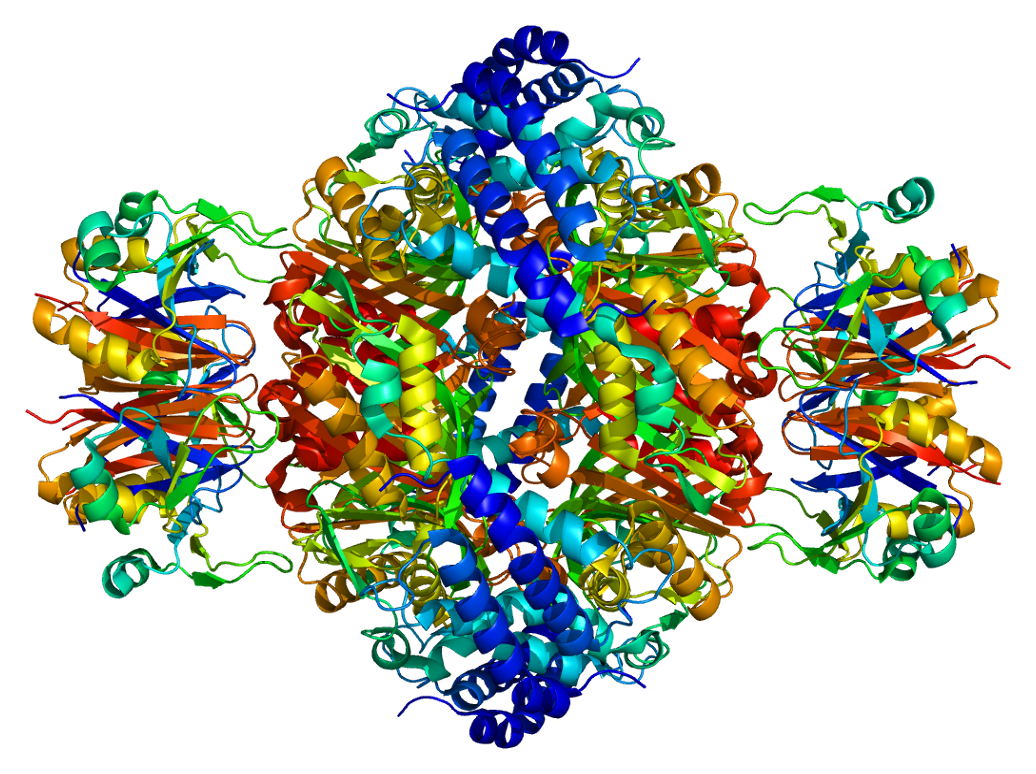

Identifiers
- Aliases: GCHFR, GFRP, HsT16933, P35, GTP cyclohydrolase I feedback regulator
- External IDs: OMIM: 602437; MGI: 2443977; HomoloGene: 3849; GeneCards: GCHFR; OMA:GCHFR - orthologs

Gene location (Human)
Chr.	Chromosome 15 (human)
Band	15q15.1	Start	40,764,068 bp
Band	15q15.1	End	40,767,708 bp

Gene location (Mouse)
Chr.	Chromosome 2 (mouse)
Band	2|2 E5	Start	118,998,254 bp
Band	2|2 E5	End	119,002,871 bp
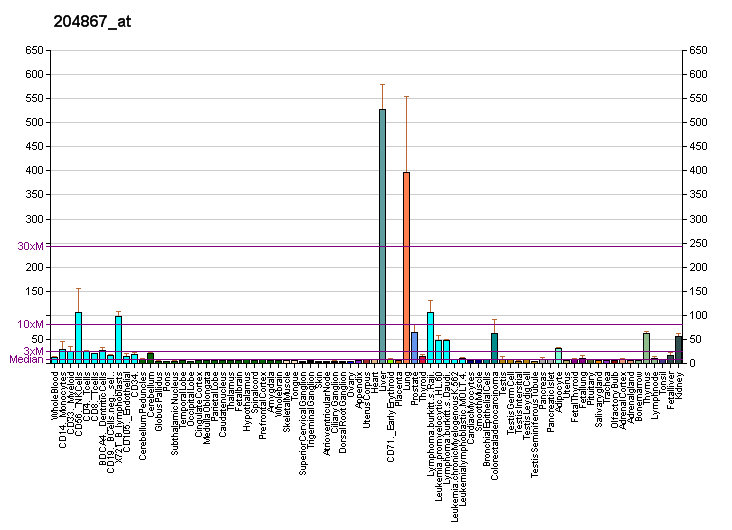
RNA expression pattern
Bgee	Human / Mouse (ortholog); Top expressed in: right lobe of liver; olfactory zone of nasal mucosa; mucosa of transverse colon; right lung; jejunal mucosa; mucosa of ileum; duodenum; human kidney; upper lobe of left lung; oral cavity / Top expressed in: right kidney; left lobe of liver; proximal tubule; olfactory epithelium; jejunum; interventricular septum; embryo; blood; lobe of prostate; human kidney; More reference expression data
BioGPS	More reference expression data
Gene ontology
Molecular function	GTP cyclohydrolase binding; enzyme inhibitor activity; amino acid binding; protein binding; enzyme binding; GTP-dependent protein binding
Cellular component	cytoplasm; cytosol; nuclear membrane; membrane; melanosome; dendrite; nucleus; nucleoplasm; protein-containing complex
Biological process	nitric oxide biosynthetic process; protein heterooligomerization; negative regulation of GTP cyclohydrolase I activity; neurotransmitter metabolic process; negative regulation of biosynthetic process; protein-containing complex assembly
Sources:Amigo / QuickGO
Orthologs
Species	Human	Mouse
Entrez	2644	320415
Ensembl	ENSG00000137880	ENSMUSG00000046814
UniProt	P30047	P99025
RefSeq (mRNA)	NM_005258	NM_177157
RefSeq (protein)	NP_005249	NP_796131
Location (UCSC)	Chr 15: 40.76 – 40.77 Mb	Chr 2: 119 – 119 Mb
PubMed search
- Wikidata
View/Edit Human	View/Edit Mouse

GTP cyclohydrolase 1 feedback regulatory protein is an enzyme that in humans is encoded by the GCHFR gene.

GTP cyclohydrolase I feedback regulatory protein binds to and mediates tetrahydrobiopterin inhibition of GTP cyclohydrolase I. The regulatory protein, GCHFR, consists of a homodimer. It is postulated that GCHFR may play a role in regulating phenylalanine metabolism in the liver and in the production of biogenic amine neurotransmitters and nitric oxide.
