= Cervical cancer-associated transcript 37 =

Protein in the species Homo sapiens

CRAT37

Identifiers
- Aliases: cervical cancer-associated transcript 37
- External IDs: GeneCards:

Gene location (Human)
Chr.	Chromosome 15 (human)
Band	15q26.1	Start	91,408,708 bp
Band	15q26.1	End	91,653,389 bp
RNA expression pattern
Bgee	Human / Mouse (ortholog); Top expressed in: olfactory zone of nasal mucosa; gallbladder; right lobe of liver; islet of Langerhans; ganglionic eminence; muscle of thigh; ventricular zone; body of pancreas; right uterine tube; Achilles tendon / n/a; More reference expression data
BioGPS	n/a
Orthologs
Databases	NCBI: entry; OMA: entry
Species	Human	Mouse
Entrez	101926928	n/a
Ensembl	ENSG00000258551	n/a
UniProt	n a	n/a
RefSeq (mRNA)	n/a	n/a
RefSeq (protein)	n/a	n/a
Location (UCSC)	Chr 15: 91.41 – 91.65 Mb	n/a
PubMed search		n/a
- Wikidata
View/Edit Human

Cervical cancer-associated transcript 37 is a protein that in humans is encoded by the CRAT37 gene.
