= DTWD1 =

Human gene

Identifiers
- Aliases: DTWD1, MDS009, DTW domain containing 1
- External IDs: MGI: 1916435; HomoloGene: 10633; GeneCards: DTWD1; OMA:DTWD1 - orthologs

Gene location (Human)
Chr.	Chromosome 15 (human)
Band	15q21.2	Start	49,621,037 bp
Band	15q21.2	End	49,656,232 bp

Gene location (Mouse)
Chr.	Chromosome 2 (mouse)
Band	2|2 F1	Start	125,994,061 bp
Band	2|2 F1	End	126,007,199 bp
RNA expression pattern
Bgee	Human / Mouse (ortholog); Top expressed in: Achilles tendon; body of pancreas; gastric mucosa; gallbladder; canal of the cervix; left ovary; body of uterus; left uterine tube; tibial nerve; stromal cell of endometrium / Top expressed in: spermatocyte; endocardial cushion; primitive streak; embryo; Region I of hippocampus proper; atrioventricular valve; epiblast; otic placode; embryo; medial ganglionic eminence; More reference expression data
BioGPS	n/a
Orthologs
Species	Human	Mouse
Entrez	56986	69185
Ensembl	ENSG00000104047	ENSMUSG00000023330
UniProt	Q8N5C7	Q9D8U7
RefSeq (mRNA)	NM_001144955; NM_020234	NM_026981; NM_001355583
RefSeq (protein)	NP_001138427; NP_064619	NP_081257; NP_001342512
Location (UCSC)	Chr 15: 49.62 – 49.66 Mb	Chr 2: 125.99 – 126.01 Mb
PubMed search
- Wikidata
View/Edit Human	View/Edit Mouse

DTWD1, DTW domain containing 1, is a human gene. The domain contains multiple conserved motifs including a DTXW motif that this domain has been named.
