= LINC02915 =

RNA gene in humans

Identifiers
- Aliases: LINC02915, chromosome 15 open reading frame 54, chromosome 15 open reading frame 54 (putative), chromosome 15 putative open reading frame 54, long intergenic non-protein coding RNA 2915, C15orf54
- External IDs: GeneCards: LINC02915

Gene location (Human)
Chr.	Chromosome 15 (human)
Band	15q14	Start	39,250,682 bp
Band	15q14	End	39,254,845 bp
RNA expression pattern
Bgee	Human / Mouse (ortholog); Top expressed in: buccal mucosa cell; monocyte; islet of Langerhans; granulocyte; blood; stromal cell of endometrium; gallbladder; appendix; smooth muscle tissue; tibial arteries / n/a; More reference expression data
BioGPS	n/a
Orthologs
Databases	NCBI: entry; OMA: entry
Species	Human	Mouse
Entrez	400360	n/a
Ensembl	ENSG00000175746	n/a
UniProt	n a	n/a
RefSeq (mRNA)	NM_207445; NM_001302797	n/a
RefSeq (protein)	n/a	n/a
Location (UCSC)	Chr 15: 39.25 – 39.25 Mb	n/a
PubMed search		n/a
- Wikidata
View/Edit Human

Long independently transcribed non-coding RNA 2915 is a non-coding RNA that in humans is encoded by the RNA gene LINC02915 (previously denoted C15orf54).

== Gene ==
C15orf54 is located on chromosome 15 from 39542870 to 39547048 on the direct strand. This gene is 4,180 bases in length. The gene is otherwise known as LOC400360 or FLJ39531. The gene contains 2 distinct gt-ag introns and two exons with two alternatively spliced mRNAs, both encoding the same protein. The NCBI accession number is NC_000015.10.

Location of C15orf54 on chromosome 15

== Regulation ==
=== Gene regulation ===
==== Promoter ====
C15orf54 has one predicted promoter sequence. GXP_6084 is located from 39249718 to 39250757 on the plus strand of chromosome 15 and is composed of 1040 bp.

==== Transcription factor binding sites ====
The following table displays the transcription factors most likely to bind to the GXP_6084 promoter for C15orf54.

Matrix Family	Detailed Family Information
TALE	TG-interacting factor belonging to TALE class of homeodomain factors
CART	Binding site for S8 type homeodomains
HAND	T-cell acute lymphocytic leukemia 1, SCL
ZFHX	AREB6 (Atp1a1 regulatory element binding factor 6)
TZAP	Zinc finger and BTB domain containing 48
SAL4	Spalt like 4, DRRS, HSAL4, ZNF797
TEAF	TEA domain family member 4, TEF-3
RUSH	SWI/SNF related, matrix associated, actin dependent regulator of chromatin, subfamily a, member 3
EGRF	Wilms Tumor Suppressor

==== Expression pattern ====
The gene has shown high expression in the prostate, thymus, appendix, bone marrow, and lungs. NCBI AceView shows that the gene is moderately expressed.

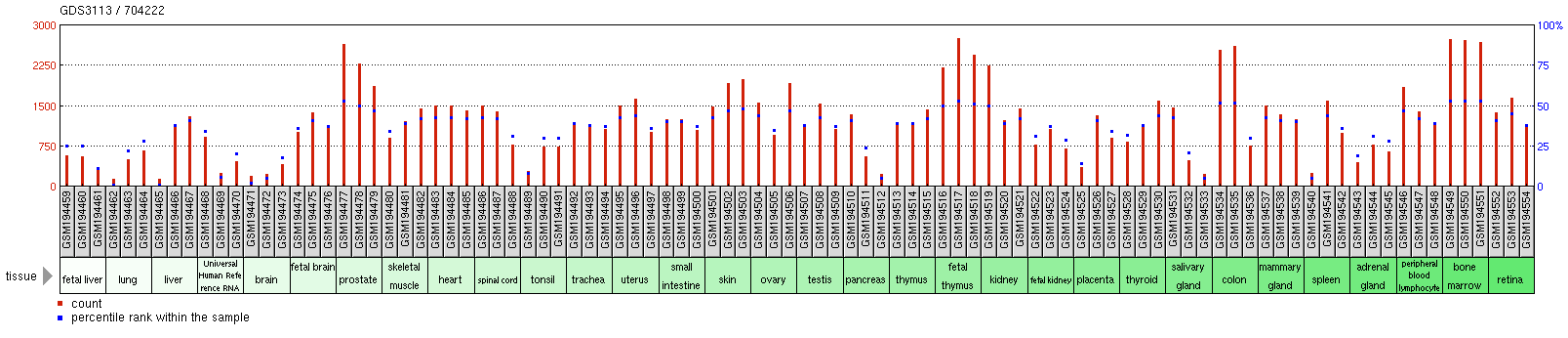
Diagram depicting the expression of C15orf54 in tissues throughout the body.

=== Transcription regulation ===
==== miRNA targeting ====
TargetScan showed that miRNA hsa-miR-375 was highly conserved across various organisms. This miRNA is specifically expressed in the pancreatic islets, brain, and spinal cord. This miRNA has also been shown to be associated with different cancers, including breast and gastric cancer.

== Homology ==
=== Rate of evolution ===
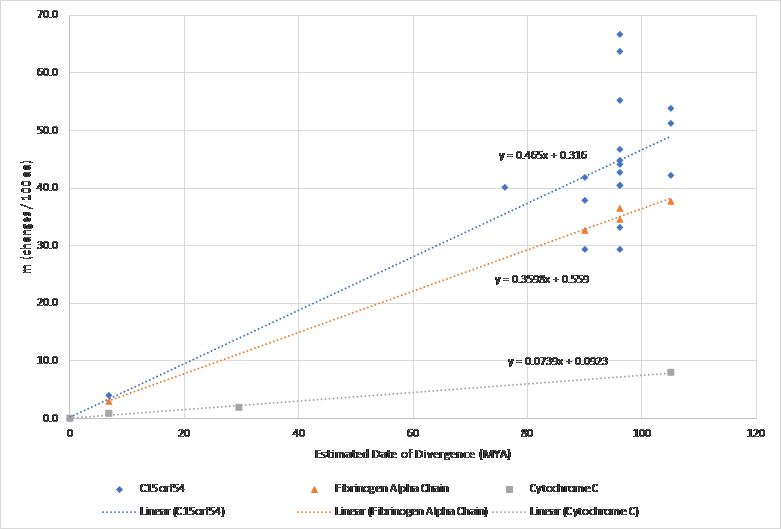
Relative mutation rate of C15orf54 (blue) compared to fibrinogen alpha (grey) and cytochrome C (orange)

=== Paralogs ===
No paralogs of C15orf54 have been detected in the human genome.

=== Orthologs ===
Orthologs were primarily found in primates, although many different mammals also exhibited sizeable sequence similarity to the human C15orf54 sequence. Below is a table of selected orthologs sorted by date of divergence for the C15orf54 gene, including closely and distantly related orthologs. C15orf54 was shown to evolve relatively quickly and evenly over time with a faster rate than both Cytochrome C and Fibrinogen Alpha.

Genus and species	Common name	Taxonomic group	Date of Divergence - Est. Time (MYA)	Accession number	Sequence length (aa)	Sequence identity (%)	Sequence similarity (%)	n	m
Homo sapiens	Humans	Primates	0	NP_001027544.1	803	100	100	0	0.0
Macaca mulatta	Rhesus Macaque	Primates	29.44	AFE75666.1 (extended)	767	91.9	93.9	8.1	8.4
Fukomys damarensis	Damara Mole Rat	Rodentia	90	XP_010621546.2	753	73.6	79.3	26.4	30.7
Camelus ferus	Wild Bactrian Camel	Artiodactyla	94	XP_006175095.2	802	81.8	88.6	18.2	20.1
Odobenus rosmarus divergens	Pacific Walrus	Carnivora	96	XP_012418040.1	806	84.5	90.3	15.5	16.8
Mirounga leonina	Southern Elephant Seal	Carnivora	96	XP_034842573.1	806	83.7	89.8	16.3	17.8
Manis javanica	Malayan Pangolin	Pholidota	96	XP_017502667.1	584	49.4	53.0	50.6	70.5
Echinops telfairi	Lesser Hedgehog Tenrec	Afrosoricida	102	XP_030742207.1	419	31.9	38.9	68.1	114.3
Denticeps clupeoides	Denticle herring	Actinoptergyii/Clupeiformes	435	XP_028809248.1	3037	12.4	16.7	87.6	208.7
Beroe forskalii	Cigar comb jellies	Ctenophora/Beroida	540	AHA51259.1	212	12.0	18.2	88.0	212.0
Araneus ventricosus	Orb weaving Spider	Araneae	736	GBN07005.1	543	30.2	38.9	69.8	119.7
Capitella teleta	Segmented annelid worm	Annelida	797	ELT92884.1	537	31.3	43.3	68.7	116.2
Thelazia callipaeda	Parasitic nematode	Nematoda/Rhabditida	797	VDN04867.1	418	25.2	32.9	74.8	137.8
Drosophila melanogaster	Fruit flies	Diptera	797	NP_650197.1	501	24.4	34.8	75.6	141.1
Octopus sinensis	Common octopus	Octopada/Mollusca	797	XP_029652221.1	5045	6.8	9.2	93.2	268.8
Nematostella vectensis	Starlet Sea Anemone	Cnidaria/Anthozoa	824	EDO31838.1	482	30.7	42.6	69.3	118.1
Macrostomum lignano	Flatworm	Platyhelminthes/Macrostomida	824	PAA81016.1	477	27.0	35.6	73.0	130.9
Salpingoeca rosetta	Choanoflagellates	Choanoflagelletes	1023	XP_004989424.1	480	20.5	28.3	79.5	158.5
Rhizophagus clarus	Arbuscular mycorrhizal fungi	Fungi/Glomerales	1105	GBB86324.1	717	30.1	41.8	69.9	120.1
Salmonella enterica	Gram Negative Bacteria	Salmonella/Enterobacterales	4290	EDQ2188565.1	310	12.8	18.2	87.2	205.6
