= KATNBL1 =

Protein-coding gene in the species Homo sapiens

Identifiers
- Aliases: KATNBL1, C15orf29, katanin regulatory subunit B1 like 1
- External IDs: OMIM: 616235; MGI: 1919675; GeneCards: KATNBL1

Gene location (Human)
Chr.	Chromosome 15 (human)
Band	15q14	Start	34,140,674 bp
Band	15q14	End	34,210,096 bp

Gene location (Mouse)
Chr.	Chromosome 2 (mouse)
Band	2|2 E3	Start	112,209,556 bp
Band	2|2 E3	End	112,244,585 bp
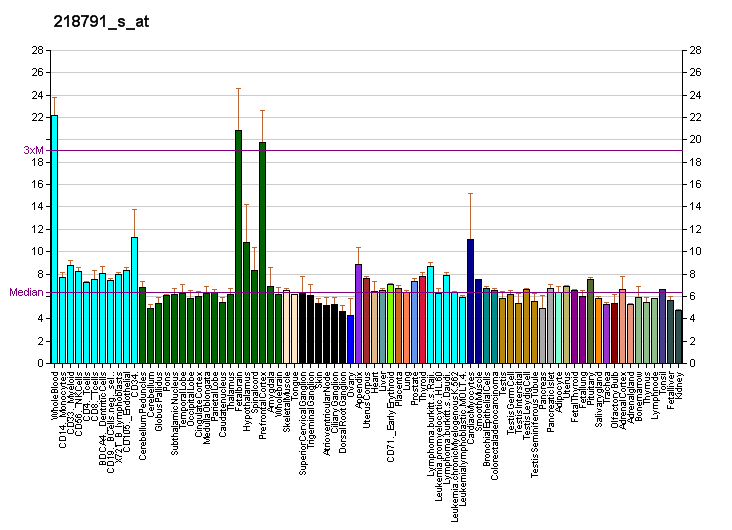
RNA expression pattern
Bgee	Human / Mouse (ortholog); Top expressed in: vagina; tibial nerve; buccal mucosa cell; amniotic fluid; oral cavity; sperm; ectocervix; rectum; body of uterus; skin of abdomen / Top expressed in: zygote; hand; secondary oocyte; cumulus cell; Rostral migratory stream; pineal gland; primary oocyte; epidermis; hair follicle; otolith organ; More reference expression data
BioGPS	More reference expression data
Gene ontology
Molecular function	protein binding
Cellular component	nucleolus; spindle pole; nucleus; cytoplasm; cytoskeleton; mitotic spindle pole
Biological process	positive regulation of cytoskeleton organization
Sources:Amigo / QuickGO
Orthologs
Databases	NCBI: entry; OMA: entry
Species	Human	Mouse
Entrez	79768	72425
Ensembl	ENSG00000134152	ENSMUSG00000027132
UniProt	Q9H079	Q9CWJ3
RefSeq (mRNA)	NM_024713	NM_024254
RefSeq (protein)	NP_078989	NP_077216
Location (UCSC)	Chr 15: 34.14 – 34.21 Mb	Chr 2: 112.21 – 112.24 Mb
PubMed search
- Wikidata
View/Edit Human	View/Edit Mouse

KATNBL1 is a protein that in humans is encoded by the KATNBL1 gene.
