= SNAPC5 =

Protein-coding gene in the species Homo sapiens

Identifiers
- Aliases: SNAPC5, SNAP19, small nuclear RNA activating complex polypeptide 5
- External IDs: OMIM: 605979; MGI: 1914282; HomoloGene: 4414; GeneCards: SNAPC5; OMA:SNAPC5 - orthologs

Gene location (Human)
Chr.	Chromosome 15 (human)
Band	15q22.31	Start	66,490,135 bp
Band	15q22.31	End	66,497,780 bp

Gene location (Mouse)
Chr.	Chromosome 9 (mouse)
Band	9|9 C	Start	64,086,556 bp
Band	9|9 C	End	64,090,414 bp
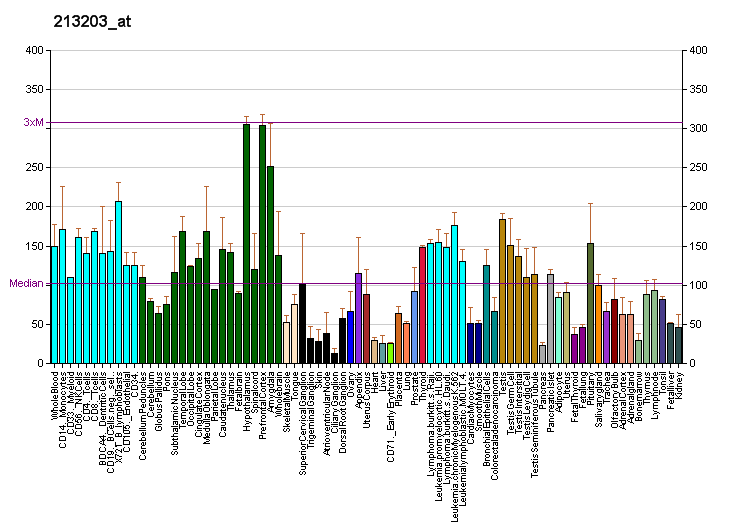
RNA expression pattern
Bgee	Human / Mouse (ortholog); Top expressed in: endothelial cell; middle temporal gyrus; sperm; Brodmann area 23; palpebral conjunctiva; gastrocnemius muscle; Epithelium of choroid plexus; vastus lateralis muscle; glutes; prefrontal cortex / Top expressed in: interventricular septum; granulocyte; morula; right kidney; blastocyst; neural layer of retina; yolk sac; esophagus; superior cervical ganglion; muscle of thigh; More reference expression data
BioGPS	More reference expression data
Gene ontology
Molecular function	DNA-binding transcription factor activity; protein binding
Cellular component	nucleolus; nucleus; nucleoplasm; nuclear body
Biological process	regulation of transcription, DNA-templated; transcription by RNA polymerase II; transcription initiation from RNA polymerase III promoter; transcription, DNA-templated; snRNA transcription by RNA polymerase II
Sources:Amigo / QuickGO
Orthologs
Species	Human	Mouse
Entrez	10302	330959
Ensembl	ENSG00000174446	ENSMUSG00000032398
UniProt	O75971	Q8R2K7
RefSeq (mRNA)	NM_001329613; NM_001329614; NM_001329615; NM_006049	NM_183316; NM_025925
RefSeq (protein)	NP_001316542; NP_001316543; NP_001316544; NP_006040	NP_899139
Location (UCSC)	Chr 15: 66.49 – 66.5 Mb	Chr 9: 64.09 – 64.09 Mb
PubMed search
- Wikidata
View/Edit Human	View/Edit Mouse

snRNA-activating protein complex subunit 5 is a protein that in humans is encoded by the SNAPC5 gene.
