= HMG20A =

Protein-coding gene in the species Homo sapiens

Identifiers
- Aliases: HMG20A, HMGX1, HMGXB1, high mobility group 20A
- External IDs: OMIM: 605534; MGI: 1914117; GeneCards: HMG20A

Gene location (Human)
Chr.	Chromosome 15 (human)
Band	15q24.3	Start	77,420,412 bp
Band	15q24.3	End	77,485,607 bp

Gene location (Mouse)
Chr.	Chromosome 9 (mouse)
Band	9|9 B	Start	56,325,893 bp
Band	9|9 B	End	56,404,220 bp
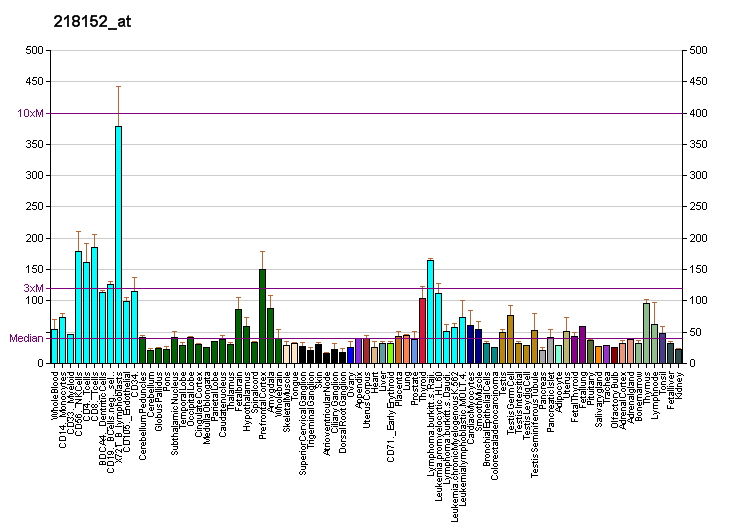
RNA expression pattern
Bgee	Human / Mouse (ortholog); Top expressed in: epithelium of colon; oocyte; secondary oocyte; embryo; ganglionic eminence; tibia; prefrontal cortex; vastus lateralis muscle; tonsil; rectum / Top expressed in: nucleus of stria terminalis; zygote; secondary oocyte; vestibular sensory epithelium; medial dorsal nucleus; subiculum; superior colliculus; medial geniculate nucleus; olfactory tubercle; paraventricular nucleus of hypothalamus; More reference expression data
BioGPS	More reference expression data
Gene ontology
Molecular function	DNA-binding transcription factor activity; protein heterodimerization activity; DNA binding; protein binding; identical protein binding; DNA-binding transcription factor activity, RNA polymerase II-specific
Cellular component	nucleus
Biological process	regulation of transcription, DNA-templated; negative regulation of transcription by RNA polymerase II; negative regulation of neuron differentiation; transcription, DNA-templated; negative regulation of protein sumoylation; chromatin organization
Sources:Amigo / QuickGO
Orthologs
Databases	NCBI: entry; OMA: entry
Species	Human	Mouse
Entrez	10363	66867
Ensembl	ENSG00000140382	ENSMUSG00000032329
UniProt	Q9NP66	Q9DC33
RefSeq (mRNA)	NM_001304504; NM_001304505; NM_018200	NM_025812
RefSeq (protein)	NP_001291433; NP_001291434; NP_060670	NP_080088
Location (UCSC)	Chr 15: 77.42 – 77.49 Mb	Chr 9: 56.33 – 56.4 Mb
PubMed search
- Wikidata
View/Edit Human	View/Edit Mouse

High mobility group protein 20A is a protein that in humans is encoded by the HMG20A gene.
