= MIR1282 =

Identifiers
- Aliases: MIR1282, MIRN1282, hsa-mir-1282, microRNA 1282
- External IDs: GeneCards: MIR1282; OMA:MIR1282 - orthologs

Gene location (Human)
Chr.	Chromosome 15 (human)
Band	15q15.3	Start	43,793,659 bp
Band	15q15.3	End	43,793,759 bp
RNA expression pattern
Bgee	Human / Mouse (ortholog); Top expressed in: sural nerve; olfactory zone of nasal mucosa; gastrocnemius muscle; blood; dorsolateral prefrontal cortex; Achilles tendon; heart; upper lobe of left lung; left ventricle; left lobe of thyroid gland / n/a; More reference expression data
BioGPS	n/a
Orthologs
Species	Human	Mouse
Entrez	100302254	n/a
Ensembl	ENSG00000221792	n/a
UniProt	n a	n/a
RefSeq (mRNA)	n/a	n/a
RefSeq (protein)	n/a	n/a
Location (UCSC)	Chr 15: 43.79 – 43.79 Mb	n/a
PubMed search		n/a
- Wikidata
View/Edit Human

MicroRNA 1282 is a protein that in humans is encoded by the MIR1282 gene.

== Function ==
microRNAs (miRNAs) are short (20-24 nt) non-coding RNAs that are involved in post-transcriptional regulation of gene expression in multicellular organisms by affecting both the stability and translation of mRNAs. miRNAs are transcribed by RNA polymerase II as part of capped and polyadenylated primary transcripts (pri-miRNAs) that can be either protein-coding or non-coding. The primary transcript is cleaved by the Drosha ribonuclease III enzyme to produce an approximately 70-nt stem-loop precursor miRNA (pre-miRNA), which is further cleaved by the cytoplasmic Dicer ribonuclease to generate the mature miRNA and antisense miRNA star (miRNA*) products. The mature miRNA is incorporated into a RNA-induced silencing complex (RISC), which recognizes target mRNAs through imperfect base pairing with the miRNA and most commonly results in translational inhibition or destabilization of the target mRNA. The RefSeq represents the predicted microRNA stem-loop. [provided by RefSeq, Sep 2009].
