= SCAMP5 =

Protein-coding gene in the species Homo sapiens

Identifiers
- Aliases: SCAMP5, secretory carrier membrane protein 5
- External IDs: OMIM: 613766; MGI: 1928948; GeneCards: SCAMP5

Gene location (Human)
Chr.	Chromosome 15 (human)
Band	15q24.2	Start	74,957,219 bp
Band	15q24.2	End	75,021,495 bp

Gene location (Mouse)
Chr.	Chromosome 9 (mouse)
Band	9|9 B	Start	57,348,610 bp
Band	9|9 B	End	57,375,343 bp
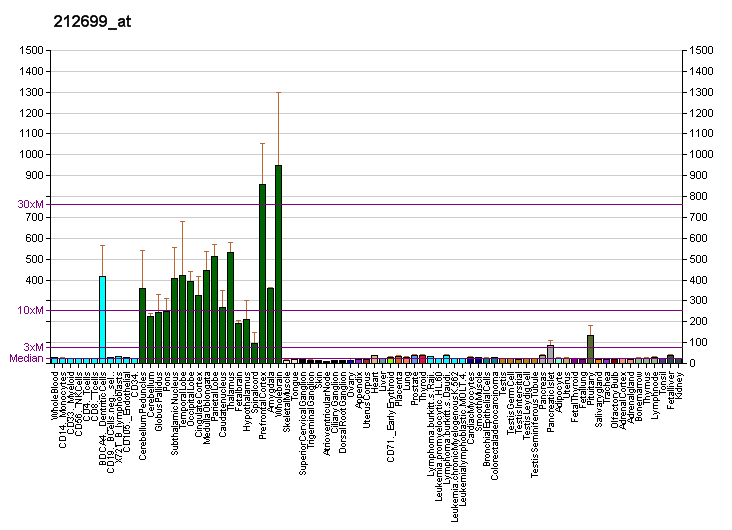
RNA expression pattern
Bgee	Human / Mouse (ortholog); Top expressed in: right hemisphere of cerebellum; right frontal lobe; prefrontal cortex; anterior cingulate cortex; Brodmann area 9; Brodmann area 10; nucleus accumbens; amygdala; islet of Langerhans; caudate nucleus / Top expressed in: neural layer of retina; dentate gyrus of hippocampal formation granule cell; primary visual cortex; superior frontal gyrus; cerebellar cortex; central gray substance of midbrain; subiculum; nucleus of stria terminalis; hippocampus proper; prefrontal cortex; More reference expression data
BioGPS	More reference expression data
Gene ontology
Molecular function	protein binding; protein-containing complex binding
Cellular component	integral component of membrane; cell junction; Golgi membrane; recycling endosome membrane; plasma membrane; endosome; Golgi apparatus; SNARE complex; synapse; trans-Golgi network membrane; synaptic vesicle membrane; membrane; cytoplasmic vesicle
Biological process	protein transport; negative regulation of endocytosis; response to endoplasmic reticulum stress; exocytosis; positive regulation of calcium ion-dependent exocytosis
Sources:Amigo / QuickGO
Orthologs
Databases	NCBI: entry; OMA: entry
Species	Human	Mouse
Entrez	192683	56807
Ensembl	ENSG00000198794	ENSMUSG00000040722
UniProt	Q8TAC9	Q9JKD3
RefSeq (mRNA)	NM_001178111; NM_001178112; NM_138967	NM_001301634; NM_001301635; NM_020270
RefSeq (protein)	NP_001171582; NP_001171583; NP_620417; NP_001171582.1; NP_001171583.1 NP_620417.1	NP_001288563; NP_001288564; NP_064666
Location (UCSC)	Chr 15: 74.96 – 75.02 Mb	Chr 9: 57.35 – 57.38 Mb
PubMed search
- Wikidata
View/Edit Human	View/Edit Mouse

Secretory carrier-associated membrane protein 5 is a protein that in humans is encoded by the SCAMP5 gene.
