= TMCO5A =

Protein-coding gene in the species Homo sapiens

Identifiers
- Aliases: TMCO5A, TMCO5, transmembrane and coiled-coil domains 5A
- External IDs: MGI: 1914606; HomoloGene: 41661; GeneCards: TMCO5A; OMA:TMCO5A - orthologs

Gene location (Human)
Chr.	Chromosome 15 (human)
Band	15q14	Start	37,921,939 bp
Band	15q14	End	37,967,724 bp

Gene location (Mouse)
Chr.	Chromosome 2 (mouse)
Band	2|2 E5	Start	116,709,172 bp
Band	2|2 E5	End	116,722,975 bp
RNA expression pattern
Bgee	Human / Mouse (ortholog); Top expressed in: left testis; right testis; sperm; testicle; lower lobe of lung; olfactory zone of nasal mucosa; right uterine tube; gallbladder; skin of thigh; gonad / Top expressed in: spermatid; seminiferous tubule; spermatocyte; zygote; embryo; superior frontal gyrus; primary visual cortex; dentate gyrus of hippocampal formation granule cell; secondary oocyte; primary oocyte; More reference expression data
BioGPS	n/a
Orthologs
Species	Human	Mouse
Entrez	145942	67356
Ensembl	ENSG00000166069	ENSMUSG00000027355
UniProt	Q8N6Q1	Q9D9D5
RefSeq (mRNA)	NM_152453; NM_001330255	NM_026104; NM_001355572; NM_001379337
RefSeq (protein)	NP_001317184; NP_689666; NP_001357664; NP_001357665; NP_001357666	NP_080380; NP_001342501; NP_001366266
Location (UCSC)	Chr 15: 37.92 – 37.97 Mb	Chr 2: 116.71 – 116.72 Mb
PubMed search
- Wikidata
View/Edit Human	View/Edit Mouse

Transmembrane and coiled-coil domains 5A is a protein that in humans is encoded by the TMCO5A gene.
