= CLK3 (gene) =

Protein-coding gene in humans

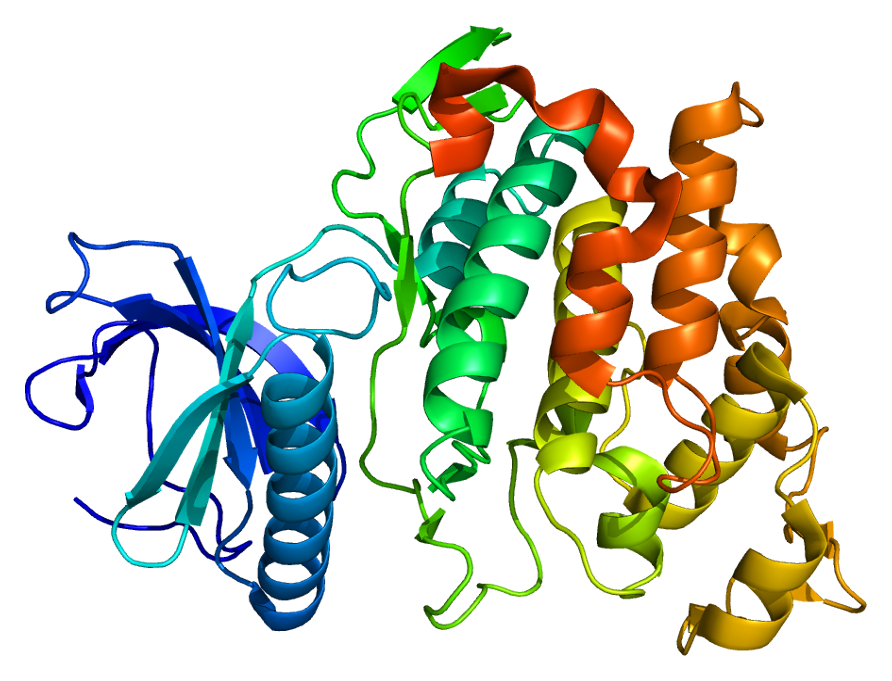

Identifiers
- Aliases: CLK3, PHPHCLK3/152, CDC like kinase 3
- External IDs: OMIM: 602990; MGI: 1098670; GeneCards: CLK3
Available structures
PDB	Ortholog search: PDBe RCSB
PDB	List of PDB id codes 2EU9, 2EXE, 2WU6, 2WU7, 3RAW
Enzyme activity
EC #	BRENDA	ExPASy	KEGG	MetaCyc
2.7.12.1	↗	↗	↗	↗

Gene location (Human)
Chr.	Chromosome 15 (human)
Band	15q24.1	Start	74,598,500 bp
Band	15q24.1	End	74,645,414 bp

Gene location (Mouse)
Chr.	Chromosome 9 (mouse)
Band	9|9 B	Start	57,657,907 bp
Band	9|9 B	End	57,673,143 bp
RNA expression pattern
Bgee	Human / Mouse (ortholog); Top expressed in: granulocyte; left testis; right testis; monocyte; anterior pituitary; left lobe of thyroid gland; mucosa of transverse colon; skin of leg; minor salivary glands; skin of abdomen / Top expressed in: thymus; granulocyte; lip; muscle of thigh; aortic valve; ascending aorta; neural layer of retina; fetal liver hematopoietic progenitor cell; superior surface of tongue; spermatid; More reference expression data
BioGPS	n/a
Gene ontology
Molecular function	transferase activity; nucleotide binding; protein kinase activity; kinase activity; protein serine/threonine kinase activity; protein binding; protein serine/threonine/tyrosine kinase activity; protein tyrosine kinase activity; ATP binding; identical protein binding; RNA binding
Cellular component	cytoplasm; nuclear speck; membrane; nucleoplasm; acrosomal vesicle; intermediate filament cytoskeleton; cytoplasmic vesicle; nucleus
Biological process	phosphorylation; protein phosphorylation; regulation of RNA splicing; protein autophosphorylation; peptidyl-tyrosine phosphorylation
Sources:Amigo / QuickGO
Orthologs
Databases	NCBI: entry; OMA: entry
Species	Human	Mouse
Entrez	1198	102414
Ensembl	ENSG00000179335	ENSMUSG00000032316
UniProt	P49761	O35492
RefSeq (mRNA)	NM_001130028; NM_001292; NM_003992	NM_007713
RefSeq (protein)	NP_001123500; NP_003983	NP_031739
Location (UCSC)	Chr 15: 74.6 – 74.65 Mb	Chr 9: 57.66 – 57.67 Mb
PubMed search
- Wikidata
View/Edit Human	View/Edit Mouse

Dual specificity protein kinase CLK3 is an enzyme that in humans is encoded by the CLK3 gene. The CLK3 gene encodes a serine/threonine type protein kinase with a non-conserved N-terminal domain. A long and short isoform (phclk3 and pclk3/152) result from alternative splicing and coexist in different tissues. Isoform phclk3/152 lacks the kinase domain.
