= GLCE =

Protein-coding gene in the species Homo sapiens

Identifiers
- Aliases: GLCE, HSEPI, glucuronic acid epimerase
- External IDs: OMIM: 612134; MGI: 2136405; HomoloGene: 14111; GeneCards: GLCE; OMA:GLCE - orthologs

Gene location (Human)
Chr.	Chromosome 15 (human)
Band	15q23	Start	69,160,584 bp
Band	15q23	End	69,272,217 bp

Gene location (Mouse)
Chr.	Chromosome 9 (mouse)
Band	9|9 B	Start	61,964,530 bp
Band	9|9 B	End	62,029,937 bp
RNA expression pattern
Bgee	Human / Mouse (ortholog); Top expressed in: cerebellar hemisphere; right hemisphere of cerebellum; Achilles tendon; ganglionic eminence; rectum; endothelial cell; islet of Langerhans; secondary oocyte; gonad; monocyte / Top expressed in: saccule; otic placode; primary oocyte; secondary oocyte; otic vesicle; cumulus cell; medullary collecting duct; nucleus accumbens; genital tubercle; Gonadal ridge; More reference expression data
BioGPS	n/a
Gene ontology
Molecular function	racemase and epimerase activity, acting on carbohydrates and derivatives; isomerase activity; heparosan-N-sulfate-glucuronate 5-epimerase activity
Cellular component	integral component of membrane; Golgi membrane; Golgi apparatus; membrane
Biological process	heparan sulfate proteoglycan biosynthetic process; heparin biosynthetic process; glycosaminoglycan biosynthetic process
Sources:Amigo / QuickGO
Orthologs
Species	Human	Mouse
Entrez	26035	93683
Ensembl	ENSG00000138604	ENSMUSG00000032252
UniProt	O94923	Q9EPS3
RefSeq (mRNA)	NM_015554; NM_001324091; NM_001324092; NM_001324093; NM_001324094	NM_033320; NM_001368304
RefSeq (protein)	NP_001311020; NP_001311021; NP_001311022; NP_001311023; NP_056369	NP_201577; NP_001355233
Location (UCSC)	Chr 15: 69.16 – 69.27 Mb	Chr 9: 61.96 – 62.03 Mb
PubMed search
- Wikidata
View/Edit Human	View/Edit Mouse

D-glucuronyl C5-epimerase is an enzyme that in humans is encoded by the GLCE gene.
