= MIR9-3HG =

Identifiers
- Aliases: MIR9-3HG, LINC00925, MIR9-3 host gene
- External IDs: GeneCards: MIR9-3HG

Gene location (Human)
Chr.	Chromosome 15 (human)
Band	15q26.1	Start	89,361,579 bp
Band	15q26.1	End	89,398,487 bp
RNA expression pattern
Bgee	Human / Mouse (ortholog); Top expressed in: ventricular zone; ganglionic eminence; right hemisphere of cerebellum; right testis; left testis; right frontal lobe; cingulate gyrus; anterior cingulate cortex; Brodmann area 9; cerebellar vermis / n/a; More reference expression data
BioGPS	n/a
Orthologs
Databases	NCBI: entry; OMA: entry
Species	Human	Mouse
Entrez	254559	n/a
Ensembl	ENSG00000255571	n/a
UniProt	n a	n/a
RefSeq (mRNA)	n/a	n/a
RefSeq (protein)	n/a	n/a
Location (UCSC)	Chr 15: 89.36 – 89.4 Mb	n/a
PubMed search		n/a
- Wikidata
View/Edit Human

MIR9-3 host gene is a protein that in humans is encoded by the MIR9-3HG gene.
