= Nucleolar and spindle associated protein 1 =

Protein-coding gene in the species Homo sapiens

NUSAP1

Identifiers
- Aliases: NUSAP1, ANKT, BM037, LNP, NUSAP, PRO0310p1, Q0310, SAPL, nucleolar and spindle associated protein 1
- External IDs: OMIM: 612818; MGI: 2675669; GeneCards: NUSAP1

Gene location (Human)
Chr.	Chromosome 15 (human)
Band	15q15.1	Start	41,320,794 bp
Band	15q15.1	End	41,381,050 bp

Gene location (Mouse)
Chr.	Chromosome 2 (mouse)
Band	2|2 E5	Start	119,448,779 bp
Band	2|2 E5	End	119,481,725 bp
RNA expression pattern
Bgee	Human / Mouse (ortholog); Top expressed in: ventricular zone; ganglionic eminence; bone marrow; bone marrow cell; gonad; appendix; lymph node; stromal cell of endometrium; rectum; right adrenal cortex / Top expressed in: genital tubercle; fetal liver hematopoietic progenitor cell; medial ganglionic eminence; blood; primary oocyte; tibiofemoral joint; zygote; tail of embryo; dermis; thymus; More reference expression data
BioGPS	n/a
Gene ontology
Molecular function	microtubule binding; DNA binding; protein binding; RNA binding
Cellular component	spindle; spindle microtubule; cytoskeleton; microtubule; chromosome; nucleus; nucleolus; cytoplasm; mitotic spindle
Biological process	cell division; cell cycle; mitotic cytokinesis; mitotic chromosome condensation; establishment of mitotic spindle localization; positive regulation of mitotic nuclear division; microtubule cytoskeleton organization; mitotic sister chromatid segregation
Sources:Amigo / QuickGO
Orthologs
Databases	NCBI: entry; OMA: entry
Species	Human	Mouse
Entrez	51203	108907
Ensembl	ENSG00000137804	ENSMUSG00000027306
UniProt	Q9BXS6	Q9ERH4
RefSeq (mRNA)	NM_001129897; NM_001243142; NM_001243143; NM_001243144; NM_001301136 NM_016359; NM_018454	NM_001042652; NM_133851
RefSeq (protein)	NP_001230071; NP_001230072; NP_001230073; NP_001288065; NP_057443 NP_060924	NP_001036117; NP_598612
Location (UCSC)	Chr 15: 41.32 – 41.38 Mb	Chr 2: 119.45 – 119.48 Mb
PubMed search
- Wikidata
View/Edit Human	View/Edit Mouse

Nucleolar and spindle associated protein 1 is a protein that in humans is encoded by the NUSAP1 gene.

== Function ==
NUSAP1 is a nucleolar-spindle-associated protein that plays a role in spindle microtubule organization (Raemaekers et al., 2003 [PubMed 12963707]).[supplied by OMIM, Jun 2009].
