= COMMD4 =

Protein-coding gene in humans

Identifiers
- Aliases: COMMD4, COMM domain containing 4
- External IDs: OMIM: 616701; MGI: 1913449; GeneCards: COMMD4

Gene location (Human)
Chr.	Chromosome 15 (human)
Band	15q24.2	Start	75,336,020 bp
Band	15q24.2	End	75,343,224 bp

Gene location (Mouse)
Chr.	Chromosome 9 (mouse)
Band	9|9 B	Start	57,062,319 bp
Band	9|9 B	End	57,065,615 bp
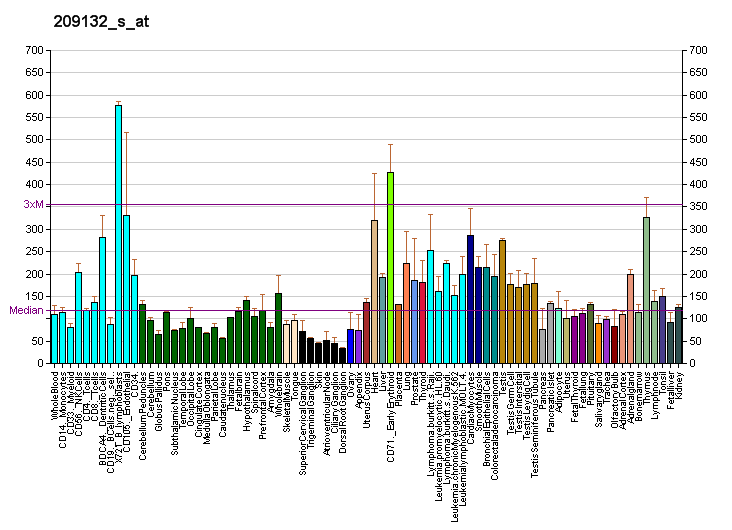

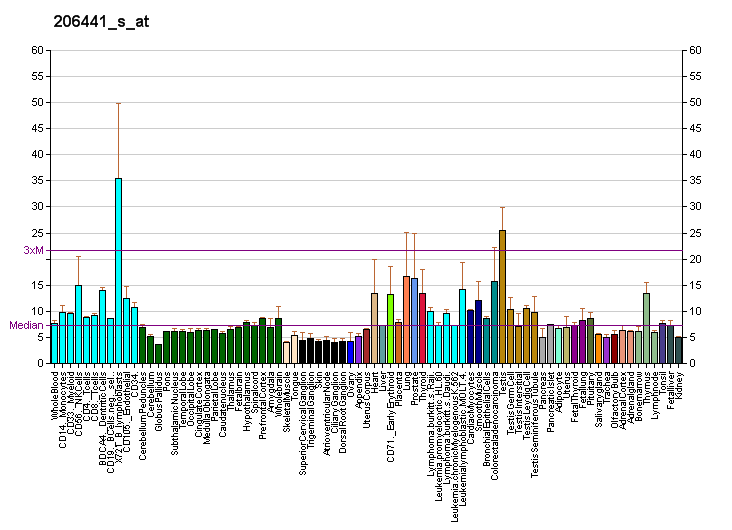

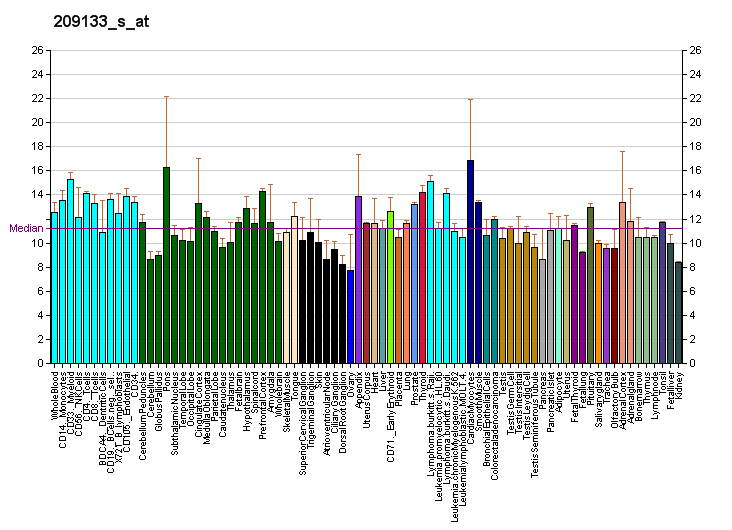
RNA expression pattern
Bgee	Human / Mouse (ortholog); Top expressed in: left testis; right testis; right adrenal gland; right adrenal cortex; left adrenal cortex; granulocyte; mucosa of transverse colon; apex of heart; stromal cell of endometrium; body of stomach / Top expressed in: yolk sac; blastocyst; right kidney; ventricular zone; neural layer of retina; thymus; superior frontal gyrus; lip; otic placode; embryo; More reference expression data
BioGPS	More reference expression data
Gene ontology
Molecular function	protein binding
Cellular component	cytoplasm; nucleus
Biological process	transcription, DNA-templated; regulation of transcription, DNA-templated
Sources:Amigo / QuickGO
Orthologs
Databases	NCBI: entry; OMA: entry
Species	Human	Mouse
Entrez	54939	66199
Ensembl	ENSG00000140365	ENSMUSG00000032299
UniProt	Q9H0A8	Q9CQ02
RefSeq (mRNA)	NM_001284377; NM_001284378; NM_001284379; NM_017828; NM_001321844 NM_001321845; NM_001321846; NM_001321847; NM_001321848	NM_025417
RefSeq (protein)	NP_001271306; NP_001271307; NP_001271308; NP_001308773; NP_001308774 NP_001308775; NP_001308776; NP_001308777; NP_060298	NP_079693
Location (UCSC)	Chr 15: 75.34 – 75.34 Mb	Chr 9: 57.06 – 57.07 Mb
PubMed search
- Wikidata
View/Edit Human	View/Edit Mouse

COMM domain-containing protein 4 is a protein that in humans is encoded by the COMMD4 gene.
