= LINC00926 =

Identifiers
- Aliases: LINC00926, long intergenic non-protein coding RNA 926
- External IDs: GeneCards: LINC00926

Gene location (Human)
Chr.	Chromosome 15 (human)
Band	15q21.3	Start	57,300,365 bp
Band	15q21.3	End	57,307,769 bp
RNA expression pattern
Bgee	Human / Mouse (ortholog); Top expressed in: spleen; lymph node; granulocyte; appendix; skin of arm; blood; vena cava; tonsil; superficial temporal artery; mucosa of ileum / n/a; More reference expression data
BioGPS	n/a
Orthologs
Databases	NCBI: entry; OMA: entry
Species	Human	Mouse
Entrez	283663	n/a
Ensembl	ENSG00000247982	n/a
UniProt	n a	n/a
RefSeq (mRNA)	n/a	n/a
RefSeq (protein)	n/a	n/a
Location (UCSC)	Chr 15: 57.3 – 57.31 Mb	n/a
PubMed search		n/a
- Wikidata
View/Edit Human

Long intergenic non-protein coding RNA 926 is a non-coding RNA that in humans is encoded by the LINC00926 gene.
