= LCMT2 =

Protein-coding gene in the species Homo sapiens

Identifiers
- Aliases: LCMT2, PPM2, TYW4, leucine carboxyl methyltransferase 2
- External IDs: OMIM: 611246; MGI: 1353659; GeneCards: LCMT2
Enzyme activity
EC #	BRENDA	ExPASy	KEGG	MetaCyc
2.1.1.290	↗	↗	↗	↗
2.3.1.231	↗	↗	↗	↗

Gene location (Human)
Chr.	Chromosome 15 (human)
Band	15q15.3	Start	43,323,649 bp
Band	15q15.3	End	43,330,582 bp

Gene location (Mouse)
Chr.	Chromosome 2 (mouse)
Band	2|2 E5	Start	120,958,788 bp
Band	2|2 E5	End	120,971,134 bp
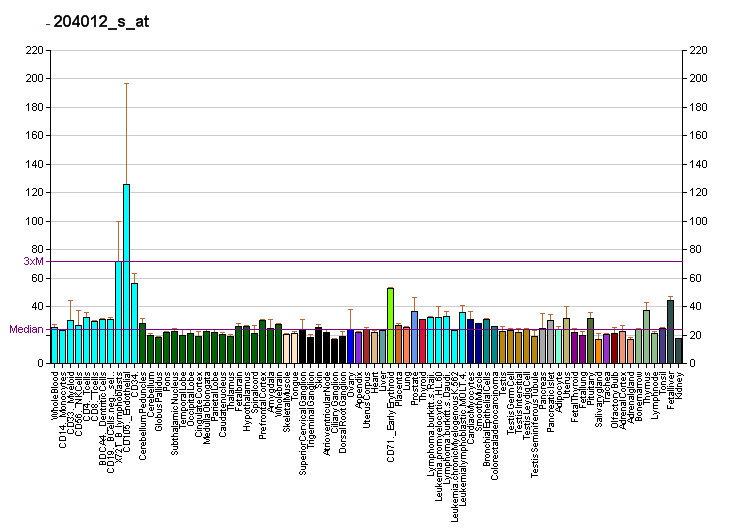
RNA expression pattern
Bgee	Human / Mouse (ortholog); Top expressed in: hair follicle; germinal epithelium; gingival epithelium; kidney tubule; glomerulus; metanephric glomerulus; gonad; palpebral conjunctiva; epithelium of nasopharynx; retinal pigment epithelium / Top expressed in: right kidney; proximal tubule; otic vesicle; right ventricle; medullary collecting duct; medial ganglionic eminence; islet of Langerhans; epithelium of stomach; primitive streak; renal corpuscle; More reference expression data
BioGPS	More reference expression data
Gene ontology
Molecular function	methyltransferase activity; transferase activity; protein binding; S-adenosylmethionine-dependent methyltransferase activity; tRNA methyltransferase activity; protein C-terminal leucine carboxyl O-methyltransferase activity
Cellular component	cytoplasm; cytosol
Biological process	tRNA modification; methylation; tRNA methylation; wybutosine biosynthetic process; tRNA processing; C-terminal protein methylation
Sources:Amigo / QuickGO
Orthologs
Databases	NCBI: entry; OMA: entry
Species	Human	Mouse
Entrez	9836	329504
Ensembl	ENSG00000168806	ENSMUSG00000074890
UniProt	O60294	Q8BYR1
RefSeq (mRNA)	NM_014793	NM_177846
RefSeq (protein)	NP_055608	NP_808514
Location (UCSC)	Chr 15: 43.32 – 43.33 Mb	Chr 2: 120.96 – 120.97 Mb
PubMed search
- Wikidata
View/Edit Human	View/Edit Mouse

Leucine carboxyl methyltransferase 2 is an enzyme that in humans is encoded by the LCMT2 gene.

The protein encoded by this intronless gene belongs to the methyltransferase superfamily and acts as a G_{1}/S and G_{2}/M phase checkpoint regulator. It has been hypothesized that cigarette smoke-induced oxidative stress and transforming growth factor beta 1 may inhibit cellular proliferation by modulating the expression of this protein.
