= SCAMP2 =

Protein-coding gene in the species Homo sapiens

Identifiers
- Aliases: SCAMP2, secretory carrier membrane protein 2
- External IDs: OMIM: 606912; MGI: 1346518; GeneCards: SCAMP2

Gene location (Human)
Chr.	Chromosome 15 (human)
Band	15q24.1	Start	74,843,730 bp
Band	15q24.1	End	74,873,365 bp

Gene location (Mouse)
Chr.	Chromosome 9 (mouse)
Band	9|9 B	Start	57,468,226 bp
Band	9|9 B	End	57,496,078 bp
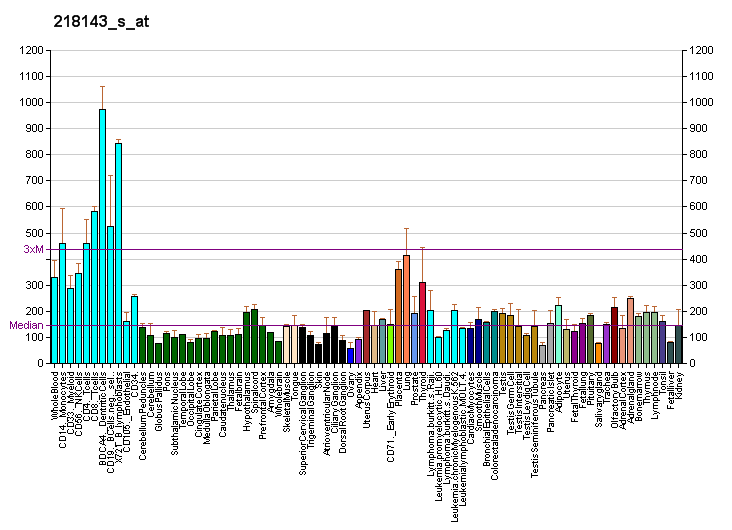
RNA expression pattern
Bgee	Human / Mouse (ortholog); Top expressed in: rectum; mucosa of transverse colon; granulocyte; islet of Langerhans; minor salivary glands; mucosa of ileum; lymph node; body of stomach; right lung; gallbladder / Top expressed in: spermatid; granulocyte; stroma of bone marrow; corneal stroma; epithelium of stomach; tibiofemoral joint; large intestine; colon; lip; proximal tubule; More reference expression data
BioGPS	More reference expression data
Gene ontology
Molecular function	protein binding
Cellular component	integral component of membrane; endosome; recycling endosome membrane; Golgi apparatus; trans-Golgi network membrane; extracellular exosome; transport vesicle; intracellular membrane-bounded organelle; membrane; Golgi membrane
Biological process	protein transport; post-Golgi vesicle-mediated transport; transport
Sources:Amigo / QuickGO
Orthologs
Databases	NCBI: entry; OMA: entry
Species	Human	Mouse
Entrez	10066	24044
Ensembl	ENSG00000140497	ENSMUSG00000040188
UniProt	O15127	Q9ERN0
RefSeq (mRNA)	NM_005697; NM_001320778	NM_022813; NM_001378928
RefSeq (protein)	NP_001307707; NP_005688	NP_073724; NP_001365857
Location (UCSC)	Chr 15: 74.84 – 74.87 Mb	Chr 9: 57.47 – 57.5 Mb
PubMed search
- Wikidata
View/Edit Human	View/Edit Mouse

Secretory carrier-associated membrane protein 2 is a protein that in humans is encoded by the SCAMP2 gene.

This gene product belongs to the SCAMP family of proteins which are secretory carrier membrane proteins. They function as carriers to the cell surface in post-golgi recycling pathways. Different family members are highly related products of distinct genes, and are usually expressed together. These findings suggest that the SCAMPs may function at the same site during vesicular transport rather than in separate pathways.
