= SERF2 =

Protein-coding gene in the species Homo sapiens

Identifiers
- Aliases: SERF2, 4F5REL, FAM2C, H4F5REL, HsT17089, small EDRK-rich factor 2
- External IDs: OMIM: 605054; MGI: 1337041; HomoloGene: 85994; GeneCards: SERF2; OMA:SERF2 - orthologs

Gene location (Human)
Chr.	Chromosome 15 (human)
Band	15q15.3	Start	43,777,087 bp
Band	15q15.3	End	43,804,427 bp

Gene location (Mouse)
Chr.	Chromosome 2 (mouse)
Band	2|2 E5	Start	121,279,676 bp
Band	2|2 E5	End	121,288,794 bp
RNA expression pattern
Bgee	Human / Mouse (ortholog); Top expressed in: mucosa of transverse colon; right adrenal cortex; stromal cell of endometrium; left adrenal gland; left adrenal cortex; right testis; left testis; right lobe of thyroid gland; prostate; left lobe of thyroid gland / Top expressed in: white adipose tissue; quadriceps femoris muscle; right kidney; duodenum; urinary bladder; adrenal gland; blastocyst; heart; lens; jejunum; More reference expression data
BioGPS	n/a
Gene ontology
Molecular function	molecular function
Cellular component	cytosol; nucleus
Biological process	biological process
Sources:Amigo / QuickGO
Orthologs
Species	Human	Mouse
Entrez	10169	378702
Ensembl	ENSG00000140264	ENSMUSG00000074884
UniProt	P84101	P84102
RefSeq (mRNA)	NM_001018108; NM_001199875; NM_001199876; NM_001199877; NM_001199878 NM_005770	NM_001290837; NM_011354
RefSeq (protein)	NP_001018118; NP_001186804; NP_001186805; NP_001186806; NP_001186807	NP_001277766; NP_035484
Location (UCSC)	Chr 15: 43.78 – 43.8 Mb	Chr 2: 121.28 – 121.29 Mb
PubMed search
- Wikidata
View/Edit Human	View/Edit Mouse

Small EDRK-rich factor 2 is a protein that in humans is encoded by the SERF2 gene.
