= 3-hydroxyacyl-CoA dehydratase 3 =

Enzyme found in humans

HACD3

Identifiers
- Aliases: HACD3, B-IND1, BIND1, HSPC121, PTPLAD1, 3-hydroxyacyl-CoA dehydratase 3
- External IDs: OMIM: 615940; MGI: 1889341; GeneCards: HACD3
Enzyme activity
EC #	BRENDA	ExPASy	KEGG	MetaCyc
4.2.1.134	↗	↗	↗	↗

Gene location (Human)
Chr.	Chromosome 15 (human)
Band	15q22.31	Start	65,530,418 bp
Band	15q22.31	End	65,578,349 bp

Gene location (Mouse)
Chr.	Chromosome 9 (mouse)
Band	9|9 C	Start	64,894,265 bp
Band	9|9 C	End	64,928,975 bp
RNA expression pattern
Bgee	Human / Mouse (ortholog); Top expressed in: pons; pars compacta; retinal pigment epithelium; renal medulla; superior vestibular nucleus; pars reticulata; lateral nuclear group of thalamus; ventral tegmental area; middle temporal gyrus; inferior ganglion of vagus nerve / Top expressed in: Paneth cell; substantia nigra; facial motor nucleus; pineal gland; motor neuron; fossa; condyle; vestibular sensory epithelium; suprachiasmatic nucleus; pituitary gland; More reference expression data
BioGPS	n/a
Gene ontology
Molecular function	GTPase activator activity; protein binding; lyase activity; enzyme binding; 3-hydroxyacyl-CoA dehydratase activity; 3-hydroxy-lignoceroyl-CoA dehydratase activity; 3-hydroxy-behenoyl-CoA dehydratase activity; 3-hydroxy-arachidoyl-CoA dehydratase activity; very-long-chain 3-hydroxyacyl-CoA dehydratase activity
Cellular component	integral component of membrane; nuclear membrane; endoplasmic reticulum membrane; membrane; focal adhesion; endoplasmic reticulum; mitochondrion; cytosol; integral component of endoplasmic reticulum membrane
Biological process	positive regulation by virus of viral protein levels in host cell; lipid metabolism; small GTPase mediated signal transduction; fatty acid metabolic process; JNK cascade; fatty acid biosynthetic process; very long-chain fatty acid biosynthetic process; Rho protein signal transduction; fatty acid elongation; positive regulation of viral genome replication; Rac protein signal transduction; I-kappaB kinase/NF-kappaB signaling; positive regulation of GTPase activity; sphingolipid biosynthetic process
Sources:Amigo / QuickGO
Orthologs
Databases	NCBI: entry; OMA: entry
Species	Human	Mouse
Entrez	51495	57874
Ensembl	ENSG00000074696	ENSMUSG00000033629
UniProt	Q9P035	Q8K2C9
RefSeq (mRNA)	NM_016395	NM_021345
RefSeq (protein)	NP_057479	NP_067320
Location (UCSC)	Chr 15: 65.53 – 65.58 Mb	Chr 9: 64.89 – 64.93 Mb
PubMed search
- Wikidata
View/Edit Human	View/Edit Mouse

3-hydroxyacyl-CoA dehydratase 3 is an enzyme that in humans is encoded by the HACD3 gene (previously PTPLAD1). This enzyme is a very-long-chain (3R)-3-hydroxyacyl-CoA dehydratase (EC 4.2.1.134) which is involved in fatty acid synthesis.
