= MFAP1 =

Protein-coding gene in the species Homo sapiens

Identifiers
- Aliases: MFAP1, microfibrillar associated protein 1, microfibril associated protein 1, AMP
- External IDs: OMIM: 600215; MGI: 1914782; GeneCards: MFAP1

Gene location (Human)
Chr.	Chromosome 15 (human)
Band	15q15.3	Start	43,804,492 bp
Band	15q15.3	End	43,824,690 bp

Gene location (Mouse)
Chr.	Chromosome 2 (mouse)
Band	2|2 E5	Start	121,322,392 bp
Band	2|2 E5	End	121,337,146 bp
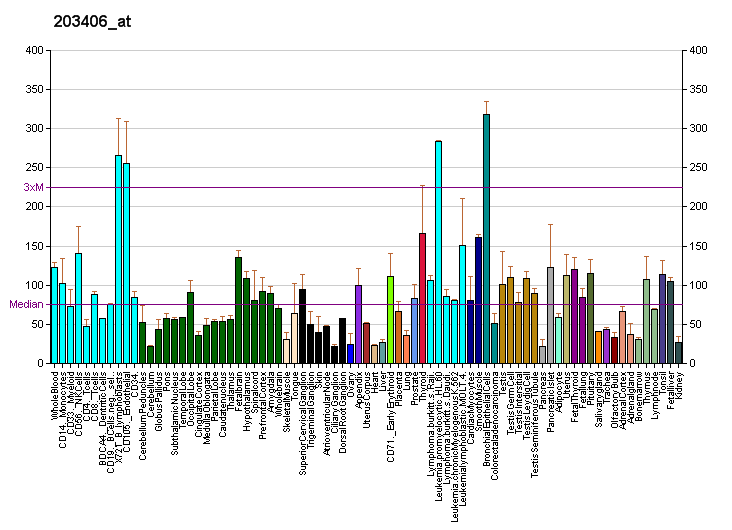
RNA expression pattern
Bgee	Human / Mouse (ortholog); Top expressed in: secondary oocyte; hair follicle; gonad; ventricular zone; cartilage tissue; epithelium of nasopharynx; amniotic fluid; germinal epithelium; Achilles tendon; right adrenal gland / Top expressed in: Rostral migratory stream; retinal pigment epithelium; ciliary body; vas deferens; human fetus; efferent ductule; iris; epithelium of lens; hand; lobe of prostate; More reference expression data
BioGPS	More reference expression data
Gene ontology
Molecular function	protein binding; RNA binding
Cellular component	microfibril; extracellular region; nucleus; spliceosomal complex; U2-type precatalytic spliceosome
Biological process	biological process; mRNA splicing, via spliceosome; mRNA processing; RNA splicing
Sources:Amigo / QuickGO
Orthologs
Databases	NCBI: entry; OMA: entry
Species	Human	Mouse
Entrez	4236	67532
Ensembl	ENSG00000140259	ENSMUSG00000068479
UniProt	P55081	C0HKD8; C0HKD9
RefSeq (mRNA)	NM_005926	NM_026220
RefSeq (protein)	NP_005917	NP_001075444; NP_080496
Location (UCSC)	Chr 15: 43.8 – 43.82 Mb	Chr 2: 121.32 – 121.34 Mb
PubMed search
- Wikidata
View/Edit Human	View/Edit Mouse

Microfibrillar-associated protein 1 is a protein that in humans is encoded by the MFAP1 gene.
