= ARPP-19 =

Protein-coding gene in the species Homo sapiens

ARPP19

Identifiers
- Aliases: ARPP19, ARPP-16, ARPP-19, ARPP16, ENSAL, cAMP regulated phosphoprotein 19kDa, cAMP regulated phosphoprotein 19
- External IDs: OMIM: 605487; MGI: 1891691; HomoloGene: 21318; GeneCards: ARPP19; OMA:ARPP19 - orthologs

Gene location (Human)
Chr.	Chromosome 15 (human)
Band	15q21.2	Start	52,547,045 bp
Band	15q21.2	End	52,569,883 bp

Gene location (Mouse)
Chr.	Chromosome 9 (mouse)
Band	9|9 D	Start	75,037,614 bp
Band	9|9 D	End	75,060,313 bp
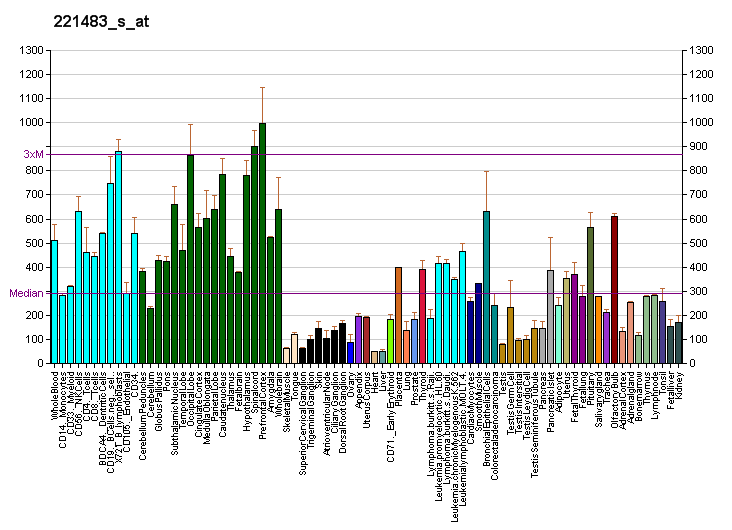

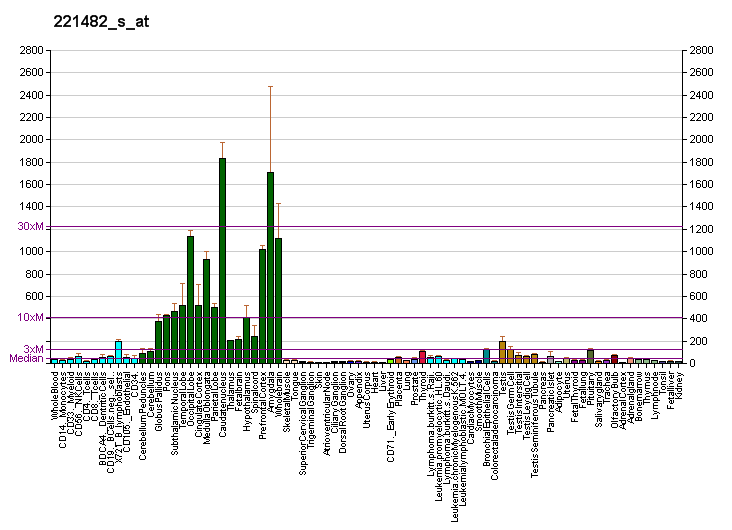

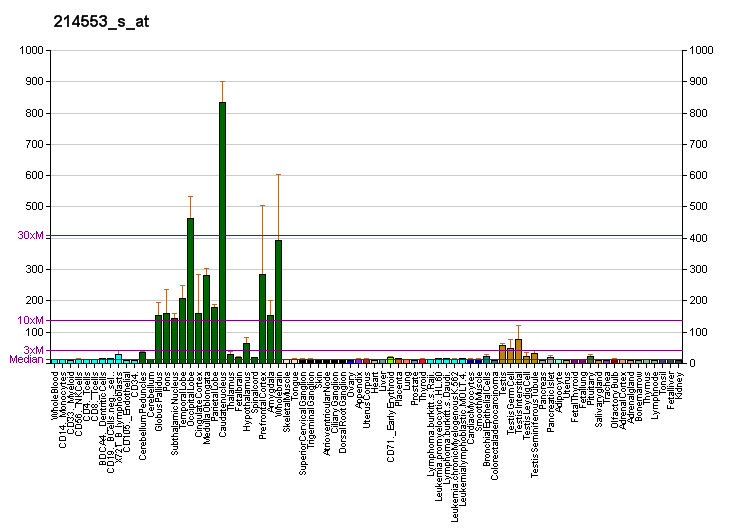
RNA expression pattern
Bgee	Human / Mouse (ortholog); Top expressed in: prefrontal cortex; external globus pallidus; nucleus accumbens; putamen; caudate nucleus; optic nerve; middle frontal gyrus; Brodmann area 10; dorsolateral prefrontal cortex; Brodmann area 9 / Top expressed in: superior frontal gyrus; olfactory tubercle; yolk sac; globus pallidus; primary motor cortex; nucleus accumbens; prefrontal cortex; primary visual cortex; right kidney; embryo; More reference expression data
BioGPS	More reference expression data
Gene ontology
Molecular function	protein phosphatase 2A binding; potassium channel regulator activity; signaling receptor binding; phosphatase inhibitor activity; protein phosphatase inhibitor activity; protein phosphatase regulator activity
Cellular component	nucleoplasm; cytoplasm
Biological process	cell division; positive regulation of glucose import; cell cycle; positive regulation of gluconeogenesis; G2/M transition of mitotic cell cycle; negative regulation of catalytic activity; negative regulation of protein dephosphorylation; mitotic cell cycle; negative regulation of phosphoprotein phosphatase activity; regulation of phosphoprotein phosphatase activity
Sources:Amigo / QuickGO
Orthologs
Species	Human	Mouse
Entrez	10776	59046
Ensembl	ENSG00000128989	ENSMUSG00000007656
UniProt	P56211	P56212
RefSeq (mRNA)	NM_001306191; NM_001306195; NM_001306196; NM_006628; NM_001330309	NM_001142655; NM_021548
RefSeq (protein)	NP_001293120; NP_001293124; NP_001293125; NP_001317238; NP_006619	NP_001136127; NP_067523; NP_001344807; NP_001344808; NP_001344809 NP_001344810
Location (UCSC)	Chr 15: 52.55 – 52.57 Mb	Chr 9: 75.04 – 75.06 Mb
PubMed search
- Wikidata
View/Edit Human	View/Edit Mouse

cAMP-regulated phosphoprotein 19 is a protein that in humans is encoded by the ARPP19 gene.
