= SCAPER =

Protein-coding gene in the species Homo sapiens

Identifiers
- Aliases: SCAPER, ZNF291, Zfp291, MSTP063, S-phase cyclin A associated protein in the ER, IDDRP
- External IDs: OMIM: 611611; MGI: 1925976; GeneCards: SCAPER

Gene location (Human)
Chr.	Chromosome 15 (human)
Band	15q24.3	Start	76,347,904 bp
Band	15q24.3	End	76,905,444 bp

Gene location (Mouse)
Chr.	Chromosome 9 (mouse)
Band	9|9 B	Start	55,457,163 bp
Band	9|9 B	End	55,845,403 bp
RNA expression pattern
Bgee	Human / Mouse (ortholog); Top expressed in: testicle; sural nerve; gonad; Achilles tendon; buccal mucosa cell; ganglionic eminence; epithelium of colon; ventricular zone; C1 segment; tibial arteries / Top expressed in: arcuate nucleus; zygote; otolith organ; utricle; Rostral migratory stream; median eminence; secondary oocyte; paraventricular nucleus of hypothalamus; piriform cortex; ventromedial nucleus; More reference expression data
BioGPS	n/a
Orthologs
Databases	NCBI: entry; OMA: entry
Species	Human	Mouse
Entrez	49855	244891
Ensembl	ENSG00000140386	244891
UniProt	Q9BY12	n/a
RefSeq (mRNA)	NM_001145923; NM_020843; NM_001353009; NM_001353010; NM_001353011 NM_001353012	NM_001081341; NM_175536; NM_001357652; NM_001357653
RefSeq (protein)	NP_001139395; NP_065894; NP_001339938; NP_001339939; NP_001339940 NP_001339941	n/a
Location (UCSC)	Chr 15: 76.35 – 76.91 Mb	Chr 9: 55.46 – 55.85 Mb
PubMed search
- Wikidata
View/Edit Human	View/Edit Mouse

SCAPER (S-phase CyclinA Associated Protein residing in the Endoplasmic Reticulum) is a gene located on the long arm of chromosome 15 (15q24.3). It was first identified in 2007.

== Gene ==
This gene lies on the Crick strand and has 30 exons.

== Protein ==
The gene encodes a 1399-amino acid protein with a predicted weight of 158 kilodaltons. It has a C2H2-type zinc finger motif, a putative transmembrane domain, an ER retrieval signal at the C terminus, 4 coiled-coil domains, 6 potential RXL motifs and 6 consensus Cdk phosphorylation sites.

== Biochemistry ==
The encoded protein is found in the nucleus and endoplasmic reticulum.

It is found in all tissues tested. It appears to have a role in the cell cycle.

== Clinical significance ==
Mutations in this gene have been associated with intellectual disability and retinitis pigmentosa.
