= ELL3 =

Protein-coding gene in the species Homo sapiens

Identifiers
- Aliases: ELL3, ELL3 (gene), elongation factor for RNA polymerase II 3
- External IDs: OMIM: 609885; MGI: 2673679; GeneCards: ELL3

Gene location (Human)
Chr.	Chromosome 15 (human)
Band	15q15.3	Start	43,772,605 bp
Band	15q15.3	End	43,777,315 bp

Gene location (Mouse)
Chr.	Chromosome 2 (mouse)
Band	2|2 E5	Start	121,269,491 bp
Band	2|2 E5	End	121,274,759 bp
RNA expression pattern
Bgee	Human / Mouse (ortholog); Top expressed in: duodenum; lymph node; zone of skin; skin of abdomen; skin of leg; mucosa of transverse colon; left testis; right testis; rectum; testicle / Top expressed in: spleen; morula; proximal tubule; epiblast; primary oocyte; embryo; right kidney; human kidney; blastocyst; zone of skin; More reference expression data
BioGPS	n/a
Gene ontology
Molecular function	protein binding
Cellular component	nucleolus; transcription elongation factor complex; nucleus; nucleoplasm
Biological process	positive regulation of DNA-templated transcription, elongation; positive regulation of neurogenesis; positive regulation of neural precursor cell proliferation; transcription elongation from RNA polymerase II promoter; regulation of epithelial to mesenchymal transition; DNA-templated transcription, elongation; regulation of transcription, DNA-templated; negative regulation of intrinsic apoptotic signaling pathway in response to DNA damage by p53 class mediator; transcription by RNA polymerase II; spermatogenesis; positive regulation of transcription by RNA polymerase II; stem cell differentiation; transcription, DNA-templated; negative regulation of signal transduction by p53 class mediator; snRNA transcription by RNA polymerase II
Sources:Amigo / QuickGO
Orthologs
Databases	NCBI: entry; OMA: entry
Species	Human	Mouse
Entrez	80237	269344
Ensembl	ENSG00000128886	ENSMUSG00000027246
UniProt	Q9HB65	Q80VR2
RefSeq (mRNA)	NM_025165	NM_145973
RefSeq (protein)	NP_079441	NP_666085
Location (UCSC)	Chr 15: 43.77 – 43.78 Mb	Chr 2: 121.27 – 121.27 Mb
PubMed search
- Wikidata
View/Edit Human	View/Edit Mouse

Elongation factor RNA polymerase II-like 3 is a protein that in humans is encoded by the ELL3 gene.
