= PIGB opposite strand 1 =

Protein-coding gene in the species Homo sapiens

PIGBOS1

Identifiers
- Aliases: PIGBOS1, HP06981, PIGB opposite strand 1
- External IDs: MGI: 1913614; GeneCards: PIGBOS1; OMA:PIGBOS1 - orthologs

Gene location (Human)
Chr.	Chromosome 15 (human)
Band	15q21.3	Start	55,317,184 bp
Band	15q21.3	End	55,319,161 bp

Gene location (Mouse)
Chr.	Chromosome 9 (mouse)
Band	9|9 D	Start	72,947,000 bp
Band	9|9 D	End	72,950,061 bp
RNA expression pattern
Bgee	Human / Mouse (ortholog); Top expressed in: monocyte; Achilles tendon; testicle; granulocyte; gonad; placenta; Descending thoracic aorta; islet of Langerhans; left lobe of thyroid gland; right lobe of thyroid gland / Top expressed in: interventricular septum; right kidney; granulocyte; neural tube; intercostal muscle; proximal tubule; hand; stomach; brown adipose tissue; endocardial cushion; More reference expression data
BioGPS	n/a
Orthologs
Species	Human	Mouse
Entrez	101928527	66364
Ensembl	ENSG00000225973	ENSMUSG00000098332
UniProt	A0A0B4J2F0	A0A5F8MPY0
RefSeq (mRNA)	NM_001308421; NM_001308422; NM_001308423	NM_001308425
RefSeq (protein)	NP_001295350; NP_001295351; NP_001295352	NP_001295354
Location (UCSC)	Chr 15: 55.32 – 55.32 Mb	Chr 9: 72.95 – 72.95 Mb
PubMed search
- Wikidata
View/Edit Human	View/Edit Mouse

PIGB opposite strand 1 is a protein that in humans is encoded by the PIGBOS1 gene.
