= Forkhead box B1 =

Protein-coding gene in the species Homo sapiens

FOXB1

Identifiers
- Aliases: FOXB1, FKH5, HFKH-5, forkhead box B1
- External IDs: OMIM: 619961; MGI: 1927549; GeneCards: FOXB1

Gene location (Human)
Chr.	Chromosome 15 (human)
Band	15q22.2	Start	60,004,234 bp
Band	15q22.2	End	60,061,730 bp

Gene location (Mouse)
Chr.	Chromosome 9 (mouse)
Band	9 D|9 38.76 cM	Start	69,664,992 bp
Band	9 D|9 38.76 cM	End	69,668,222 bp
RNA expression pattern
Bgee	Human / Mouse (ortholog); Top expressed in: hypothalamus; substantia nigra; gonad; C1 segment; left testis; right testis; placenta; right uterine tube; lymph node; endometrium / Top expressed in: tail of embryo; neural plate; lumbar subsegment of spinal cord; embryo; mammillary body; embryo; mesoderm; neural groove; tibiofemoral joint; somite; More reference expression data
BioGPS	n/a
Gene ontology
Molecular function	DNA binding; DNA-binding transcription factor activity; protein binding; sequence-specific DNA binding; DNA-binding transcription factor activity, RNA polymerase II-specific
Cellular component	nucleus
Biological process	visual learning; somitogenesis; negative regulation of neuron apoptotic process; mammillary body development; mammillothalamic axonal tract development; regulation of transcription, DNA-templated; axon target recognition; mammary gland lobule development; thalamus development; transcription, DNA-templated; floor plate development; telencephalon cell migration; cell migration in diencephalon; inferior colliculus development; spinal cord development; urogenital system development; lactation; midbrain development; epithelial cell differentiation involved in mammary gland alveolus development; hypothalamus cell migration; regulation of transcription by RNA polymerase II; anatomical structure morphogenesis; cell differentiation
Sources:Amigo / QuickGO
Orthologs
Databases	NCBI: entry; OMA: entry
Species	Human	Mouse
Entrez	27023	64290
Ensembl	ENSG00000171956	ENSMUSG00000059246
UniProt	Q99853	Q64732
RefSeq (mRNA)	NM_012182	NM_022378
RefSeq (protein)	NP_036314	NP_071773
Location (UCSC)	Chr 15: 60 – 60.06 Mb	Chr 9: 69.66 – 69.67 Mb
PubMed search
- Wikidata
View/Edit Human	View/Edit Mouse

Forkhead box B1 is a protein that in humans is encoded by the FOXB1 gene.
