= Transmembrane 6 superfamily member 1 =

Protein-coding gene in the species Homo sapiens

TM6SF1

Identifiers
- Aliases: TM6SF1, transmembrane 6 superfamily member 1
- External IDs: OMIM: 606562; MGI: 1933209; HomoloGene: 11305; GeneCards: TM6SF1; OMA:TM6SF1 - orthologs

Gene location (Human)
Chr.	Chromosome 15 (human)
Band	15q25.2	Start	83,107,572 bp
Band	15q25.2	End	83,144,854 bp

Gene location (Mouse)
Chr.	Chromosome 7 (mouse)
Band	7|7 D3	Start	81,508,749 bp
Band	7|7 D3	End	81,534,182 bp
RNA expression pattern
Bgee	Human / Mouse (ortholog); Top expressed in: monocyte; muscle of thigh; thoracic diaphragm; Skeletal muscle tissue of rectus abdominis; gastrocnemius muscle; biceps brachii; blood; vastus lateralis muscle; prefrontal cortex; Skeletal muscle tissue of biceps brachii / Top expressed in: granulocyte; stroma of bone marrow; soleus muscle; human fetus; spleen; sternocleidomastoid muscle; blood; dermis; thymus; temporal muscle; More reference expression data
BioGPS	n/a
Gene ontology
Molecular function	molecular function; protein binding
Cellular component	lysosome; membrane; integral component of membrane; lysosomal membrane
Biological process	biological process
Sources:Amigo / QuickGO
Orthologs
Species	Human	Mouse
Entrez	53346	107769
Ensembl	ENSG00000136404	ENSMUSG00000038623
UniProt	Q9BZW5; Q8N5N8	P58749
RefSeq (mRNA)	NM_001144903; NM_023003; NM_001330385; NM_001353878; NM_001353879 NM_001353880; NM_001353881; NM_001353882; NM_001353883; NM_001353884	NM_001291282; NM_145375
RefSeq (protein)	NP_001138375; NP_001317314; NP_075379; NP_001340807; NP_001340808 NP_001340809; NP_001340810; NP_001340811; NP_001340812; NP_001340813	NP_001278211; NP_663350
Location (UCSC)	Chr 15: 83.11 – 83.14 Mb	Chr 7: 81.51 – 81.53 Mb
PubMed search
- Wikidata
View/Edit Human	View/Edit Mouse

Transmembrane 6 superfamily member 1 is a protein that in humans is encoded by the TM6SF1 gene.
