= Snurportin-1 =

Protein found in humans

SNUPN
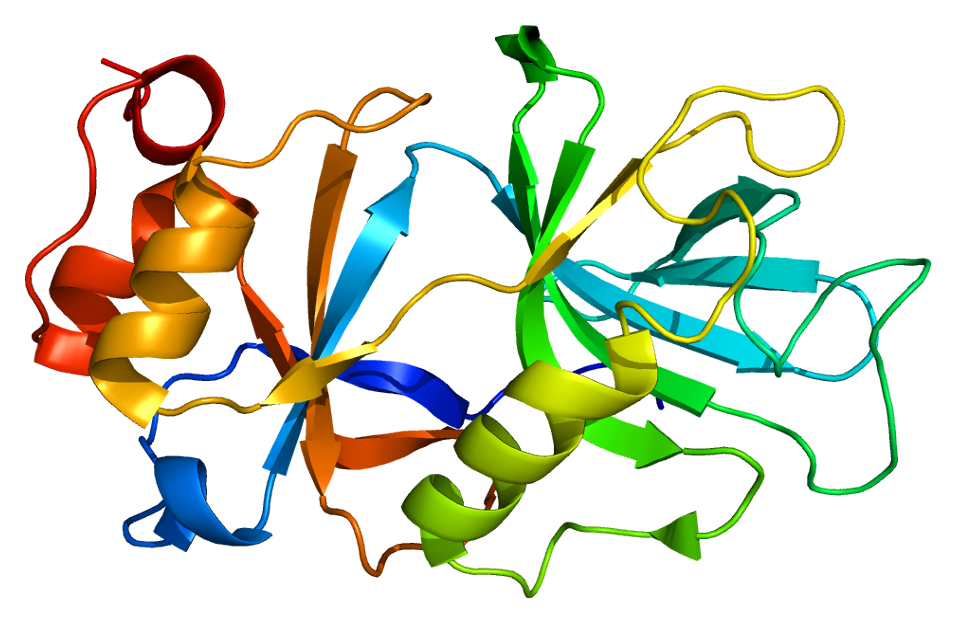

Identifiers
- Aliases: SNUPN, KPNBL, RNUT1, Snurportin1, snurportin 1
- External IDs: OMIM: 607902; MGI: 1913319; GeneCards: SNUPN
Available structures
PDB	Ortholog search: PDBe RCSB
PDB	List of PDB id codes 1XK5, 2P8Q, 2Q5D, 2QNA, 3GB8, 3GJX, 3LWW, 3NBY, 3NBZ, 3NC0

Gene location (Human)
Chr.	Chromosome 15 (human)
Band	15q24.2	Start	75,598,083 bp
Band	15q24.2	End	75,626,469 bp

Gene location (Mouse)
Chr.	Chromosome 9 (mouse)
Band	9|9 B	Start	56,858,162 bp
Band	9|9 B	End	56,890,490 bp
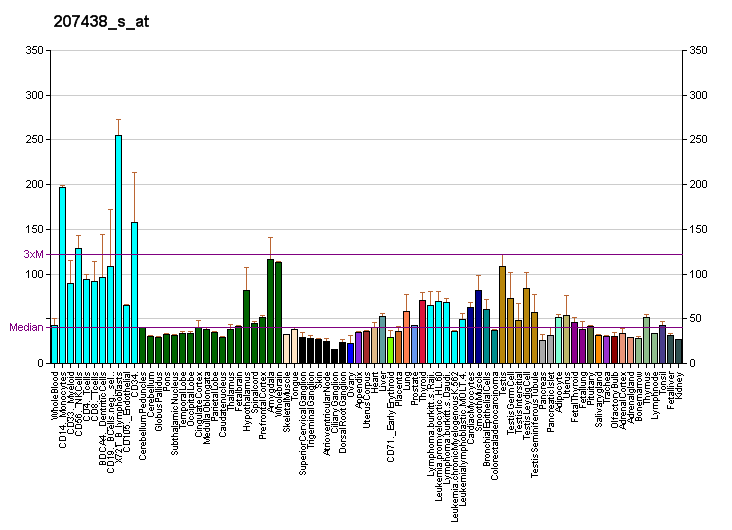
RNA expression pattern
Bgee	Human / Mouse (ortholog); Top expressed in: left testis; right testis; smooth muscle tissue; skeletal muscle tissue; muscle of thigh; gonad; gastrocnemius muscle; right ovary; left ovary; fallopian tube / Top expressed in: otolith organ; utricle; primary oocyte; zygote; superior cervical ganglion; hand; morula; interventricular septum; secondary oocyte; seminiferous tubule; More reference expression data
BioGPS	More reference expression data
Gene ontology
Molecular function	RNA cap binding; RNA binding; protein binding; nuclear import signal receptor activity
Cellular component	cytoplasm; cytosol; nuclear pore; nucleus; intracellular anatomical structure
Biological process	snRNA import into nucleus; protein import into nucleus; spliceosomal snRNP assembly; import into nucleus
Sources:Amigo / QuickGO
Orthologs
Databases	NCBI: entry; OMA: entry
Species	Human	Mouse
Entrez	10073	66069
Ensembl	ENSG00000169371	ENSMUSG00000055334
UniProt	O95149	Q80W37
RefSeq (mRNA)	NM_005701; NM_001042581; NM_001042588	NM_178374
RefSeq (protein)	NP_001036046; NP_001036053; NP_005692	NP_848461
Location (UCSC)	Chr 15: 75.6 – 75.63 Mb	Chr 9: 56.86 – 56.89 Mb
PubMed search
- Wikidata
View/Edit Human	View/Edit Mouse

Snurportin-1 is a protein that in humans is encoded by the SNUPN gene (also written SPN1).

The nuclear import of the spliceosomal snRNPs U1, U2, U4 and U5 is dependent on the presence of a complex nuclear localization signal. The latter is composed of the 5'-2,2,7-terminal trimethylguanosine (m3G) cap structure of the U snRNA and the Sm core domain. The protein encoded by this gene interacts specifically with m3G-cap and functions as an snRNP-specific nuclear import receptor. Alternatively spliced transcript variants encoding the same protein have been identified for this gene.
