= TMC3 =

Protein-coding gene in the species Homo sapiens

Identifiers
- Aliases: TMC3, transmembrane channel like 3
- External IDs: OMIM: 617196; MGI: 2669033; GeneCards: TMC3

Gene location (Human)
Chr.	Chromosome 15 (human)
Band	15q25.1	Start	81,331,088 bp
Band	15q25.1	End	81,374,213 bp

Gene location (Mouse)
Chr.	Chromosome 7 (mouse)
Band	7|7 D3	Start	83,234,135 bp
Band	7|7 D3	End	83,274,822 bp
RNA expression pattern
Bgee	Human / Mouse (ortholog); Top expressed in: testicle; right uterine tube; right lobe of liver; muscle layer of sigmoid colon; duodenum; placenta; prefrontal cortex; primary visual cortex; gonad; olfactory zone of nasal mucosa / Top expressed in: embryo; basilar part of occipital bone; secondary oocyte; petrous part of the temporal bone; bone marrow; ganglionic eminence; sphenoid bone; zygote; primary oocyte; zone of skin; More reference expression data
BioGPS	n/a
Gene ontology
Molecular function	ion channel activity; mechanosensitive ion channel activity
Cellular component	membrane; integral component of membrane; integral component of plasma membrane
Biological process	ion transport; ion transmembrane transport; transmembrane transport
Sources:Amigo / QuickGO
Orthologs
Databases	NCBI: entry; OMA: entry
Species	Human	Mouse
Entrez	342125	233424
Ensembl	ENSG00000188869	ENSMUSG00000038540
UniProt	Q7Z5M5	Q7TQ69
RefSeq (mRNA)	NM_001080532; NM_181841	NM_177695
RefSeq (protein)	NP_001074001	NP_808363
Location (UCSC)	Chr 15: 81.33 – 81.37 Mb	Chr 7: 83.23 – 83.27 Mb
PubMed search
- Wikidata
View/Edit Human	View/Edit Mouse

Transmembrane channel like 3 is a protein that in humans is encoded by the TMC3 gene.
