= Cugbp elav-like family member 6 =

Protein-coding gene in the species Homo sapiens

CELF6

Identifiers
- Aliases: CELF6, BRUNOL6, CUGBP, Elav-like family member 6, CUGBP Elav-like family member 6
- External IDs: OMIM: 612681; GeneCards: CELF6
Available structures
PDB	Human UniProt search: PDBe RCSB
PDB	List of PDB id codes 2DGQ
RNA expression pattern
Bgee	Human / Mouse (ortholog); Top expressed in: right uterine tube; hypothalamus; pituitary gland; anterior pituitary; prefrontal cortex; superior frontal gyrus; sural nerve; Brodmann area 9; right lobe of thyroid gland; left lobe of thyroid gland / n/a; More reference expression data
BioGPS	n/a
Gene ontology
Molecular function	nucleic acid binding; RNA binding; mRNA binding
Cellular component	nucleus; cytoplasm; cytosol; ribonucleoprotein complex
Biological process	mRNA processing; regulation of alternative mRNA splicing, via spliceosome; mRNA splice site selection
Sources:Amigo / QuickGO
Orthologs
Databases	NCBI: entry
Species	Human	Mouse
Entrez	60677	n/a
Ensembl	n/a	n/a
UniProt	Q96J87	n/a
RefSeq (mRNA)	NM_052840; NM_001172684; NM_001172685	n/a
RefSeq (protein)	NP_001166155; NP_001166156; NP_443072	n/a
Location (UCSC)	n/a	n/a
PubMed search		n/a
- Wikidata
View/Edit Human

CUGBP Elav-like family member 6 is a protein that in humans is encoded by the CELF6 gene.

== Function ==
Members of the CELF/BRUNOL protein family contain two N-terminal RNA recognition motif (RRM) domains, one C-terminal RRM domain, and a divergent segment of 160-230 aa between the second and third RRM domains. Members of this protein family regulate pre-mRNA alternative splicing and may also be involved in mRNA editing, and translation. Multiple alternatively spliced transcript variants encoding different isoforms have been identified in this gene. [provided by RefSeq, Feb 2010].
