= PYGO1 =

Protein-coding gene in the species Homo sapiens

Identifiers
- Aliases: PYGO1, pygopus family PHD finger 1
- External IDs: OMIM: 606902; MGI: 1919385; GeneCards: PYGO1
Available structures
PDB	Ortholog search: PDBe RCSB
PDB	List of PDB id codes 2VP7, 2VPB, 2VPD, 2VPE, 2VPG

Gene location (Mouse)
Chr.	Chromosome 9 (mouse)
Band	9|9 D	Start	72,832,927 bp
Band	9|9 D	End	72,859,463 bp
RNA expression pattern
Bgee	Human / Mouse (ortholog); Top expressed in: ganglionic eminence; gastrocnemius muscle; biceps brachii; Achilles tendon; stromal cell of endometrium; smooth muscle tissue; cerebellar cortex; cerebellar hemisphere; quadriceps femoris muscle; vastus lateralis muscle / Top expressed in: dentate gyrus of hippocampal formation granule cell; genital tubercle; lumbar subsegment of spinal cord; olfactory epithelium; muscle of thigh; ventricular zone; urethra; male urethra; zygote; primary visual cortex; More reference expression data
BioGPS	n/a
Gene ontology
Molecular function	protein binding; metal ion binding; methylated histone binding
Cellular component	nucleus; nucleoplasm
Biological process	protein localization to nucleus; spermatid nucleus differentiation; post-embryonic development; Wnt signaling pathway; hematopoietic progenitor cell differentiation; positive regulation of transcription by RNA polymerase II; kidney development; spermatid development; beta-catenin-TCF complex assembly; canonical Wnt signaling pathway
Sources:Amigo / QuickGO
Orthologs
Databases	NCBI: entry
Species	Human	Mouse
Entrez	26108	72135
Ensembl	n/a	ENSMUSG00000034910
UniProt	Q9Y3Y4	Q9D0P5
RefSeq (mRNA)	NM_015617; NM_001330326; NM_001367806	NM_028116
RefSeq (protein)	NP_001317255; NP_056432; NP_001354735	NP_082392
Location (UCSC)	n/a	Chr 9: 72.83 – 72.86 Mb
PubMed search
- Wikidata
View/Edit Human	View/Edit Mouse

Pygopus homolog 1 (Drosophila) is a protein in humans that is encoded by the PYGO1 gene.
