= Glaucoma 1, open angle, I =

GLC1I

Identifiers
- Aliases: GLC1I, glaucoma 1, open angle, I
- External IDs: GeneCards: GLC1I; OMA:GLC1I - orthologs
Orthologs
Species	Human	Mouse
Entrez	497188	n/a
Ensembl	n/a	n/a
UniProt	n a	n/a
RefSeq (mRNA)	n/a	n/a
RefSeq (protein)	n/a	n/a
Location (UCSC)	n/a	n/a
PubMed search		n/a
- Wikidata
View/Edit Human

Glaucoma 1, open angle, I is a protein that in humans is encoded by the GLC1I gene.
