= Schizophrenia disorder 10 (periodic catatonia) =

Genetic element in the species Homo sapiens

SCZD10

Identifiers
- Aliases: SCZD10, schizophrenia disorder 10 (periodic catatonia), Schizophrenia disorder 10
- External IDs: GeneCards: SCZD10; OMA:SCZD10 - orthologs
Orthologs
Species	Human	Mouse
Entrez	63944	n/a
Ensembl	n/a	n/a
UniProt	n a	n/a
RefSeq (mRNA)	n/a	n/a
RefSeq (protein)	n/a	n/a
Location (UCSC)	n/a	n/a
PubMed search		n/a
- Wikidata
View/Edit Human

Schizophrenia disorder 10 (periodic catatonia) is a protein that in humans is encoded by the SCZD10 gene.
