= B2MR =

Beta-2-microglobulin regulator is a protein in humans that is encoded by the B2MR gene.
