= Insulin dependent diabetes mellitus 3 =

Protein found in humans

IDDM3

Identifiers
- Aliases: IDDM3, insulin dependent diabetes mellitus 3
- External IDs: GeneCards: IDDM3; OMA:IDDM3 - orthologs
Orthologs
Species	Human	Mouse
Entrez	3402	n/a
Ensembl	n/a	n/a
UniProt	n a	n/a
RefSeq (mRNA)	n/a	n/a
RefSeq (protein)	n/a	n/a
Location (UCSC)	n/a	n/a
PubMed search		n/a
- Wikidata
View/Edit Human

Insulin dependent diabetes mellitus 3 is a protein that in humans is encoded by the IDDM3 gene.
