= List of intestinal stem cell marker genes =

The following is a list of intestinal stem cell marker genes, including their name and known function.

== Intestinal stem cells ==
In the adult intestine, the crypts of Lieberkühn are the niche for epithelial stem cells and contain all proliferative stem and progenitor cells. Differentiating cells exit the cell cycle and migrate out of the crypts and onto the surface epithelium of the intestine, where they perform their physiological role (e.g., nutrient absorption by enterocytes; mucous secretion by goblet cells) and are eventually shed into the lumen. Intestinal stem cells were first identified as such in the 1970s. Cheng and Leblond used autoradiography of phagosomes to track the fate of cells at the base of the crypts, and determined that slender cells interspersed among Paneth cells at the crypt base could give rise to all of the other cell types that constituted the intestinal epithelium. Due to their narrow shape and location, these cells were called crypt base columnar cells (CBCs). Potten and colleagues used a combination of DNA labeling and assessment of the response of the epithelium to high-dose radiation to identify label-retaining cells (LRCs) as putative stem cells, which were typically located around four cell positions above the bottom of the crypt, and were therefore also called "+4 cells". Later work suggested that these "+4 cells" may function as reserve or back-up stem cells, and further suggested that they divide slowly relative to the other progenitor cells in the crypt. Thus, these cells are also called quiescent stem cells.

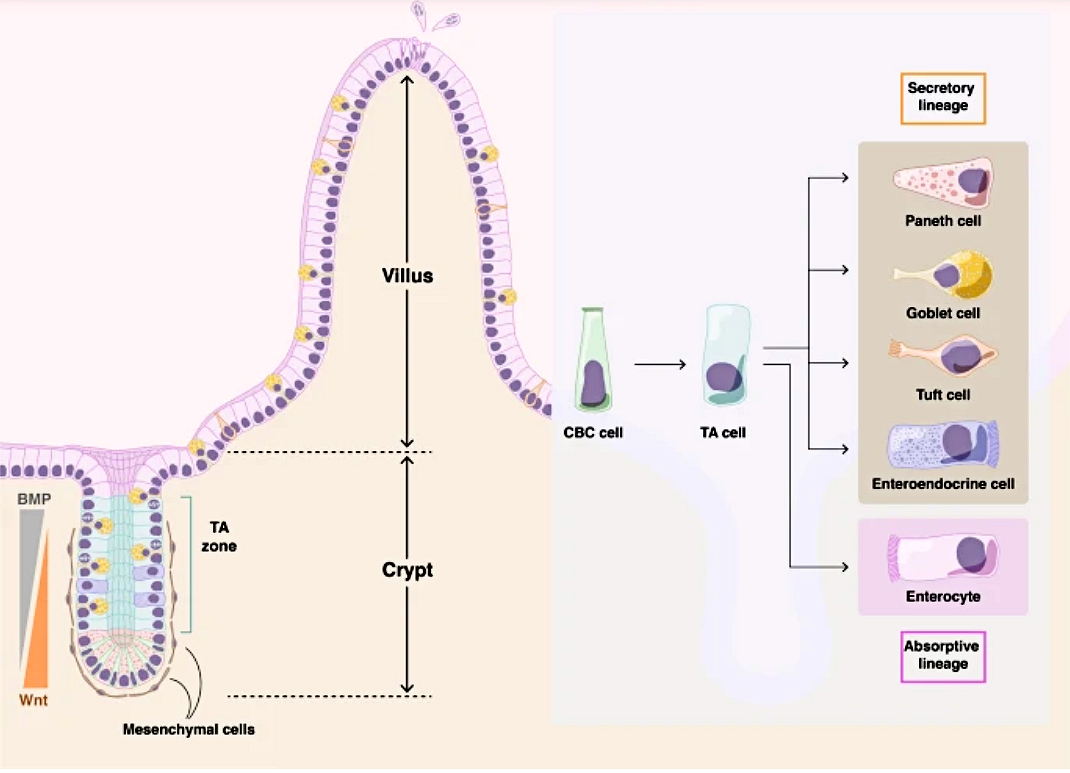
Diagram of the intestinal crypt-villus structure.

The stem cell zone model states that the CBC stem cells reside in a stem-cell-permissive environment. These cycling stem cells regularly generate progeny, which subsequently exit the niche and pass through the “common origin of differentiation” around position +5, where they commit toward the various individual lineages. CBC intestinal stem cells divide about once every day, and produce intermediate progenitors (transient amplifying or "TA" cells) that divide even faster before terminally differentiating and exiting the cell cycle. Several intercellular signaling pathways and transcriptional programs regulate differentiation of the various cell types that constitute the mature epithelium, that include enterocytes, BEST4+ enterocytes, microfold or "M" cells, goblet cells, enteroendocrine cells, tuft cells, and Paneth cells. Progenitors mature as they migrate upward onto the villus. Maturing Paneth cell progenitors migrate downward, with the oldest Paneth cells residing at the very base of the crypt. In accordance with the stem cell zone model proposing that, during their upward migration, CBC stem cells would only gradually lose their self-renewal capacity, it was shown in vivo that transient amplifying cells can revert to Lgr5+ CBC stem cells after damage, presumably by direct contact with Paneth cells.

== Molecular markers of intestinal stem cells ==
More recently modern genetics techniques, primarily using transgenic mice, have been used to identify genes that are specifically expressed or highly enriched in the intestinal stem cells. With the advent of organoid technology, stem cells have also been defined by their ability to grow into organoids and differentiate into the mature epithelial cell types described above. Below, a table of intestinal stem cell "marker" genes is given, along with a notation if this marks active of CBC stem cells, or quiescent/reserve/+4 stem cells.

Gene Name	Aliases	Name	Functional Description	Active vs. Quiescent	Reference (PMID)
ALCAM	CD166, MEMD	activated leukocyte cell adhesion molecule	transmembrane glycoprotein	Active	20826154
ASCL2	ASH2, HASH2, MASH2, bHLHa45	achaete-scute family bHLH transcription factor 2	basic helix loop helix transcription factor	Active	19269367
BMI1	RP11-573G6.1, FLVI2/BMI1, PCGF4, RNF51	polycomb ring finger oncogene	polycomb transcription repressor complex	Quiescent	18536716 22190486 21927002
DCLK1	RP11-113P14.1, CL1, CLICK1, DCAMKL1, DCDC3A, DCLK	Doublecortin and CaM kinase-like-1	microtubule-associated protein kinase	Quiescent?	16464855 18055444 24487592
CD24	CD24A, HSA	Cluster of Differentiation 24	sialoglycoprotein, cell adhesion molecule	Active	21183658 2355902
EPHB2	CAPB, DRT, EK5, EPHT3, ERK, Hek5, PCBC, Tyro5	Ephrin type-B receptor 2	ephrin receptor	Active	21419747
HOPX	CAMEO, HOD, HOP, LAGY, NECC1, OB1, SMAP31, TOTO	Homeodomain-only protein	atypical homeobox protein	Quiescent	22075725
Igfbp4	BP-4, HT29-IGFBP, IBP4, IGFBP-4	insulin-like growth factor binding protein 4	Inhibitor of the Igf pathway	Active	21419747
Itgb1	RP11-479G22.2, CD29, FNRB, GPIIA, MDF2, MSK12, VLA-BETA, VLAB	β1 integrin	fibronectin receptor beta	Active	16285956
LGR5	FEX, GPR49, GPR67, GRP49, HG38	Luciene-rich repeat containing G-protein-coupled receptor	R-spondin receptor	Active	17934449 22473993
Lrig1	LIG-1, LIG1	Leucine-rich repeats and immunoglobulin-like domains protein 1	ErbB inhibitor	Active, Quiescent	22464327 22388892
mTert	CMM9, DKCA2, DKCB4, EST2, PFBMFT1, TCS1, TP2, TRT, hEST2, hTRT	Mouse telomerase reverse transcriptase	enzymatic catalytic subunit of mouse telomerase	Quiescent	21173232
Musashi-1	MSI1	Musashi RNA-binding protein 1	translational repressor and regulator Notch signaling	Active	17122772
OLFM4	UNQ362/PRO698, GC1, GW112, OLM4, OlfD, UNQ362, bA209J19.1, hGC-1, hOLfD	Olfactomedin 4	glycoprotein	Active	19450592
PHLDA1	DT1P1B11, PHRIP, TDAG51	pleckstrin homology-like domain, family A, member 1	regulation of apoptosis	Active, Quiescent	21558389
Prom1	MSTP061, AC133, CD133, CORD12, MCDR2, PROML1, RP41, STGD4	Prominin1	glycoprotein	Active	19092805
PW1	PEG3, hCG_1685807, ZKSCAN22, ZNF904, ZSCAN24	Paternally expressed gene 3	unknown	Active	21709251
Smoc2	RP11-270C4__A.1, DTDP1, MST117, MSTP117, MSTP140, SMAP2, bA270C4A.1, bA37D8.1, dJ421D16.1	SPARC-related modular calcium-binding protein 2	BMP signaling inhibitor	Active	21419747 22692129
Sox9	CMD1, CMPD1, SRA1	SRY (sex determining region Y)-box 9	transcription factor	Active	19228882
TNFRSF19	UNQ1888/PRO4333, TAJ, TAJ-alpha, TRADE, TROY	tumor necrosis factor receptor family member	transmembrane receptor	Active	23142137

Additional possible markers: CD24 CD44v6 CD133 Active beta-catenin Pcdh8 21419747
