= Lieberkuhn =

Lieberkühn may refer to:

- Johann Nathanael Lieberkühn (1711 – 1756), a German physician, researcher and instrument maker
- a Lieberkühn reflector, an illumination device for a light microscope popularized by JN Lieberkühn, sometimes called just a Lieberkühn
