= HOXC10 =

Protein-coding gene in the species Homo sapiens

Identifiers
- Aliases: HOXC10, HOX3I, homeobox C10
- External IDs: OMIM: 605560; MGI: 96192; GeneCards: HOXC10

Gene location (Human)
Chr.	Chromosome 12 (human)
Band	12q13.13	Start	53,985,065 bp
Band	12q13.13	End	53,990,279 bp

Gene location (Mouse)
Chr.	Chromosome 15 (mouse)
Band	15 F3|15 58.03 cM	Start	102,875,231 bp
Band	15 F3|15 58.03 cM	End	102,880,328 bp
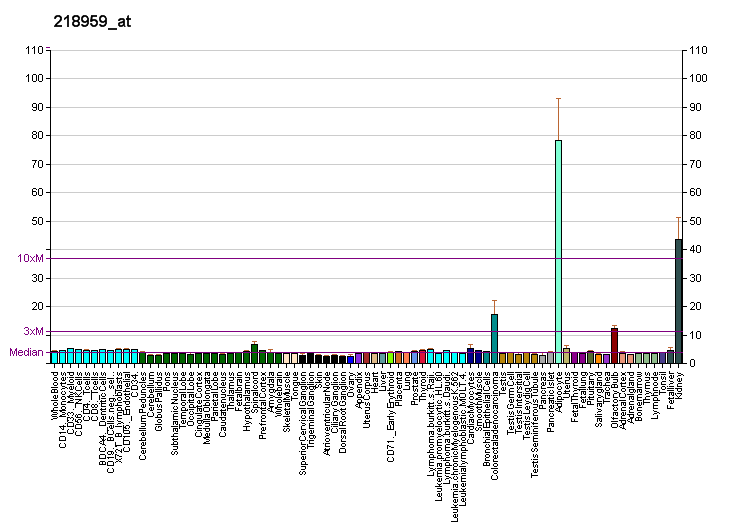
RNA expression pattern
Bgee	Human / Mouse (ortholog); Top expressed in: gastrocnemius muscle; buccal mucosa cell; renal medulla; popliteal artery; tibial arteries; tibialis anterior muscle; human kidney; quadriceps femoris muscle; vastus lateralis muscle; Achilles tendon / Top expressed in: tail of embryo; knee joint; muscle of thigh; medial head of gastrocnemius muscle; lumbar subsegment of spinal cord; quadriceps femoris muscle; tibialis anterior muscle; vastus lateralis muscle; genital tubercle; skeletal muscle tissue; More reference expression data
BioGPS	More reference expression data
Gene ontology
Molecular function	sequence-specific DNA binding; DNA binding; RNA polymerase II transcription regulatory region sequence-specific DNA binding; DNA-binding transcription activator activity, RNA polymerase II-specific; DNA-binding transcription factor activity, RNA polymerase II-specific
Cellular component	cyclin-dependent protein kinase activating kinase holoenzyme complex; nucleus; nuclear body; nucleoplasm
Biological process	multicellular organism development; skeletal system development; proximal/distal pattern formation; neuromuscular process; regulation of transcription, DNA-templated; embryonic limb morphogenesis; transcription, DNA-templated; positive regulation of cell population proliferation; anterior/posterior pattern specification; spinal cord motor neuron cell fate specification; transcription by RNA polymerase II; positive regulation of transcription by RNA polymerase II; negative regulation of cold-induced thermogenesis
Sources:Amigo / QuickGO
Orthologs
Databases	NCBI: entry; OMA: entry
Species	Human	Mouse
Entrez	3226	209448
Ensembl	ENSG00000180818	ENSMUSG00000022484
UniProt	Q9NYD6	P31257
RefSeq (mRNA)	NM_017409	NM_010462
RefSeq (protein)	NP_059105	NP_034592
Location (UCSC)	Chr 12: 53.99 – 53.99 Mb	Chr 15: 102.88 – 102.88 Mb
PubMed search
- Wikidata
View/Edit Human	View/Edit Mouse

Homeobox protein Hox-C10 is a protein that in humans is encoded by the HOXC10 gene.

== Function ==
This gene belongs to the homeobox family of genes. The homeobox genes encode a highly conserved family of transcription factors that play an important role in morphogenesis in all multicellular organisms. Mammals possess four similar homeobox gene clusters, HOXA, HOXB, HOXC and HOXD, which are located on different chromosomes and consist of 9 to 11 genes arranged in tandem. This gene is one of several homeobox HOXC genes located in a cluster on chromosome 12. The protein level is controlled during cell differentiation and proliferation, which may indicate this protein has a role in origin activation.

== Pathology ==
- HOXC10 is overexpressed in breast cancer and transcriptionally regulated by estrogen via involvement of histone methylases MLL3 and MLL4.
- Methylation of the estrogen-repressed gene HOXC10 in breast cancer determines resistance to aromatase inhibitors. This epigenetic reprogramming of HOXC10 is observed in endocrine-resistant breast cancer.
