= Cryptitis =

Inflammation of an intestinal crypt

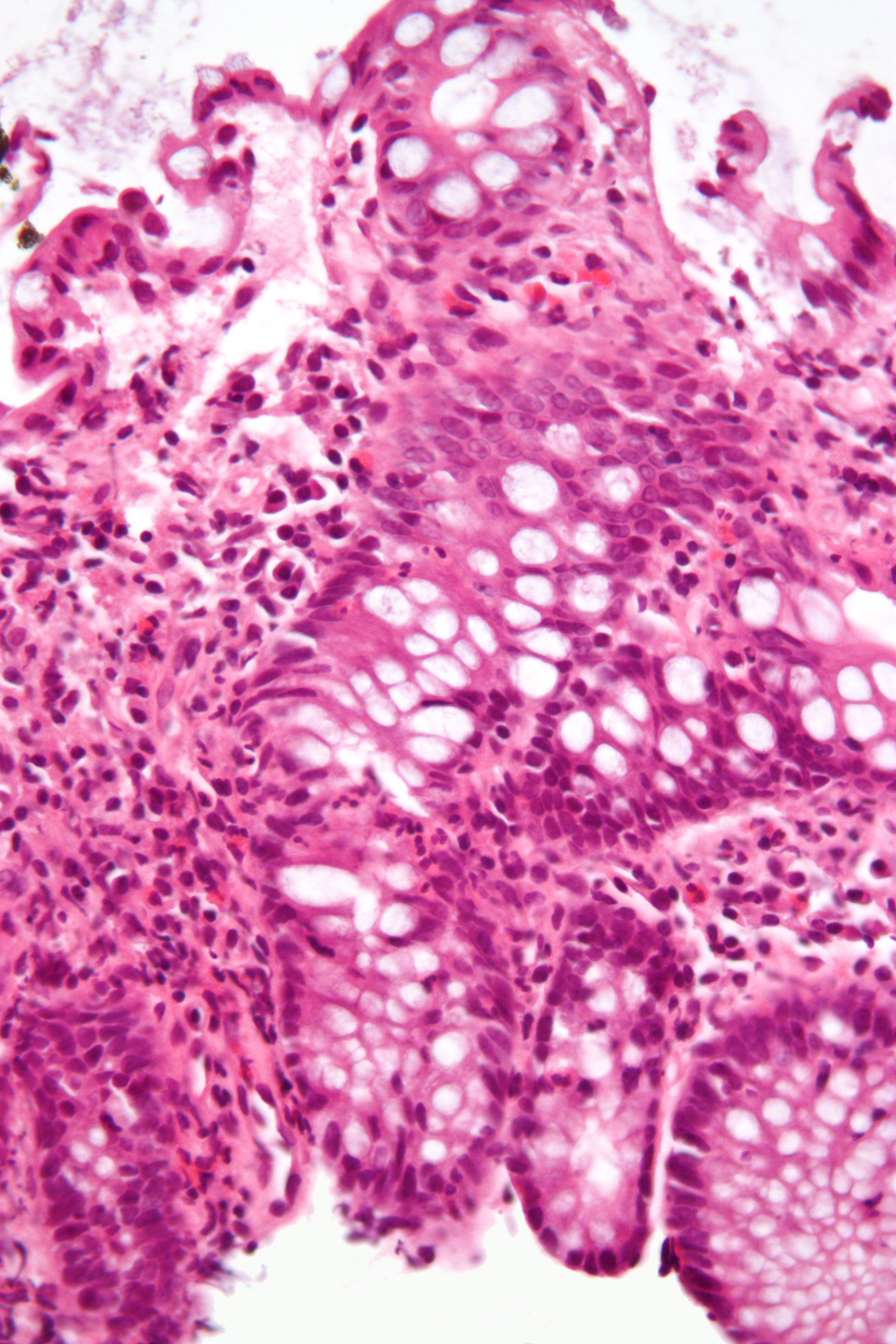
Micrograph showing cryptitis in a case of Crohn's disease. H&E stain.

In histology, cryptitis refers to inflammation of an intestinal crypt.

Cryptitis is a non-specific histopathologic finding that is seen in several conditions, e.g. inflammatory bowel disease, diverticular disease, radiation colitis, infectious colitis.

== Additional images ==
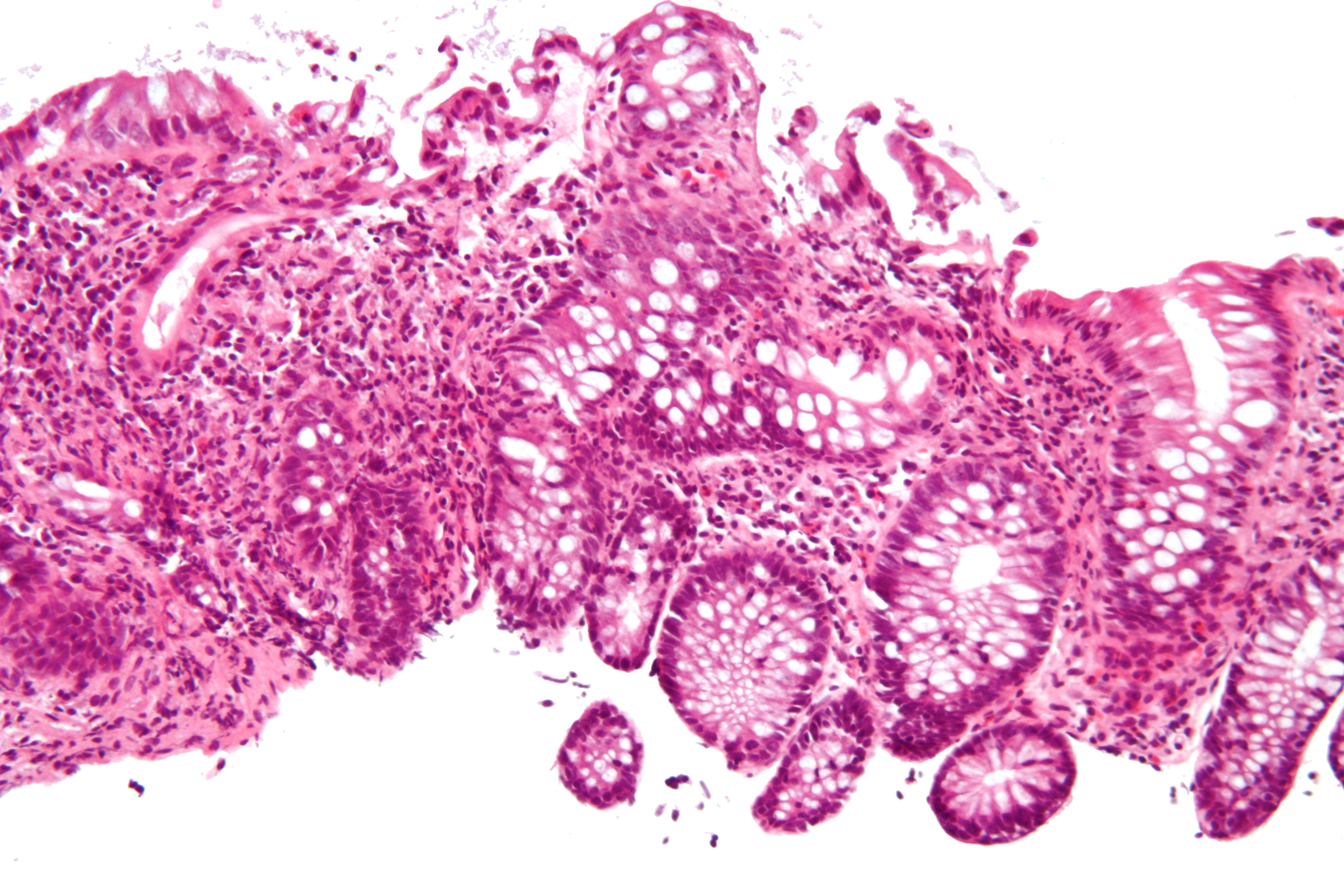
Cryptitis. H&E stain.

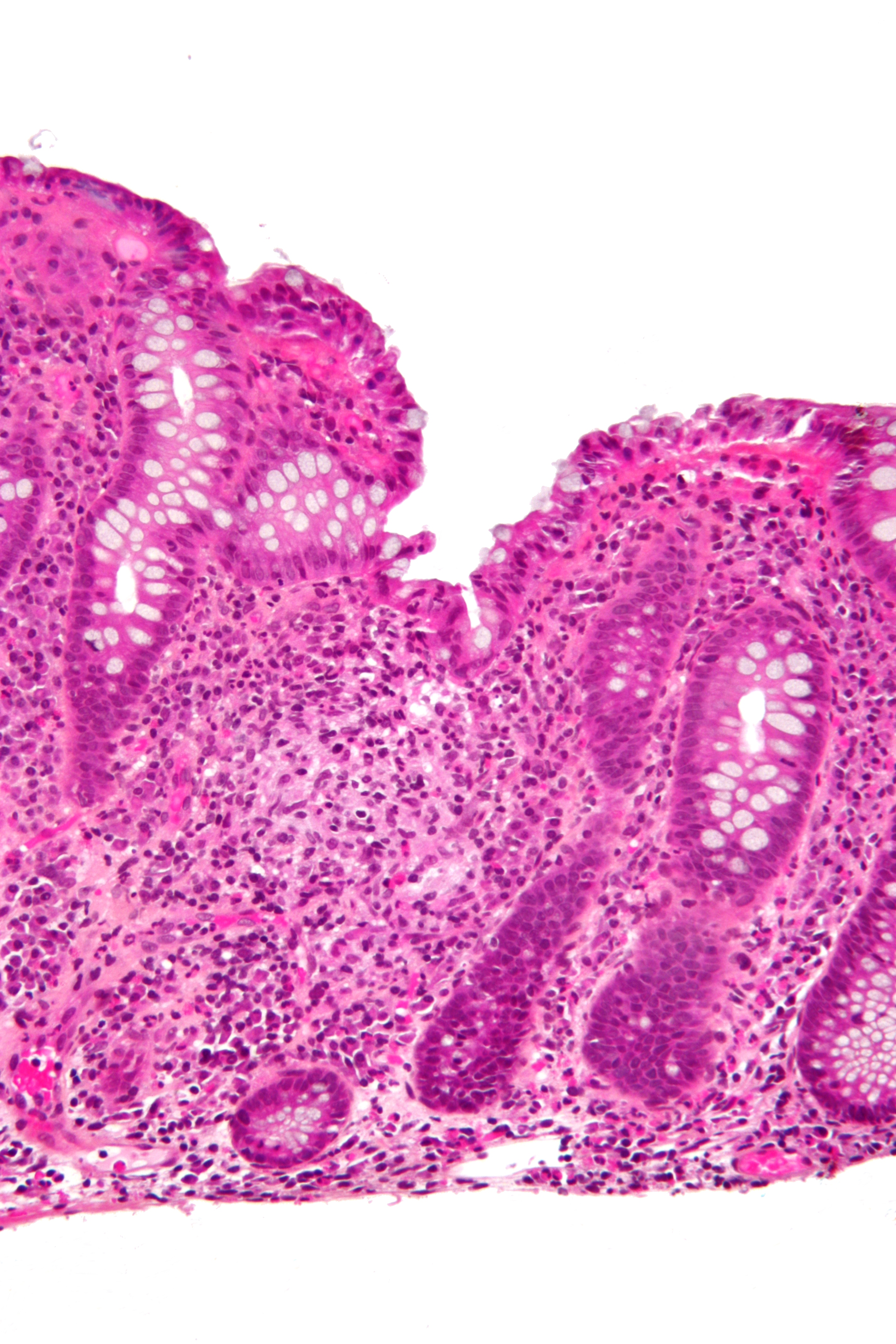
Focal cryptitis and a granuloma. H&E stain.

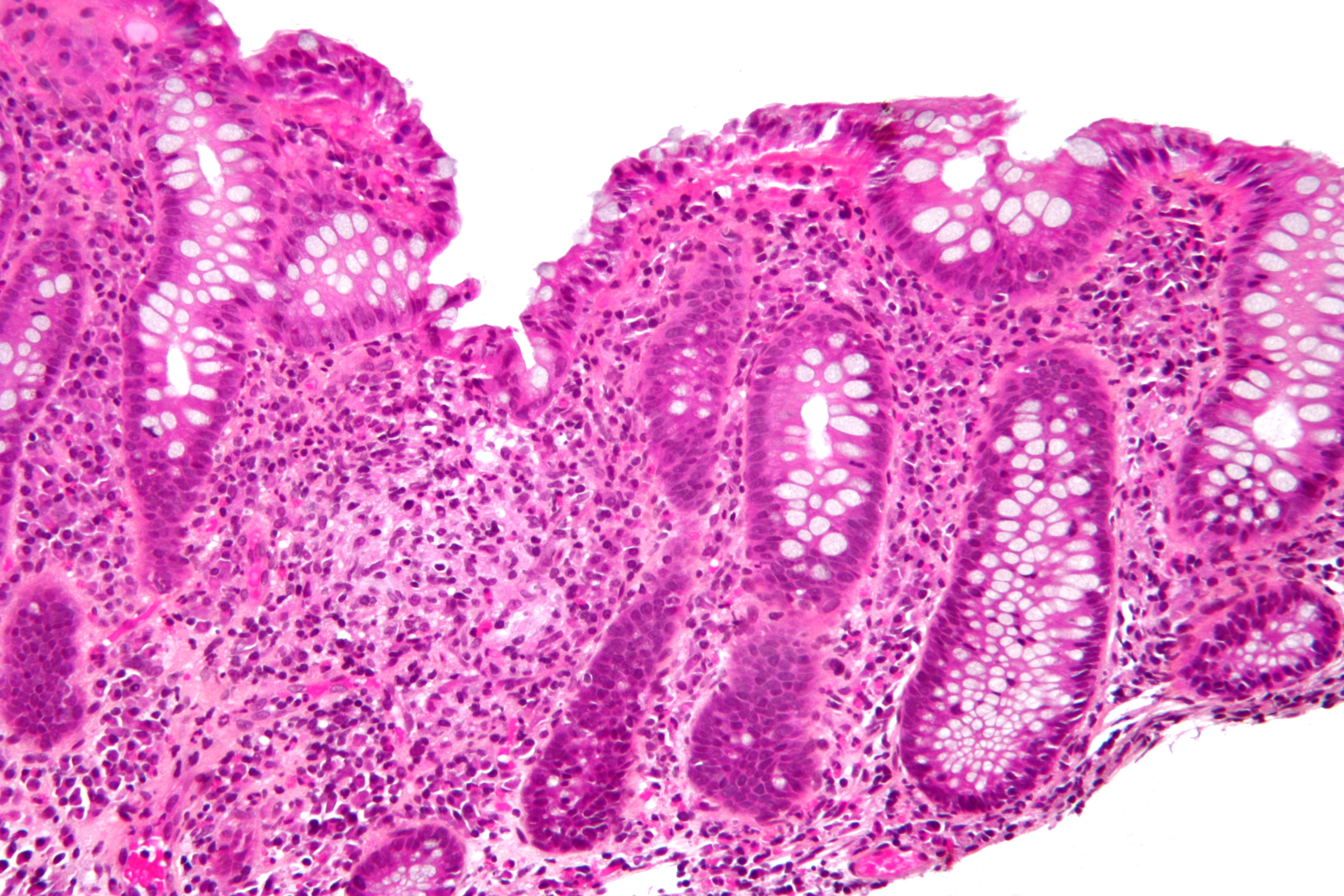
Focal cryptitis and a granuloma. H&E stain.

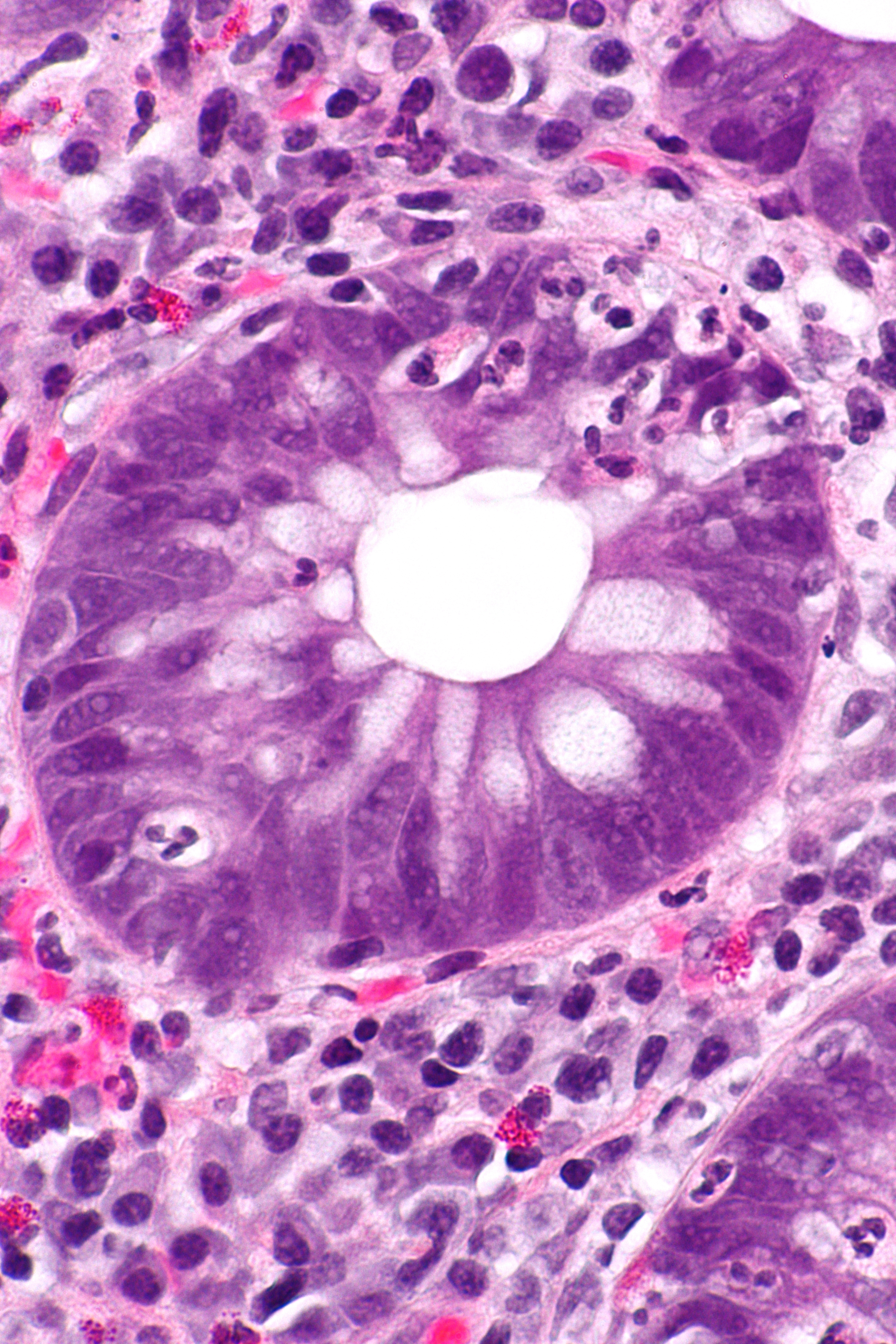

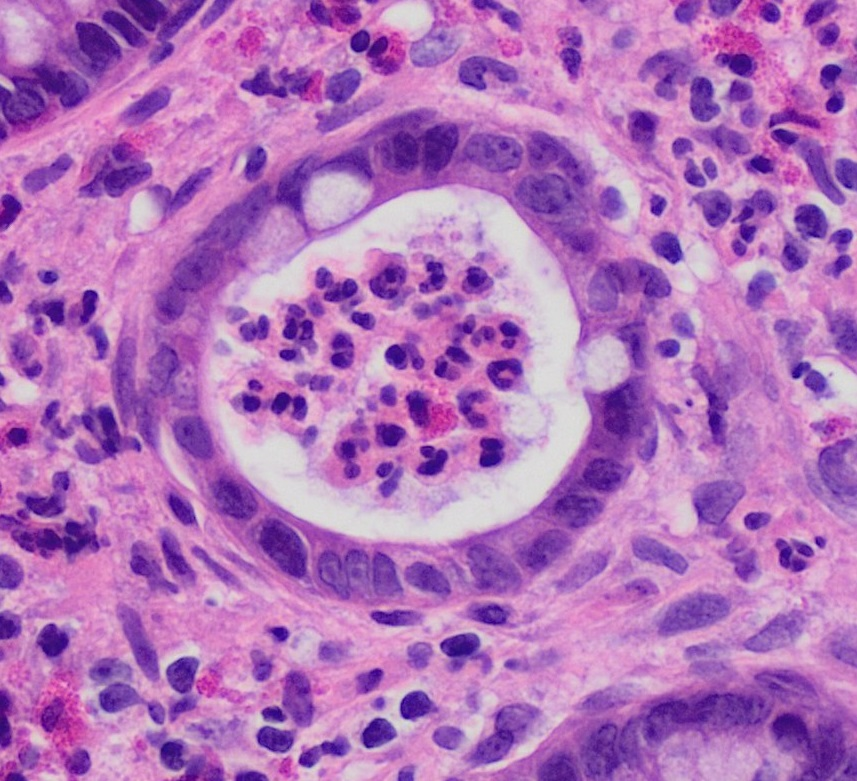
Crypt abscess. H&E stain.
