= ASCL2 =

Protein-coding gene in humans

Identifiers
- Aliases: ASCL2, ASH2, HASH2, MASH2, bHLHa45, achaete-scute family bHLH transcription factor 2
- External IDs: OMIM: 601886; MGI: 96920; GeneCards: ASCL2

Gene location (Human)
Chr.	Chromosome 11 (human)
Band	11p15.5	Start	2,268,498 bp
Band	11p15.5	End	2,270,588 bp

Gene location (Mouse)
Chr.	Chromosome 7 (mouse)
Band	7 F5|7 88.08 cM	Start	142,520,566 bp
Band	7 F5|7 88.08 cM	End	142,523,001 bp
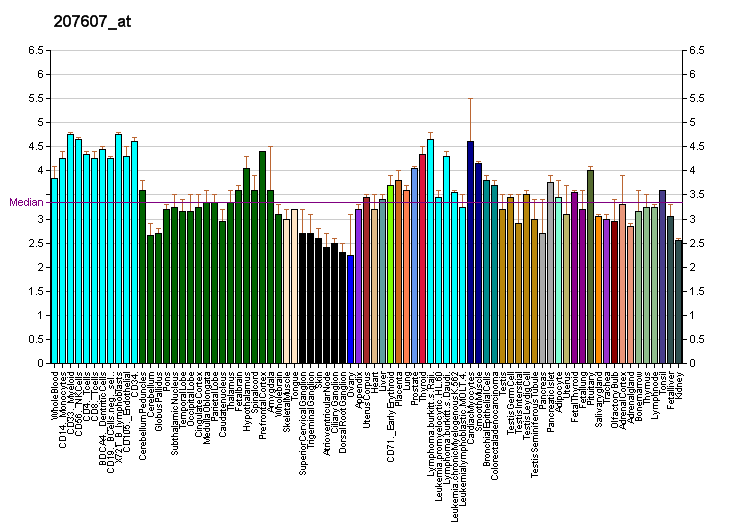
RNA expression pattern
Bgee	Human / Mouse (ortholog); Top expressed in: granulocyte; parotid gland; decidua; monocyte; testicle; gingival epithelium; mucosa of transverse colon; palpebral conjunctiva; mucosa of ileum; blood / Top expressed in: trophoblast cell; chorion; Paneth cell; rib; lacrimal gland; embryo; female urethra; basisphenoid; granulocyte; hair; More reference expression data
BioGPS	More reference expression data
Gene ontology
Molecular function	DNA binding; protein dimerization activity; RNA polymerase II cis-regulatory region sequence-specific DNA binding; DNA-binding transcription repressor activity, RNA polymerase II-specific; E-box binding; DNA-binding transcription factor activity, RNA polymerase II-specific; DNA-binding transcription factor activity; sequence-specific DNA binding; RNA polymerase II transcription regulatory region sequence-specific DNA binding; transcription factor binding
Cellular component	nucleus; RNA polymerase II transcription regulator complex; cytoplasm
Biological process	cell differentiation; spongiotrophoblast layer development; response to hypoxia; regulation of transcription, DNA-templated; regulation of transcription by RNA polymerase II; negative regulation of transcription by RNA polymerase II; transcription, DNA-templated; nervous system development; multicellular organism development; regulation of neurogenesis; in utero embryonic development; placenta development; negative regulation of Schwann cell proliferation; somatic stem cell population maintenance; spongiotrophoblast differentiation; sensory organ development; neuron differentiation; positive regulation of transcription by RNA polymerase II
Sources:Amigo / QuickGO
Orthologs
Databases	NCBI: entry; OMA: entry
Species	Human	Mouse
Entrez	430	17173
Ensembl	ENSG00000183734	ENSMUSG00000009248
UniProt	Q99929	O35885
RefSeq (mRNA)	NM_005170	NM_008554
RefSeq (protein)	NP_005161	NP_032580
Location (UCSC)	Chr 11: 2.27 – 2.27 Mb	Chr 7: 142.52 – 142.52 Mb
PubMed search
- Wikidata
View/Edit Human	View/Edit Mouse

Achaete-scute complex homolog 2 (Drosophila), also known as ASCL2, is an imprinted human gene.

== Function ==
This gene is a member of the basic helix-loop-helix (BHLH) family of transcription factors. It activates transcription by binding to the E box (5'-CANNTG-3'). Dimerization with other BHLH proteins is required for efficient DNA binding. Involved in the determination of the neuronal precursors in the peripheral nervous system and the central nervous system.

Ascl2 plays a critical role in early gestation, with its products showing up in the oocyte and the two-cell stage of the zygote. This gene has its primary role after implantation of the developing embryo. It is expressed in trophoblast cells on the maternal allele. Its expression is required for the progenitor cells within the ectoplacental cone (EPC), which establishes the first functional maternal-fetal interactions before placental development is completed. The ectoplacental cone continues to develop and differentiate into other cell types which express the Ascl2 gene in the differentiated derivatives. It is specifically found in the spongiotrophoblast cells of the junctional zone. In the mature placenta, glycogen trophoblast (Gly2) cells are found in the junctional zone. Without Ascl2, the GlyT cells are not found and even though these cells develop later in gestation, its progenitor cells are established early on. If a null allele is inherited, the embryo will fail to develop. Insufficient Ascl2 function is also associated with a placenta that has phenotypic defects, which leads to growth retardation.

Achaete-scute complex homolog 2 (ASCL2) is a maternally expressed imprinted gene that codes is a part of the basic helix-loop-helix (BHLH) transcription factor family. ASCL2 is particularly important during implantation of the developing embryo, specifically in placental development and neuronal precursor determination. Loss of function of ASCL2 will result in embryonic failure. In 2006, ASCL2 was observed to be involved in tumor progression, specifically, ASCL2 was reported to be upregulated in colorectal tumors (Jubb et al). In 2010, Tian et al reported that ASCL2's involvement in metastasis could be attributed by ASCL2-promoted cellular self-renewal as opposed to cellular differentiation. In 2019, Farmarzi reported a potential link between ASCL2 and breast cancer tumorigenesis which had never previously been demonstrated. ASCL2 expression was noted in multiple breast cancer cell lines, most notably in MCF7 cells. siRNA KO of ASCL2 was shown to inhibit cellular migration of breast cancer cells. Further, ASCL2 knockdown altered the expression of BIRC5 and CD44, which are Wnt-associated genes.

== Interactions ==
ASCL2 has been shown to interact with NCOA6 and RBBP5.

== See also ==
- List of intestinal stem cell marker genes
