= HBXIP =

Protein-coding gene in humans

LAMTOR5
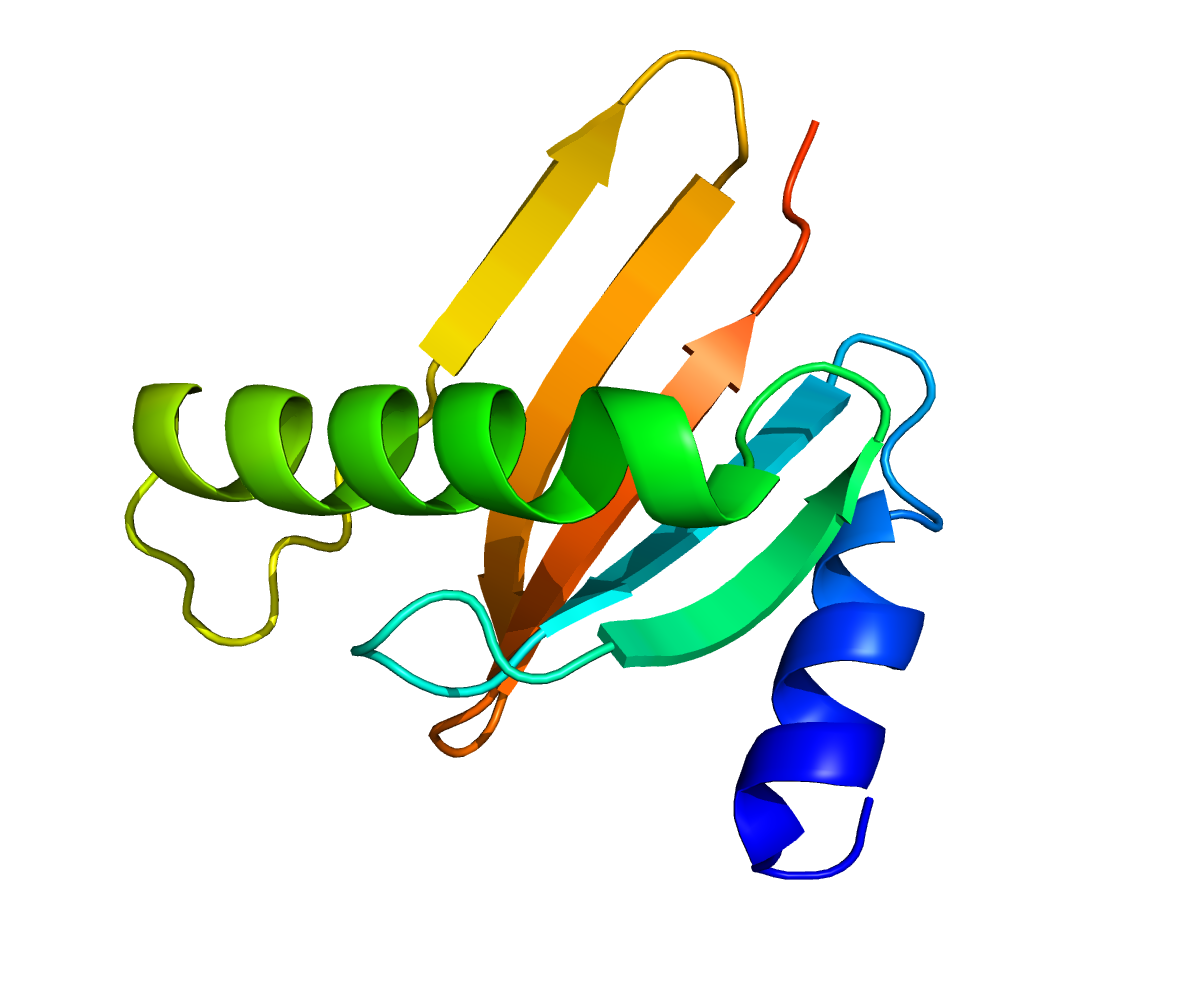

Identifiers
- Aliases: LAMTOR5, HBXIP, XIP, late endosomal/lysosomal adaptor, MAPK and MTOR activator 5
- External IDs: OMIM: 608521; MGI: 1915826; GeneCards: LAMTOR5
Available structures
PDB	Ortholog search: PDBe RCSB
PDB	List of PDB id codes 3MS6, 3MSH

Gene location (Human)
Chr.	Chromosome 1 (human)
Band	1p13.3	Start	110,401,249 bp
Band	1p13.3	End	110,407,942 bp

Gene location (Mouse)
Chr.	Chromosome 3 (mouse)
Band	3|3 F2.3	Start	107,186,174 bp
Band	3|3 F2.3	End	107,191,398 bp
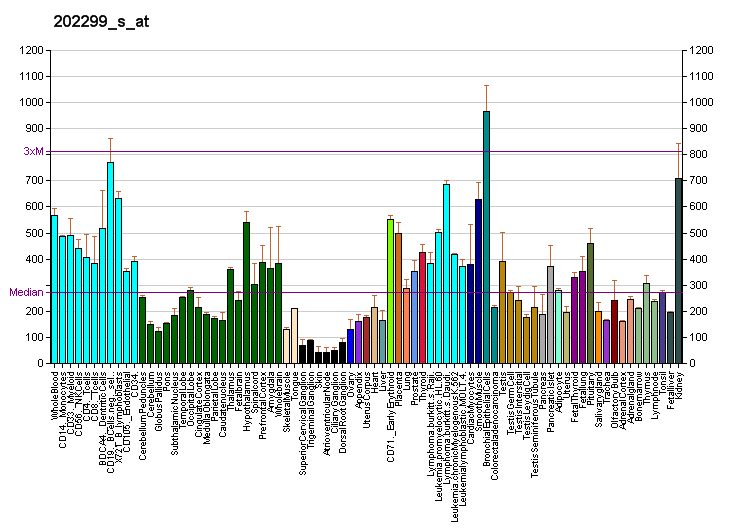

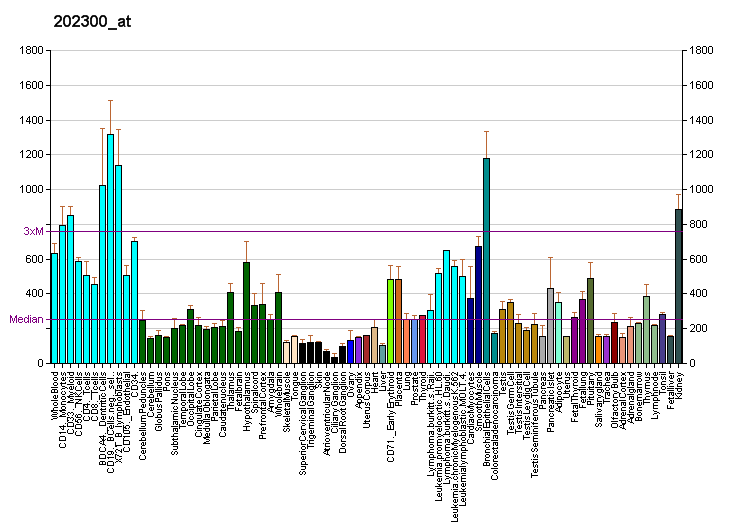
RNA expression pattern
Bgee	Human / Mouse (ortholog); Top expressed in: kidney tubule; islet of Langerhans; palpebral conjunctiva; monocyte; human kidney; apex of heart; muscle of thigh; left ventricle; anterior pituitary; glomerulus / Top expressed in: right kidney; yolk sac; facial motor nucleus; medial ganglionic eminence; proximal tubule; human kidney; endocardial cushion; embryo; anterior horn of spinal cord; embryo; More reference expression data
BioGPS	More reference expression data
Gene ontology
Molecular function	guanyl-nucleotide exchange factor activity; protein binding; molecular adaptor activity
Cellular component	cytoplasm; cytosol; Ragulator complex; lysosomal membrane; lysosome
Biological process	regulation of cell size; negative regulation of cysteine-type endopeptidase activity involved in apoptotic process; viral genome replication; response to virus; negative regulation of apoptotic process; protein localization to lysosome; cellular response to amino acid stimulus; positive regulation of TOR signaling; regulation of macroautophagy; positive regulation of TORC1 signaling
Sources:Amigo / QuickGO
Orthologs
Databases	NCBI: entry; OMA: entry
Species	Human	Mouse
Entrez	10542	68576
Ensembl	ENSG00000134248	ENSMUSG00000087260
UniProt	O43504	Q9D1L9
RefSeq (mRNA)	NM_006402; NM_001382293	NM_026774
RefSeq (protein)	NP_006393; NP_001369222; NP_006393.2	NP_081050
Location (UCSC)	Chr 1: 110.4 – 110.41 Mb	Chr 3: 107.19 – 107.19 Mb
PubMed search
- Wikidata
View/Edit Human	View/Edit Mouse

Hepatitis B virus X-interacting protein is a protein that in humans is encoded by the HBXIP gene.

This gene encodes a protein that specifically complexes with the C-terminus of hepatitis B virus X protein (HBx). The function of this protein is to negatively regulate HBx activity and thus to alter the replication life cycle of the virus.

== Interactions ==
HBXIP has been shown to interact with NCOA6.
