= HIST2H3C =

Human protein-coding gene

H3C14

Identifiers
- Aliases: H3C14, H3, H3.2, H3/M, H3F2, H3FM, H3FN, histone cluster 2, H3c, histone cluster 2 H3 family member c, HIST2H3C, H3 clustered histone 14, H3C15, H3C13
- External IDs: OMIM: 142780; MGI: 3650546; GeneCards: H3C14
Available structures
PDB	Ortholog search: PDBe RCSB
PDB	List of PDB id codes 2IIJ, 2X4W, 2X4X, 2X4Y, 3AV1, 3DB3, 3MO8, 3R93, 4MZF, 4MZG, 4MZH, 4OUC, 5BO0, 2HIO, 5B0Z, 2ARO, 1EQZ, 1HQ3, 4KGC, 1TZY, 4UUZ, 2F8N, 5B0Y, 4LD9, 5B40, 5CIU

Gene location (Human)
Chr.	Chromosome 1 (human)
Band	1q21.2	Start	149,840,687 bp
Band	1q21.2	End	149,841,208 bp
RNA expression pattern
Bgee	Human / Mouse (ortholog); Top expressed in: bone marrow cell; epithelium of colon; ganglionic eminence; ventricular zone; right uterine tube; cerebellum; cerebellar cortex; cerebellar hemisphere; right hemisphere of cerebellum; gonad / n/a; More reference expression data
BioGPS	n/a
Gene ontology
Molecular function	protein heterodimerization activity; DNA binding; histone binding; protein binding; chromatin binding; nucleosomal DNA binding
Cellular component	extracellular exosome; extracellular region; nucleoplasm; chromosome; nucleosome; nucleus; chromatin
Biological process	epigenetic maintenance of chromatin in transcription-competent conformation; blood coagulation; rDNA heterochromatin assembly; nucleosome assembly; negative regulation of gene expression, epigenetic; negative regulation of transcription by RNA polymerase II; chromatin organization; regulation of gene silencing by miRNA; interleukin-7-mediated signaling pathway; regulation of megakaryocyte differentiation; regulation of hematopoietic stem cell differentiation
Sources:Amigo / QuickGO
Orthologs
Databases	NCBI: entry; OMA: entry
Species	Human	Mouse
Entrez	126961	625328
Ensembl	ENSG00000203811	ENSMUSG00000082029
UniProt	Q71DI3	P02301
RefSeq (mRNA)	NM_021059	NM_001370931
RefSeq (protein)	NP_066403; NP_001116847	XP_894986
Location (UCSC)	Chr 1: 149.84 – 149.84 Mb	n/a
PubMed search
- Wikidata
View/Edit Human	View/Edit Mouse

Histone H3.2 is a protein that in humans is encoded by the HIST2H3C gene.

== Function ==
Histones are basic nuclear proteins that are responsible for the nucleosome structure of the chromosomal fiber in eukaryotes. This structure consists of approximately 146 bp of DNA wrapped around a nucleosome, an octamer composed of pairs of each of the four core histones (H2A, H2B, H3, and H4). The chromatin fiber is further compacted through the interaction of a linker histone, H1, with the DNA between the nucleosomes to form higher order chromatin structures. This gene is intronless and encodes a member of the histone H3 family. Transcripts from this gene lack polyA tails; instead, they contain a palindromic termination element. This gene is found in a histone cluster on chromosome 1. This gene is one of four histone genes in the cluster that are duplicated; this record represents the telomeric copy.

== Interactions ==
HIST2H3C has been shown to interact with NCOA6.
