= Intestinal gland =

Gland between the intestinal villi that produces new cells

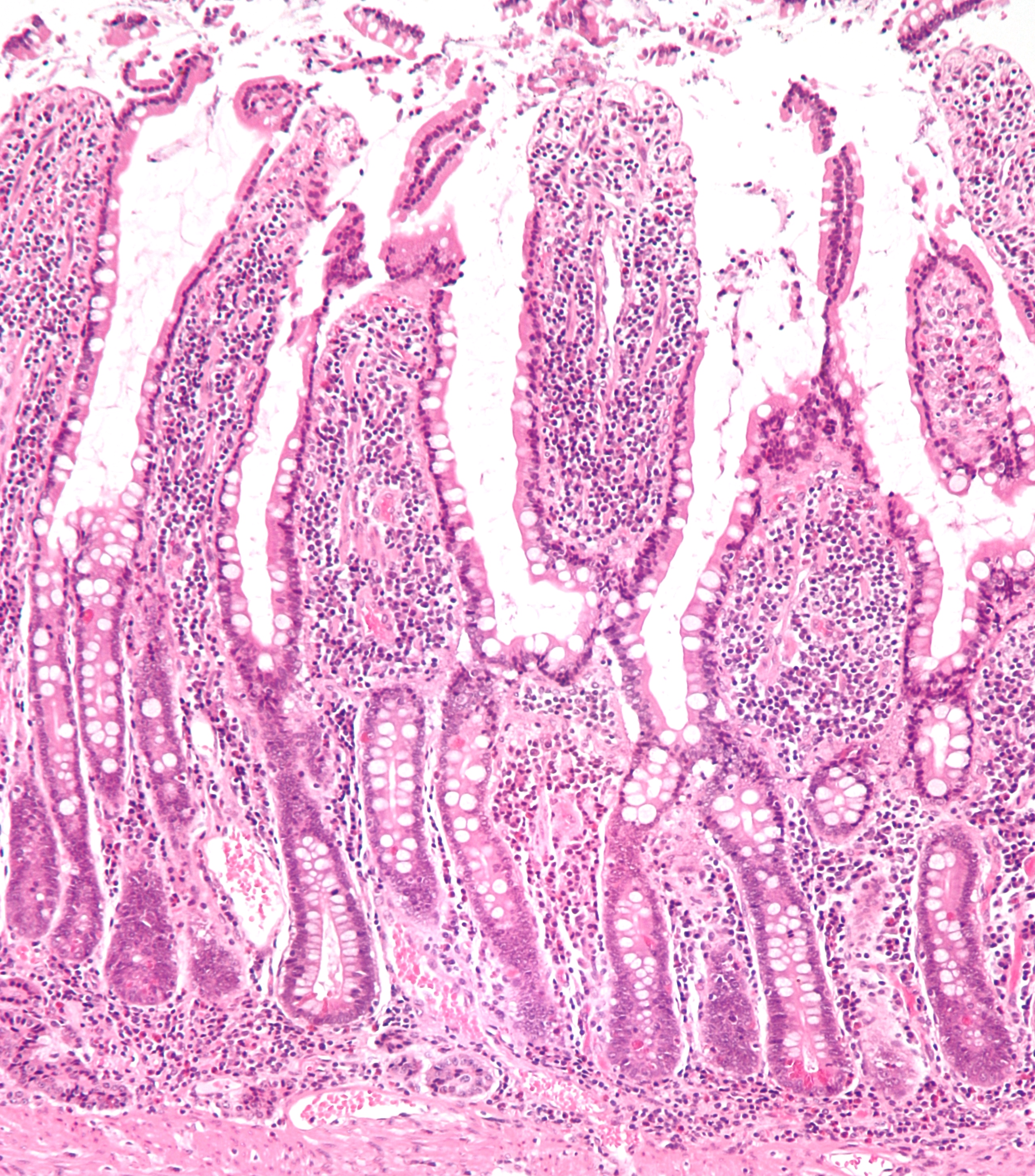
- Micrograph of the small intestine mucosa showing the intestinal glands - bottom 1/3 of image. H&E stain.

Details

Identifiers
- Latin: glandula intestinalis
- TA98: A05.6.01.012; A05.7.01.008
- TA2: 2942, 2969
- FMA: 63621 15052, 63621

In histology, an intestinal gland (also crypt of Lieberkühn and intestinal crypt) is a gland found in between villi in the intestinal epithelial lining of the small intestine and large intestine (or colon). The glands and intestinal villi are covered by epithelium, which contains multiple types of cells: enterocytes (digesting and absorbing nutrients and electrolytes), goblet cells (secreting mucus), enteroendocrine cells (secreting hormones), cup cells, tuft cells, and at the base of the gland, Paneth cells (secreting anti-microbial peptides) and intestinal stem cells. Underlying the epithelium of the crypts and villi is the lamina propria, which contains various stromal cells including fibroblasts, myofibroblasts, telocytes, vascular and lymphatic capillaries, and leukocytes.

== Structure ==
Intestinal glands are found in the epithelia of the small intestine, namely the duodenum, jejunum, and ileum, and in the large intestine (colon), where they are sometimes called colonic crypts. Intestinal glands of the small intestine contain a base of replicating stem cells, Paneth cells of the innate immune system, and goblet cells, which produce mucus. In the colon, crypts do not have Paneth cells.

== Function ==
The enterocytes in the small intestinal mucosa contain digestive enzymes that digest specific foods while they are being absorbed through the epithelium. These enzymes include peptidase, sucrase, maltase, lactase and intestinal lipase. This is in contrast to the gastric glands of the stomach where chief cells secrete pepsinogen.

Also, new epithelium is formed here, which is important because the cells at this site are continuously worn away by the passing food. The basal (further from the intestinal lumen) portion of the crypt contains multipotent stem cells. During each mitosis, one of the two daughter cells remains in the crypt as a stem cell, while the other differentiates and migrates up the side of the crypt and eventually into the villus. These stem cells can differentiate into either an absorptive (enterocytes) or secretory (Goblet cells, Paneth cells, enteroendocrine cells) lineages. Both Wnt and Notch signaling pathways play a large role in regulating cell proliferation and in intestinal morphogenesis and homeostasis.

Loss of proliferation control in the crypts is thought to lead to colorectal cancer.

=== Intestinal juice ===
Intestinal juice (also called succus entericus) refers to the clear to pale yellow watery secretions from the glands lining the small intestine walls. The Brunner's glands secrete large amounts of alkaline mucus in response to (1) tactile or irritating stimuli on the duodenal mucosa; (2) vagal stimulation, which increases Brunner's glands secretion concurrently with increase in stomach secretion; and (3) gastrointestinal hormones, especially secretin.

Its function is to complete the process begun by pancreatic juice; the enzyme trypsin exists in pancreatic juice in the inactive form trypsinogen, it is activated by the intestinal enterokinase in intestinal juice. Trypsin can then activate other protease enzymes and catalyze the reaction pro-colipase → colipase. Colipase is necessary, along with bile salts, to enable lipase function.

Intestinal juice also contains hormones, digestive enzymes, mucus, substances to neutralize hydrochloric acid coming from the stomach. Various exopeptidase which further digests polypeptides into amino acids complete the digestion of proteins.

== Colonic crypts ==
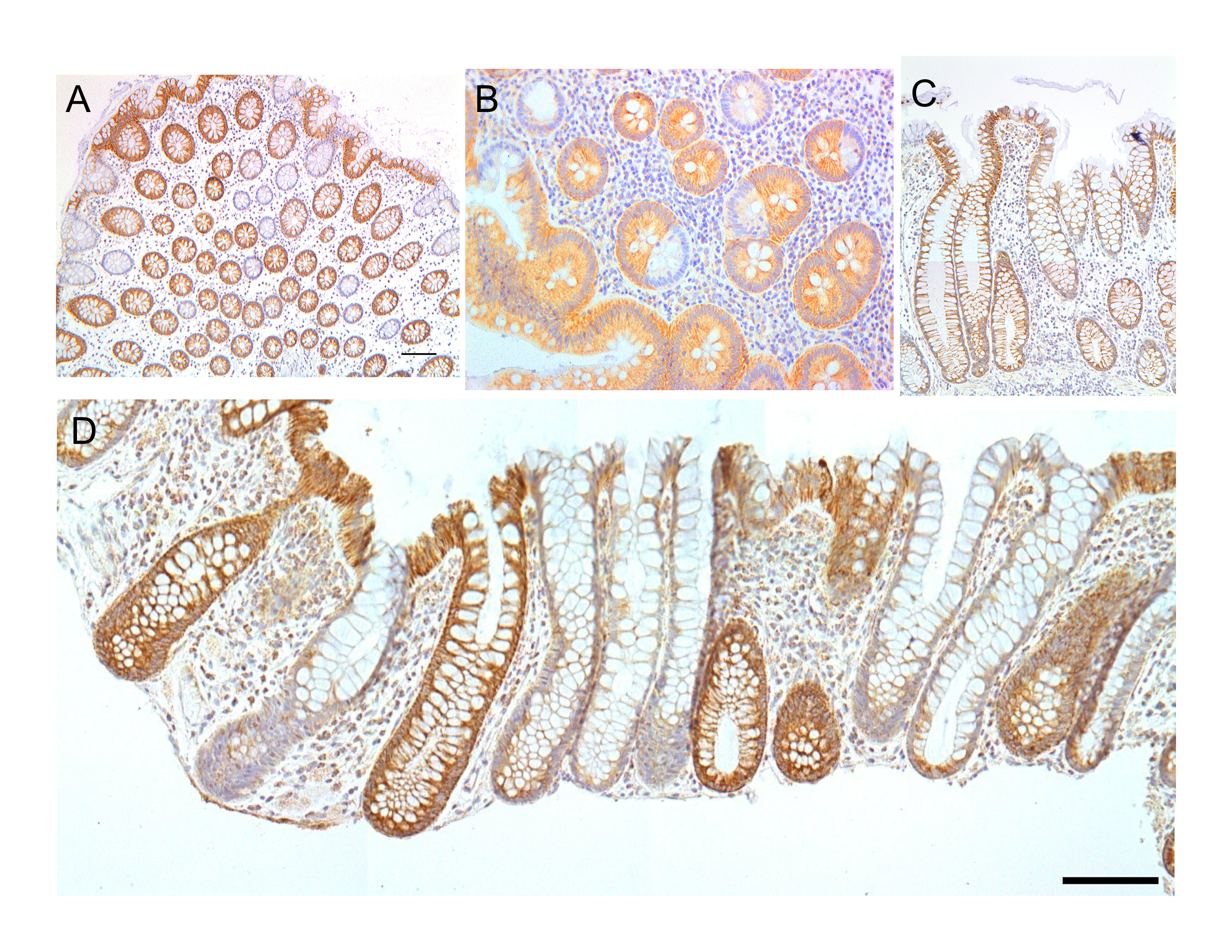
Colonic crypts (intestinal glands) within four tissue sections. In panel A, the bar shows 100 μm and allows an estimate of the frequency of crypts in the colonic epithelium. Panel B includes three crypts in cross-section, each with one segment deficient for CCOI expression and at least one crypt, on the right side, undergoing fission into two crypts. Panel C shows, on the left side, a crypt fissioning into two crypts. Panel D shows typical small clusters of two and three CCOI deficient crypts (the bar shows 50 μm). The images were made from original photomicrographs, but panels A, B and D were also included in an article

The intestinal glands in the colon are often referred to as colonic crypts. The epithelial inner surface of the colon is punctuated by invaginations, the colonic crypts. The colon crypts are shaped like microscopic thick-walled test tubes with a central hole down the length of the tube (the crypt lumen). Four tissue sections are shown here, two (A and B) cut across the long axes of the crypts and two (C and D) cut parallel to the long axes.

In these images the cells have been stained to show a brown-orange color if the cells produce a mitochondrial protein called cytochrome c oxidase subunit I (CCOI or COX-1). The nuclei of the cells (located at the outer edges of the cells lining the walls of the crypts) are stained blue-gray with haematoxylin. As seen in panels C and D, crypts are about 75 to about 110 cells long. The average crypt circumference is 23 cells. From the images, an average is shown to be about 1,725 to 2530 cells per colonic crypt. Another measure was attained giving a range of 1500 to 4900 cells per colonic crypt. Cells are produced at the crypt base and migrate upward along the crypt axis before being shed into the colonic lumen days later. There are 5 to 6 stem cells at the bases of the crypts.

As estimated from the image in panel A, there are about 100 colonic crypts per square millimeter of the colonic epithelium. The length of the human colon is, on average 160.5 cm (measured from the bottom of the cecum to the colorectal junction) with a range of 80 cm to 313 cm. The average inner circumference of the colon is 6.2 cm. Thus, the inner surface epithelial area of the human colon has an area, on average, of about 995 cm^{2}, which includes 9,950,000 (close to 10 million) crypts.

In the four tissue sections shown here, many of the intestinal glands have cells with a mitochondrial DNA mutation in the CCOI gene and appear mostly white, with their main color being the blue-gray staining of the nuclei. As seen in panel B, a portion of the stem cells of three crypts appear to have a mutation in CCOI, so that 40% to 50% of the cells arising from those stem cells form a white segment in the cross cut area.

Overall, the percentage of crypts deficient for CCOI is less than 1% before age 40, but then increases linearly with age. Colonic crypts deficient for CCOI reaches, on average, 18% in women and 23% in men, by 80–84 years of age.

Crypts of the colon can reproduce by fission, as seen in panel C, where a crypt is dividing to form two crypts, and in panel B where at least one crypt appears to be fissioning. Most crypts deficient in CCOI are in clusters of crypts (clones of crypts) with two or more CCOI-deficient crypts adjacent to each other (see panel D).

== Clinical significance ==
Crypt inflammation is known as cryptitis and characterized by the presence of neutrophils between the enterocytes. A severe cryptitis may lead to a crypt abscess.

Pathologic processes that lead to Crohn's disease, i.e. progressive intestinal crypt destruction, are associated with branching of the crypts.

Causes of crypt branching include:

- inflammatory bowel disease (e.g. ulcerative colitis, Crohn's disease),
- persistent infectious colitides, and
- ischemic colitis.
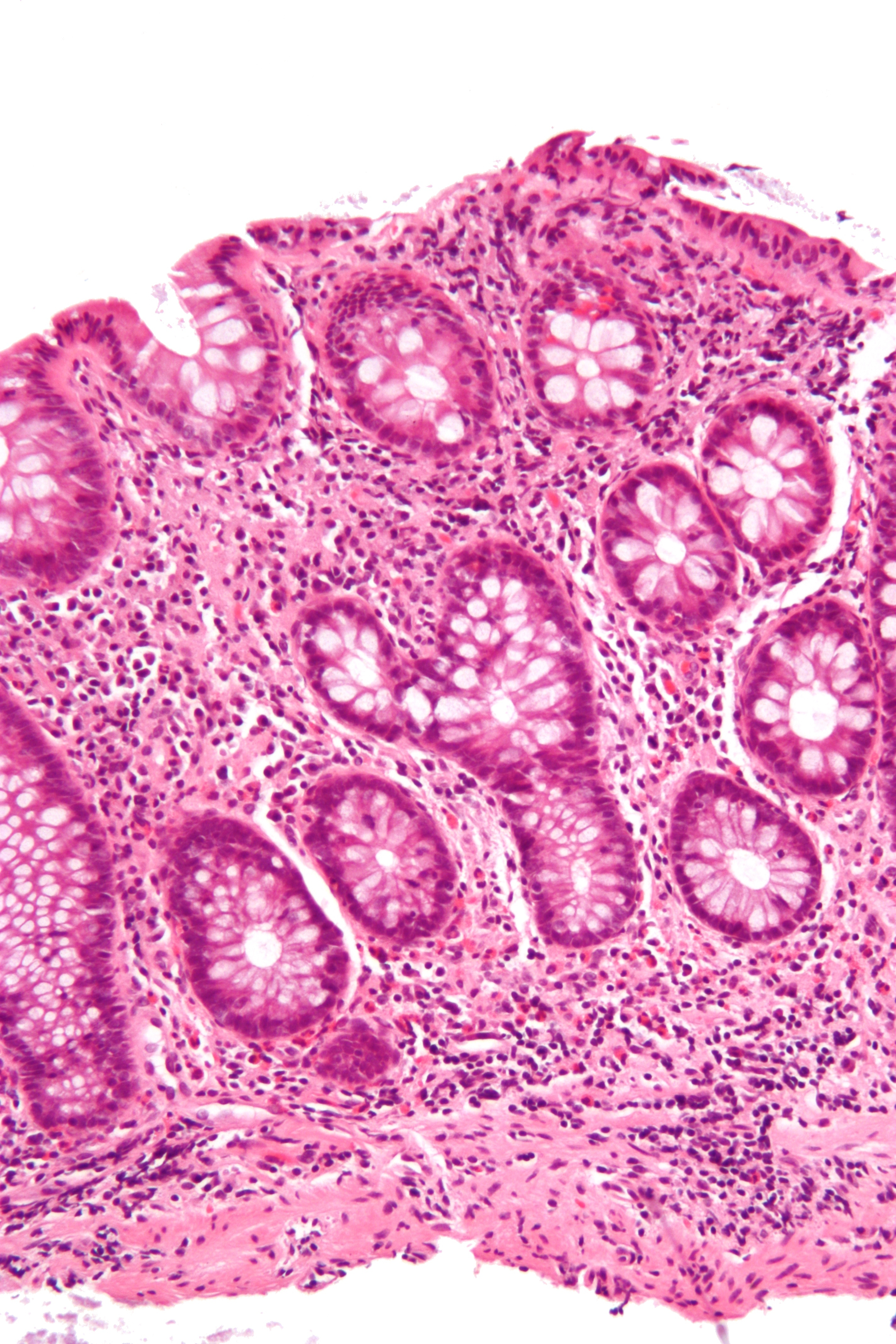
Micrograph showing intestinal crypt branching, a histopathological finding of chronic colitides. H&E stain.

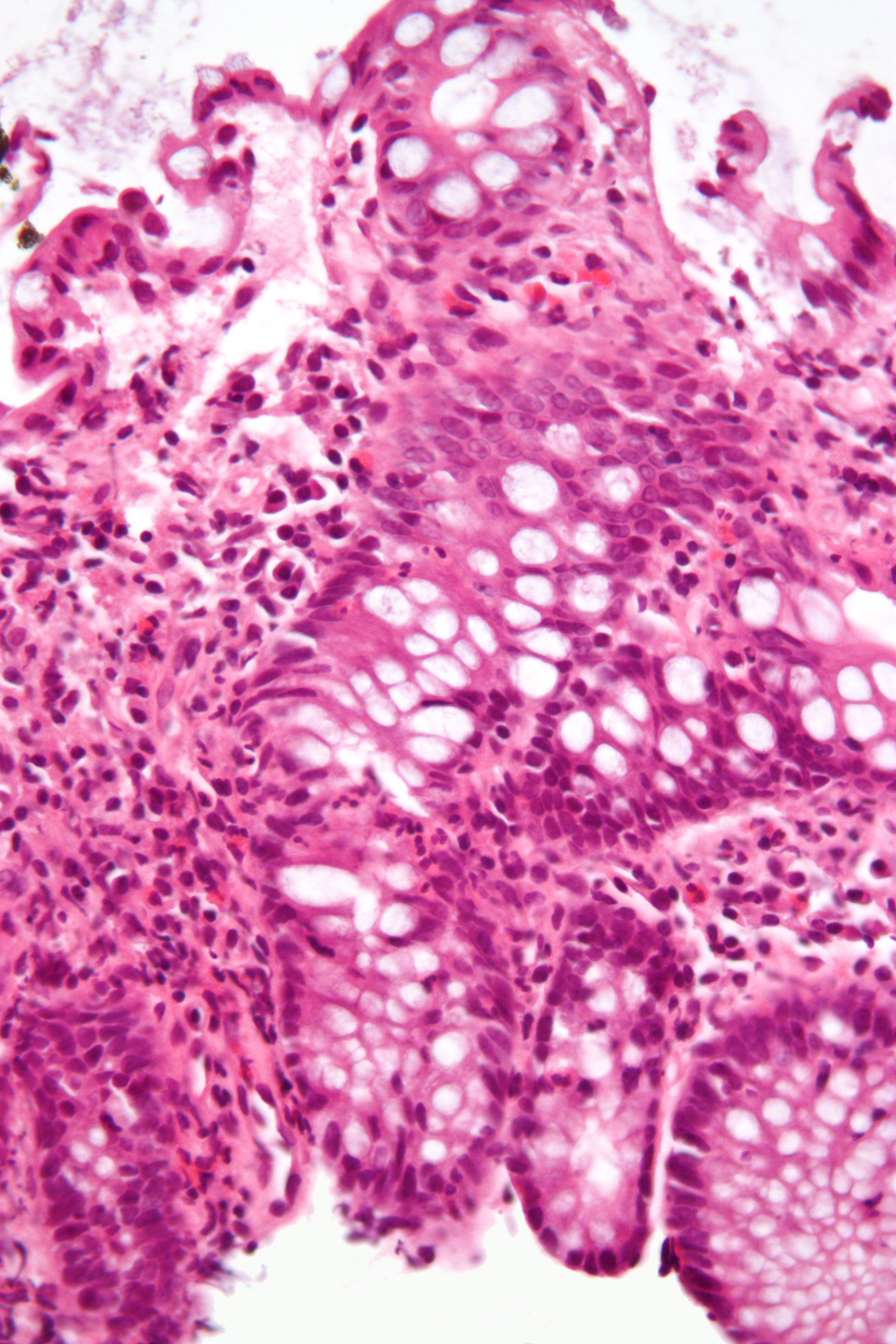
Micrograph showing crypt inflammation. H&E stain.

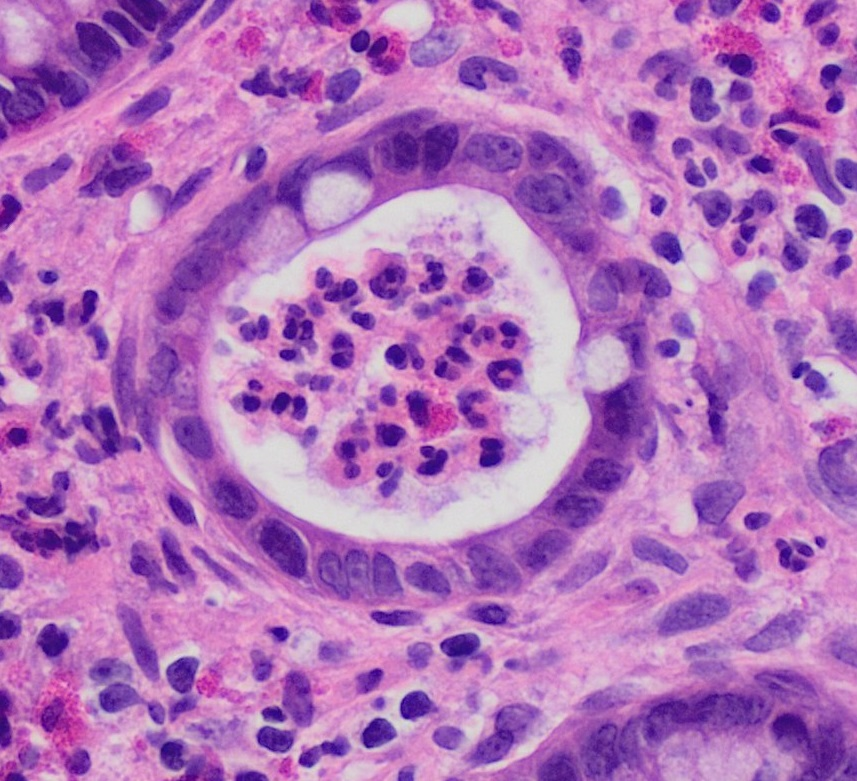
Crypt abscess. H&E stain.

== Research ==
Intestinal glands contain adult stem cells referred to as intestinal stem cells. These cells have been used in the field of stem biology to further understand stem cell niches, and to generate intestinal organoids.

== History ==
The crypts of Lieberkühn are named after the eighteenth-century German anatomist Johann Nathanael Lieberkühn.
