= NCOA6 =

Protein-coding gene in the species Homo sapiens

Identifiers
- Aliases: NCOA6, AIB3, ASC2, NRC, PRIP, RAP250, TRBP, nuclear receptor coactivator 6
- External IDs: OMIM: 605299; MGI: 1929915; HomoloGene: 40920; GeneCards: NCOA6; OMA:NCOA6 - orthologs

Gene location (Human)
| Chr. | Chromosome 20 (human) |
| Band | 20q11.22 | Start | 34,689,097 bp |
| Band | 20q11.22 | End | 34,825,651 bp |

Gene location (Mouse)
| Chr. | Chromosome 2 (mouse) |
| Band | 2|2 H1 | Start | 155,232,576 bp |
| Band | 2|2 H1 | End | 155,315,814 bp |
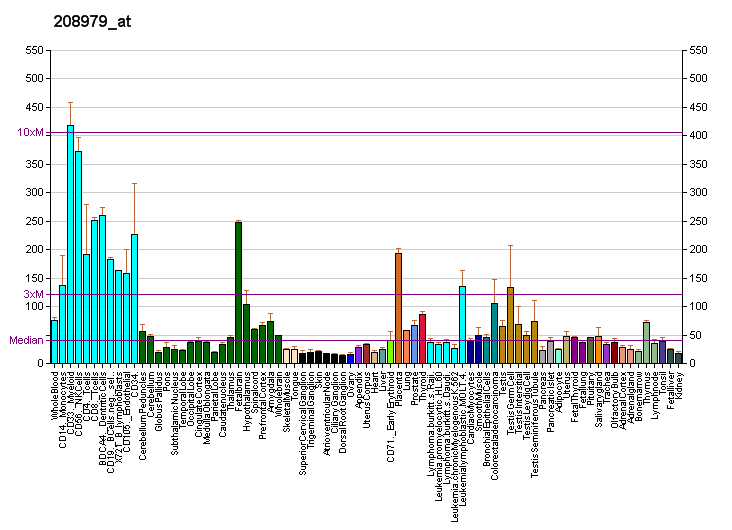
RNA expression pattern
| Bgee | Human / Mouse (ortholog); Top expressed in: secondary oocyte; ganglionic eminence; tibia; epithelium of nasopharynx; gingival epithelium; parietal pleura; pancreatic ductal cell; visceral pleura; ventricular zone; urethra / Top expressed in: zygote; secondary oocyte; genital tubercle; tail of embryo; spermatocyte; retinal pigment epithelium; vestibular sensory epithelium; primary oocyte; stroma of bone marrow; ganglionic eminence; More reference expression data |
| BioGPS | More reference expression data |
Gene ontology
| Molecular function | chromatin binding; protein binding; enzyme binding; estrogen receptor binding; retinoid X receptor binding; nuclear receptor coactivator activity; thyroid hormone receptor binding; transcription coactivator activity |
| Cellular component | intracellular membrane-bounded organelle; transcription regulator complex; nucleoplasm; nucleus; histone methyltransferase complex; cytosol |
| Biological process | myeloid cell differentiation; DNA recombination; regulation of transcription, DNA-templated; transcription, DNA-templated; cellular response to DNA damage stimulus; positive regulation of transcription, DNA-templated; DNA replication; development of the heart; brain development; DNA-templated transcription, initiation; response to hormone; DNA repair; intracellular estrogen receptor signaling pathway; glucocorticoid receptor signaling pathway; positive regulation of transcription by RNA polymerase II; regulation of lipid metabolic process |
Sources:Amigo / QuickGO
Orthologs
| Species | Human | Mouse |
| Entrez | 23054 | 56406 |
| Ensembl | ENSG00000198646 | ENSMUSG00000038369 |
| UniProt | Q14686 | Q9JL19 |
| RefSeq (mRNA) | NM_001242539; NM_014071; NM_001318240 | NM_001242558; NM_019825 |
| RefSeq (protein) | NP_001229468; NP_001305169; NP_054790 | n/a |
| Location (UCSC) | Chr 20: 34.69 – 34.83 Mb | Chr 2: 155.23 – 155.32 Mb |
| PubMed search |
- Wikidata
| View/Edit Human | View/Edit Mouse |

Nuclear receptor coactivator 6 is a protein that in humans is encoded by the NCOA6 gene.

== Function ==
The protein encoded by this gene is a transcriptional coactivator that can interact with nuclear hormone receptors to enhance their transcriptional activator functions. The encoded protein has been shown to be involved in the hormone-dependent coactivation of several receptors, including prostanoid, retinoid, vitamin D_{3}, thyroid hormone, and steroid receptors. The encoded protein may also act as a general coactivator since it has been shown to interact with some basal transcription factors, histone acetyltransferases, and methyltransferases.

== Interactions ==
NCOA6 has been shown to interact with:

- ASCL2 and
- Activating transcription factor 2,
- Androgen receptor,
- CREB-binding protein,
- DNA-PKcs,
- E2F1,
- EP300,
- Estrogen receptor alpha,
- Estrogen receptor beta,
- HBXIP,
- HIST2H3C,
- HSF1,
- Ku70,
- Ku80,
- Liver X receptor beta,
- MLL3,
- RBBP5,
- Retinoblastoma protein,
- Retinoic acid receptor alpha,
- Retinoid X receptor alpha,
- Src,
- TGS1,
- TUBA4A,
- TUBB,
- Thyroid hormone receptor alpha, and
- Thyroid hormone receptor beta.

== See also ==
- Transcription coregulator
