= RBBP5 =

Protein-coding gene in humans

Identifiers
- Aliases: RBBP5, RBQ3, SWD1, retinoblastoma binding protein 5, RB binding protein 5, histone lysine methyltransferase complex subunit
- External IDs: OMIM: 600697; MGI: 1918367; GeneCards: RBBP5
Available structures
PDB	Ortholog search: PDBe RCSB
PDB	List of PDB id codes 3P4F, 4X8N, 4X8P, 5F6K, 5F6L

Gene location (Human)
Chr.	Chromosome 1 (human)
Band	1q32.1	Start	205,086,142 bp
Band	1q32.1	End	205,122,015 bp

Gene location (Mouse)
Chr.	Chromosome 1 (mouse)
Band	1|1 E4	Start	132,405,103 bp
Band	1|1 E4	End	132,433,397 bp
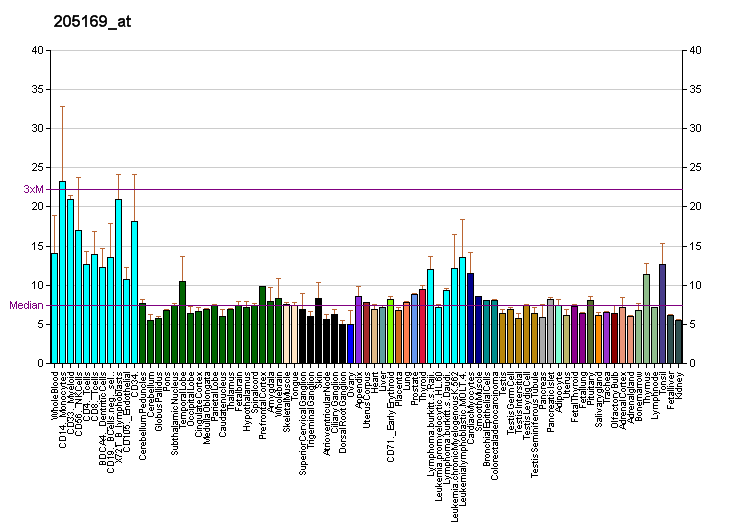
RNA expression pattern
Bgee	Human / Mouse (ortholog); Top expressed in: buccal mucosa cell; secondary oocyte; testicle; gonad; Achilles tendon; islet of Langerhans; ganglionic eminence; ventricular zone; stromal cell of endometrium; monocyte / Top expressed in: hand; condyle; fossa; zygote; trigeminal ganglion; otolith organ; tail of embryo; utricle; neural layer of retina; genital tubercle; More reference expression data
BioGPS	More reference expression data
Gene ontology
Molecular function	methylated histone binding; protein binding; histone methyltransferase activity (H3-K4 specific); histone-lysine N-methyltransferase activity
Cellular component	MLL1 complex; nucleolus; MLL3/4 complex; nucleus; nucleoplasm; histone methyltransferase complex; Set1C/COMPASS complex
Biological process	response to estrogen; histone H3-K4 methylation; regulation of transcription, DNA-templated; transcription, DNA-templated; cellular response to DNA damage stimulus; beta-catenin-TCF complex assembly; post-translational protein modification; regulation of megakaryocyte differentiation; chromatin organization
Sources:Amigo / QuickGO
Orthologs
Databases	NCBI: entry; OMA: entry
Species	Human	Mouse
Entrez	5929	213464
Ensembl	ENSG00000117222	ENSMUSG00000026439
UniProt	Q15291	Q8BX09
RefSeq (mRNA)	NM_001193272; NM_001193273; NM_005057	NM_172517; NM_001357486; NM_001357487
RefSeq (protein)	NP_001180201; NP_001180202; NP_005048	NP_766105; NP_001344415; NP_001344416
Location (UCSC)	Chr 1: 205.09 – 205.12 Mb	Chr 1: 132.41 – 132.43 Mb
PubMed search
- Wikidata
View/Edit Human	View/Edit Mouse

Retinoblastoma-binding protein 5 is a protein that in humans is encoded by the RBBP5 gene.

== Function ==
The protein encoded by this gene is a ubiquitously expressed nuclear protein and belongs to a highly conserved subfamily of WD-repeat proteins. It is found among several proteins that bind directly to retinoblastoma protein, which regulates cell proliferation. The encoded protein interacts preferentially with the underphosphorylated retinoblastoma protein via the E1A-binding pocket B.

== Interactions ==
RBBP5 has been shown to interact with:

- ASCL2,
- MLL,
- MLL3, and
- NCOA6.
