= ALCAM =

Protein-coding gene in the species Homo sapiens

Identifiers
- Aliases: ALCAM, CD166, MEMD, activated leukocyte cell adhesion molecule
- External IDs: OMIM: 601662; MGI: 1313266; GeneCards: ALCAM
Available structures
PDB	Ortholog search: PDBe RCSB
PDB	List of PDB id codes 5A2F

Gene location (Human)
Chr.	Chromosome 3 (human)
Band	3q13.11	Start	105,366,909 bp
Band	3q13.11	End	105,576,900 bp

Gene location (Mouse)
Chr.	Chromosome 16 (mouse)
Band	16|16 B5	Start	52,069,359 bp
Band	16|16 B5	End	52,274,437 bp
RNA expression pattern
Bgee	Human / Mouse (ortholog); Top expressed in: bronchial epithelial cell; mucosa of paranasal sinus; endothelial cell; palpebral conjunctiva; pars reticulata; corpus callosum; visceral pleura; external globus pallidus; pars compacta; trigeminal ganglion / Top expressed in: olfactory tubercle; vas deferens; right lung lobe; left lung lobe; stria vascularis; nucleus accumbens; anterior amygdaloid area; globus pallidus; ventromedial nucleus; lateral septal nucleus; More reference expression data
BioGPS	n/a
Gene ontology
Molecular function	protein binding; signaling receptor binding; identical protein binding
Cellular component	integral component of membrane; cell projection; membrane; focal adhesion; intrinsic component of plasma membrane; plasma membrane; integral component of plasma membrane; T cell receptor complex; extracellular region; axon; soma; dendrite; immunological synapse; extracellular exosome; external side of plasma membrane
Biological process	heterophilic cell-cell adhesion via plasma membrane cell adhesion molecules; adaptive immune response; immune system process; neuron projection extension; cell adhesion; motor neuron axon guidance; axon extension involved in axon guidance; signal transduction; retinal ganglion cell axon guidance; axon guidance
Sources:Amigo / QuickGO
Orthologs
Databases	NCBI: entry; OMA: entry
Species	Human	Mouse
Entrez	214	11658
Ensembl	ENSG00000170017	ENSMUSG00000022636
UniProt	Q13740	Q61490
RefSeq (mRNA)	NM_001627; NM_001243280; NM_001243281; NM_001243283	NM_009655; NM_001331110
RefSeq (protein)	NP_001230209; NP_001230210; NP_001230212; NP_001618	NP_001318039; NP_033785
Location (UCSC)	Chr 3: 105.37 – 105.58 Mb	Chr 16: 52.07 – 52.27 Mb
PubMed search
- Wikidata
View/Edit Human	View/Edit Mouse

CD166 antigen is a 100-105 kD typeI transmembrane glycoprotein that is a member of the immunoglobulin superfamily of proteins. In humans it is encoded by the ALCAM gene. It is also called CD166 (cluster of differentiation 166), MEMD, SC-1/DM-GRASP/BEN in the chicken, and KG-CAM in the rat.

Some literature sources have also cited it as the CD6 ligand (CD6L). It is expressed on activated T cells, activated monocytes, epithelial cells, fibroblasts, neurons, melanoma cells, and also in sweat and sebaceous glands. CD166 protein expression is reported to be upregulated in a cell line deriving from a metastasizing melanoma. CD166 plays an important role in mediating adhesion interactions between thymic epithelial cells and CD6+ cells during intrathymic T cell development.

Recently, CD166 has also been used as a potential cancer stem cell marker.

== See also ==
- List of intestinal stem cell marker genes
