= Lieberkühn reflector =

Illumination device in light microscopes

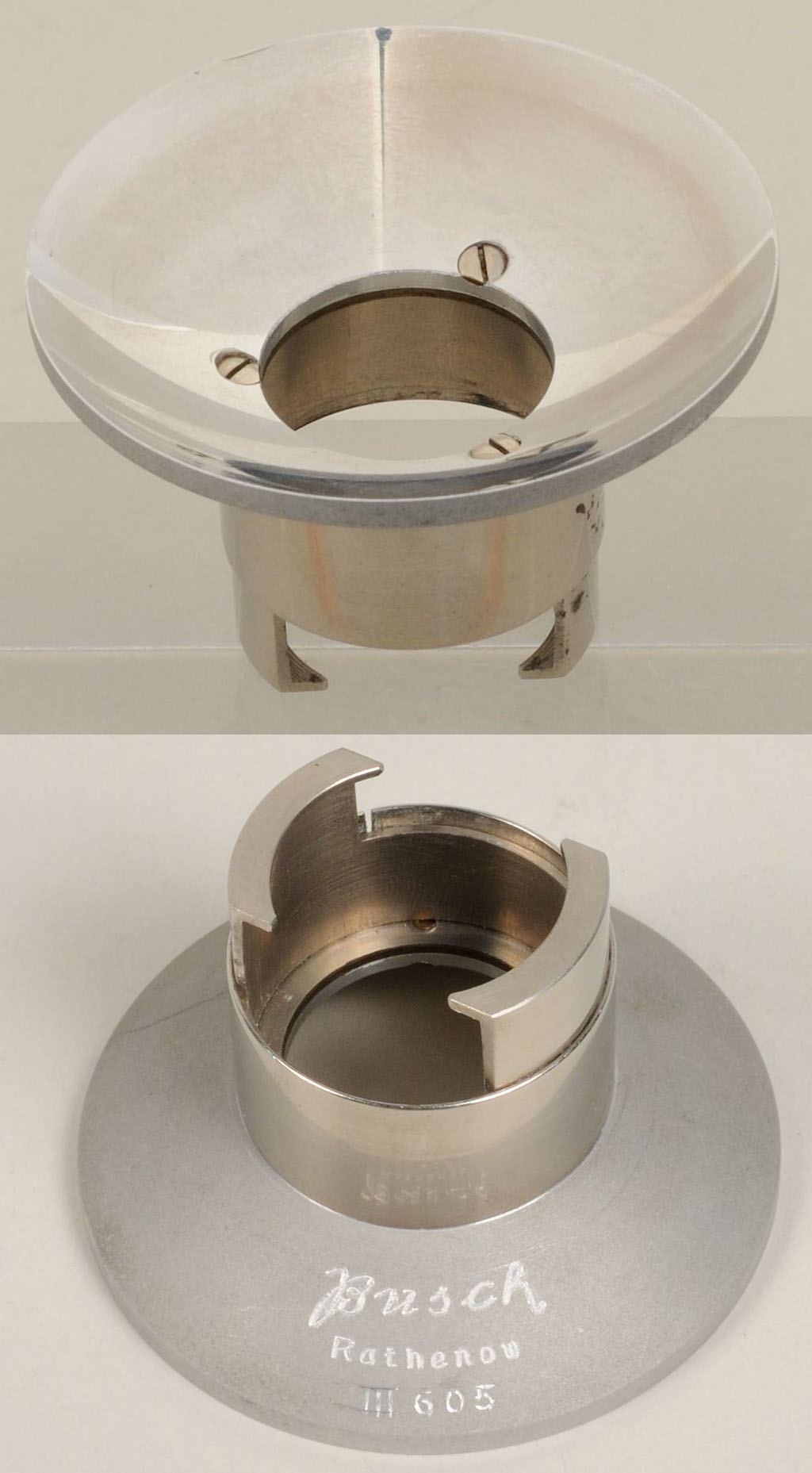
A Lieberkühn mirror from Emil Busch AG (now Rathenower Optische Werke) circa 1930, digital collection of the Deutsches Museum.

A Lieberkühn reflector (also known as Lieberkühn mirror or simply Lieberkühn) is an illumination device for incident light illumination (epi-illumination) in light microscopes. It encircles the objective, with the mirrored surface facing towards the specimen. This allows illuminating an opaque object from the side of the objective, with the light source positioned behind the specimen as in a transmission microscope.

The device is named after Johann Nathanael Lieberkühn (1711–1756) who used and popularized it but did not invent it. Similar mirrors were described and used by earlier microscopists.

== Operation and Light Path ==
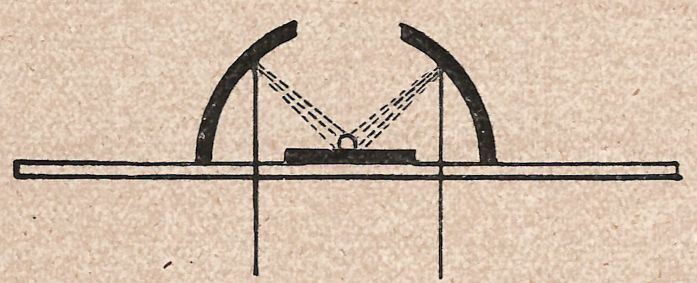
Diagram of illumination with Lieberkühn reflector. Light comes from below (vertical lines) and is reflected (dashed lines) on the concave surface of the mirror (black circular bars) to fall on the object (circle). The objective (not depicted) is located within the gap of the concave reflector. From.

The principle is explained for a modern upright compound microscope, where the light source illuminates the specimen from below. The light passes the object of interest laterally upwards. When using the Lieberkühn reflector, the opening in the microscope stage is covered with a flat glass plate upon which the specimen is placed. Typically, a dark disc is placed under the object to avoid direct light entering the objective

The Lieberkühn reflector completely surrounds the objective lens, featuring a central hole through which it is mounted onto the lens. The mirrored inner surface faces the specimen. A Lieberkühn reflector is typically a concave mirror (see illustrations), though one description uses a flat mirror at a 45-degree angle. When used in a compound microscope, the light must be directed from below and parallel to the optical axis. Thus, the illumination is different from the conventional Köhler illumination setup, where a condenser forms a light cone with the specimen at its focus. Instead, light passing laterally past the specimen is reflected at the Lieberkühn reflector and now falls from above from all sides onto the specimen, resulting in minimal shadow formation. Hence, the microscopic image appears with relatively low contrast. Since light that is reflected at object surfaces perpendicular to the optical axis (parallel to the microscope stage) will not be collected by the objective, this arrangement qualifies as darkfield illumination.

== Variations ==
By using apertures that restrict illumination to a part of the original field of illumination, the specimen is no longer illuminated from all sides but from a single direction, creating a stronger relief impression.

By omitting the dark disc beneath the specimen, mixed transmission brightfield and incident darkfield illumination can be achieved, which can be useful for certain specimens such as textiles.

When matte white surfaces replace a reflective Lieberkühn mirror, the specimen is illuminated with scattered light. This can also be achieved by using a matte filter between the light source and the microscope stage. A matte white Lieberkühn reflector can be made from plaster of Paris by filling it into a round container and pressing a rubber ball into the still moist plaster. After solidification and drilling a hole for the objective, the resulting plaster bell can be placed on the microscope stage.

== Limitations ==
A Lieberkühn mirror is usable only if the specimen is small enough to allow sufficient light to pass laterally. Therefore, its applicability also depends on the size of the hole in the microscope stage. Objects of less than one centimeter in size are advantageous.

The objective lens should not be too close to the specimen, as it will cast a shadow on the specimen, rendering it dark. Therefore, objectives with several millimeters of working distance are preferred. These are typically low-magnification objectives without immersion.

== History ==
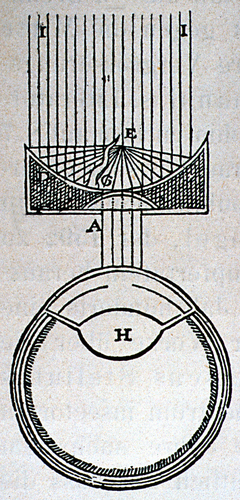
Drawing of a simple microscope by Descartes, 1637. The specimen (E) is held by a metal pin (G). The incoming light is redirected onto the specimen by the mirror. The specimen is magnified by the plano-concave glass lens at the bottom of the housing and viewed by the observer's eye.

René Descartes published his book Dioptrics in 1637, in which Chapter 9 dealt with glasses, telescopes, and microscopes. It also includes two drawings that sketch illuminations with a Lieberkühn mirror. First for a simple microscope and a few pages later for a compound microscope. While the "compound microscopes" that are common today use an objective and an eyepiece for a "compound" magnification, simple microscopes have only a highly magnifying objective but no eyepiece. Until the 19th century, simple microscopes provided better resolution. Without the possibility of correcting chromatic aberration, the image errors of the objective and eyepiece in the compound microscope were multiplied, degrading image quality. It is believed that Descartes' drawings are drafts that were never built, as the technology during Descartes' time was considered to be not advanced enough.

Descriptions of a concave mirror for generating reflected light illumination can also be found in the works of Antoni van Leeuwenhoek, as well as in the works of Athanasius Kircher ("Ars magna lucis et umbrae", 1646).

Leeuwenhoek and Kircher used a "simple microscope" for their work. A special form of the simple microscope was the compass microscope, which was built from the end of the 17th century. Like a pair of compasses, it had two legs, the distance between which could be adjusted in fine steps. On one leg was the objective lens, and the specimen was mounted on the other. Focusing was performed by changing the distance between the legs.

Such a compass microscope was also designed and used by Johann Nathanael Lieberkühn. He equipped it with a Lieberkühn mirror, examined, among other things, the intestines of dogs, and described the crypt of Lieberkühn. In 1739 or 1740, he was able to present his development to the Royal Society in London.

In England, Lieberkühn was credited with the invention of this reflected light illumination, and corresponding devices were named after him. The earliest documented use of the term was by Benjamin Martin (1704–1782) in a microscope description from 1776 as "concave speculum or lieberkuhn". For the following 150 years, Lieberkühn reflectors were part of the standard accessories of microscopes.

But by far the most useful of Lieberkuhn's microscopes was the one for viewing opaque objects, by means of which he made so many important discoveries in the minute structure of the mucous membrane of the alimentary canal, as to immortalize his name. ... The Lieberkuhn, is that part of the instrument which is the most important, and is in general use even in the present day.

— John Quekett, 1848, A practical treatise on the use of the microscope

In German-language microscopy books from 1950 and 1957, the invention is also attributed to Lieberkühn. There are statements about reflected light illumination using a concave mirror, such as: "The first arrangement of this kind was the Lieberkühn mirror from 1738." In contrast, a book from 1988 states: "J.N. Lieberkühn introduced the concave mirror named after him for reflected light illumination in 1738, as it was used in similar form by Descartes 100 years earlier."

Lieberkühn mirrors were also used in compound microscopes over the centuries. In the early 20th century, modified Lieberkühn mirrors were also used in early fluorescence microscopes for reflected light illumination of opaque specimens. New metallic mirror surfaces reflected UV light for excitation very well, resulting in bright fluorescences.

== Images of Lieberkühn reflectors ==
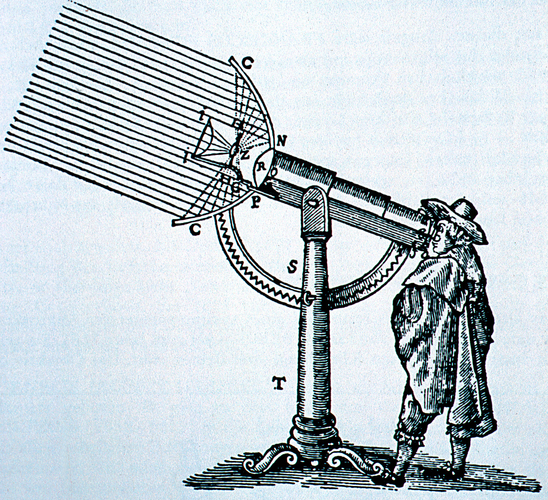
Drawing of a compound microscope by Descartes, 1637. Most of the illumination rays hit a Lieberkühn reflector, from where they are reflected onto the specimen (Z). The observer is sketched very small. Instead, only an eye could have been drawn.

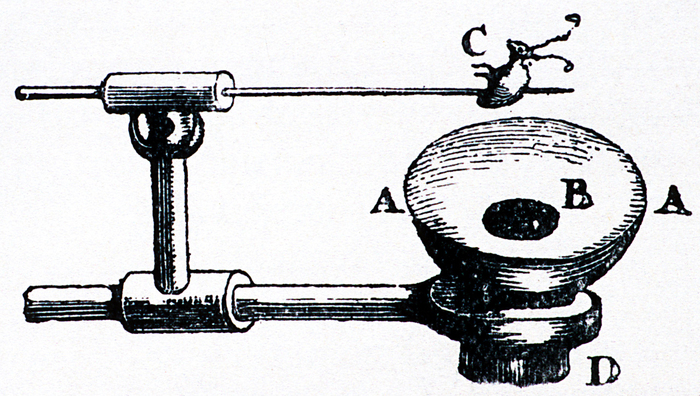
Compass microscope after Lieberkühn, circa 1740. The specimen (C) is illuminated by the concave mirror (A A) and observed through the objective (at B), with the eye positioned at (D).

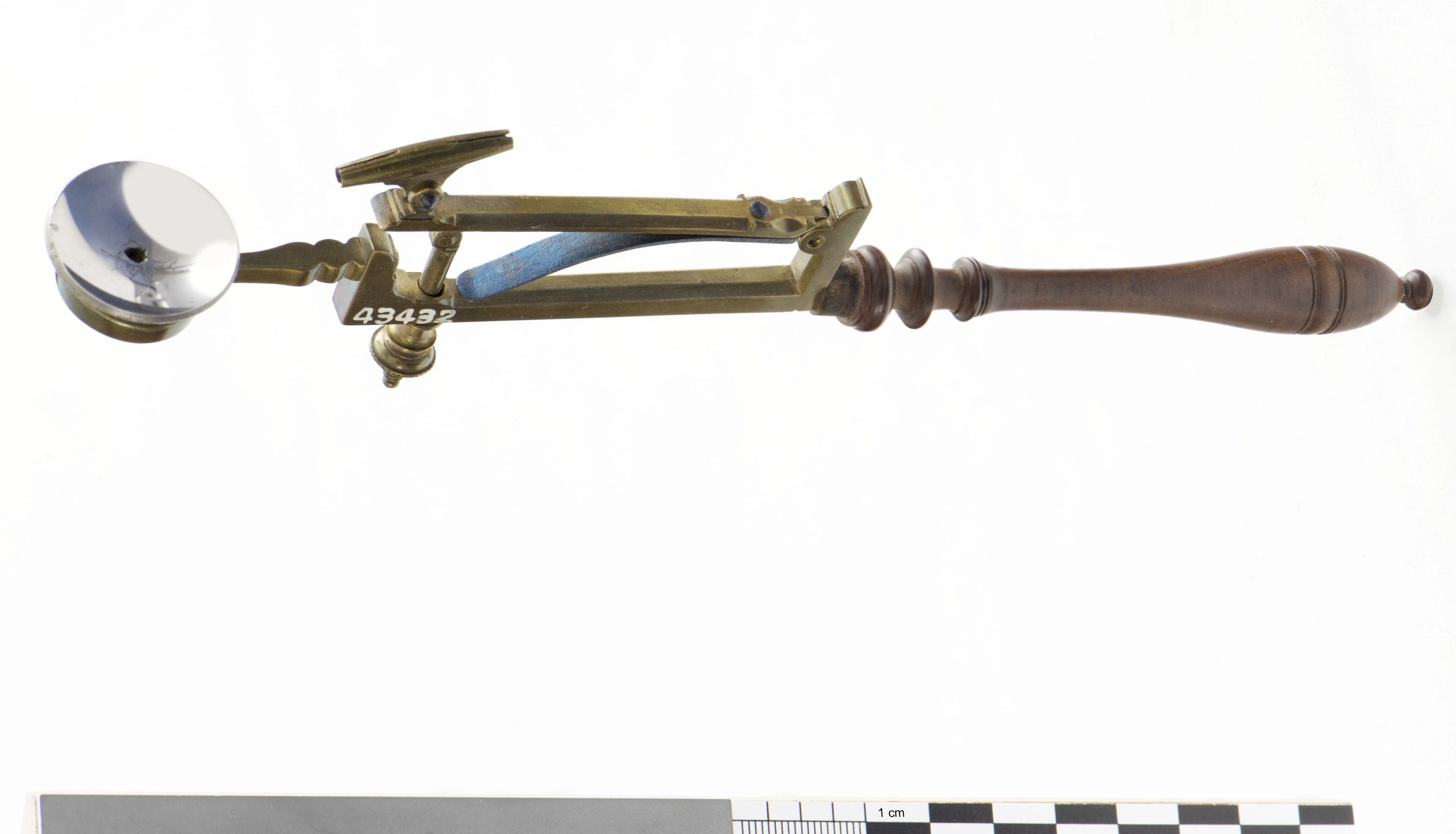
Compass microscope with Lieberkühn reflector from the first half of the 18th century, presumably by Georg Friedrich Brander. The magnifying lens is located in the hole at the center of the mirror. A needle with the specimen can be attached to the holder at the top. The distance between the two legs can be adjusted very precisely using the knurled screw.

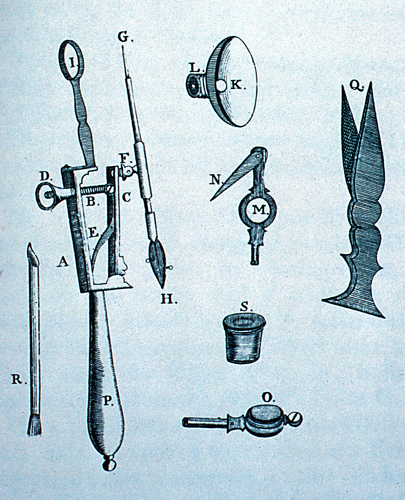
Compass microscope after Lieberkühn with accessories. The Lieberkühn reflector is in the middle at the top. Between K and L is the lens built into the mirror. The mirror is attached at I (top left).

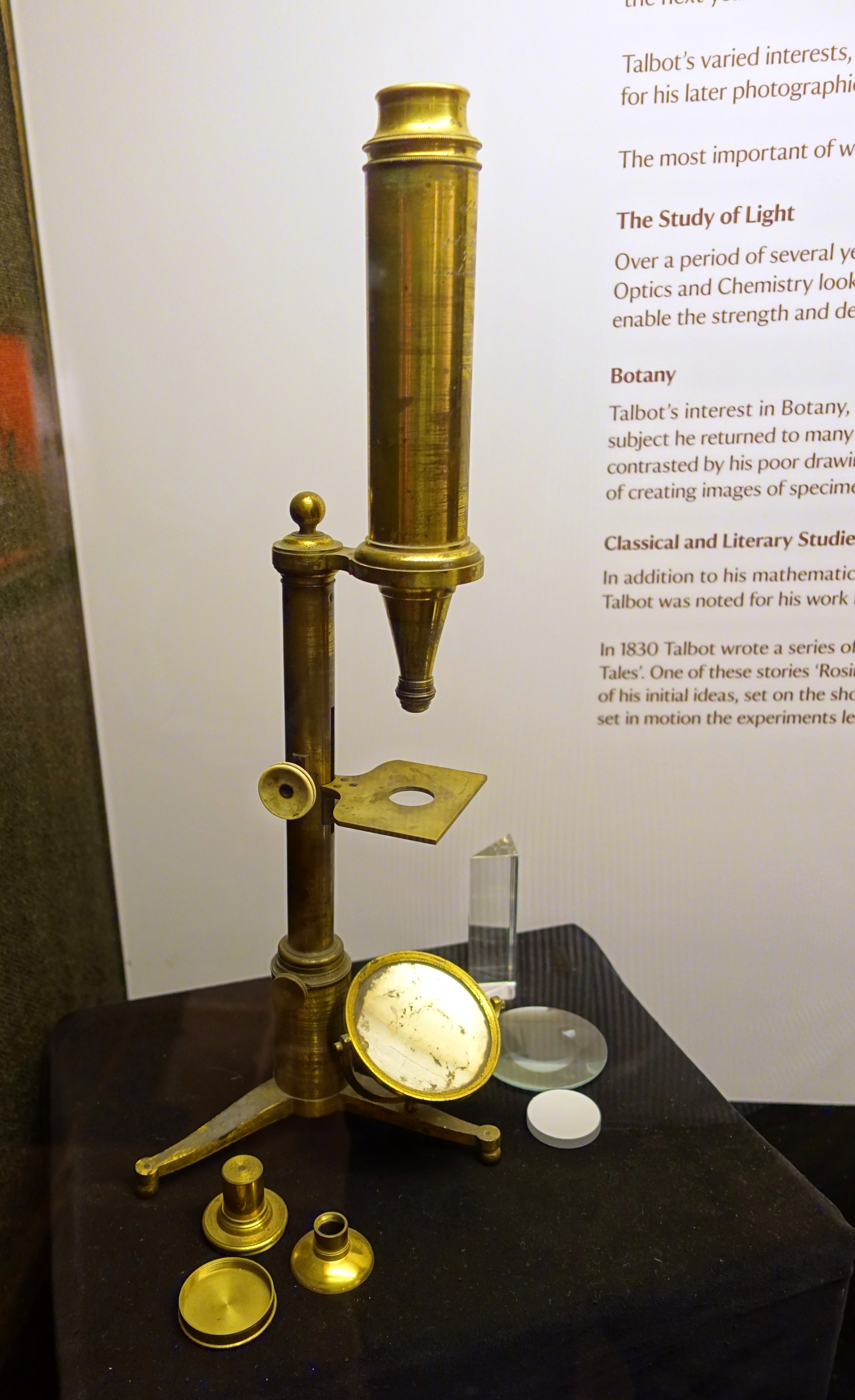
Compound microscope by Chevalier from the 19th century. Of the three accessories lying in front, the right one is a Lieberkühn reflector.

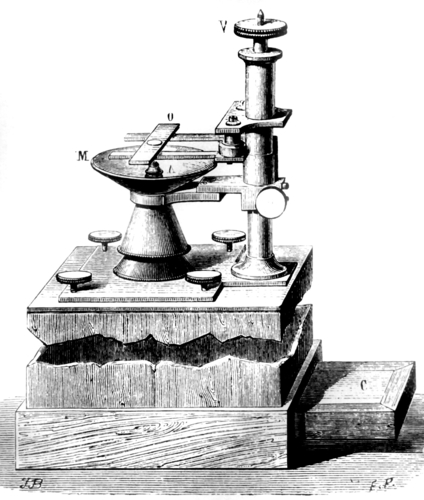
Photomicroscope by Camille Sébastien Nachet, Paris, 1863. This inverted microscope is illuminated from above. The large Lieberkühn reflector (M; «grand miroir concave de Lieberkühn») reflects light from below onto the specimen.
