= KMT2C =

Protein-coding gene in the species Homo sapiens

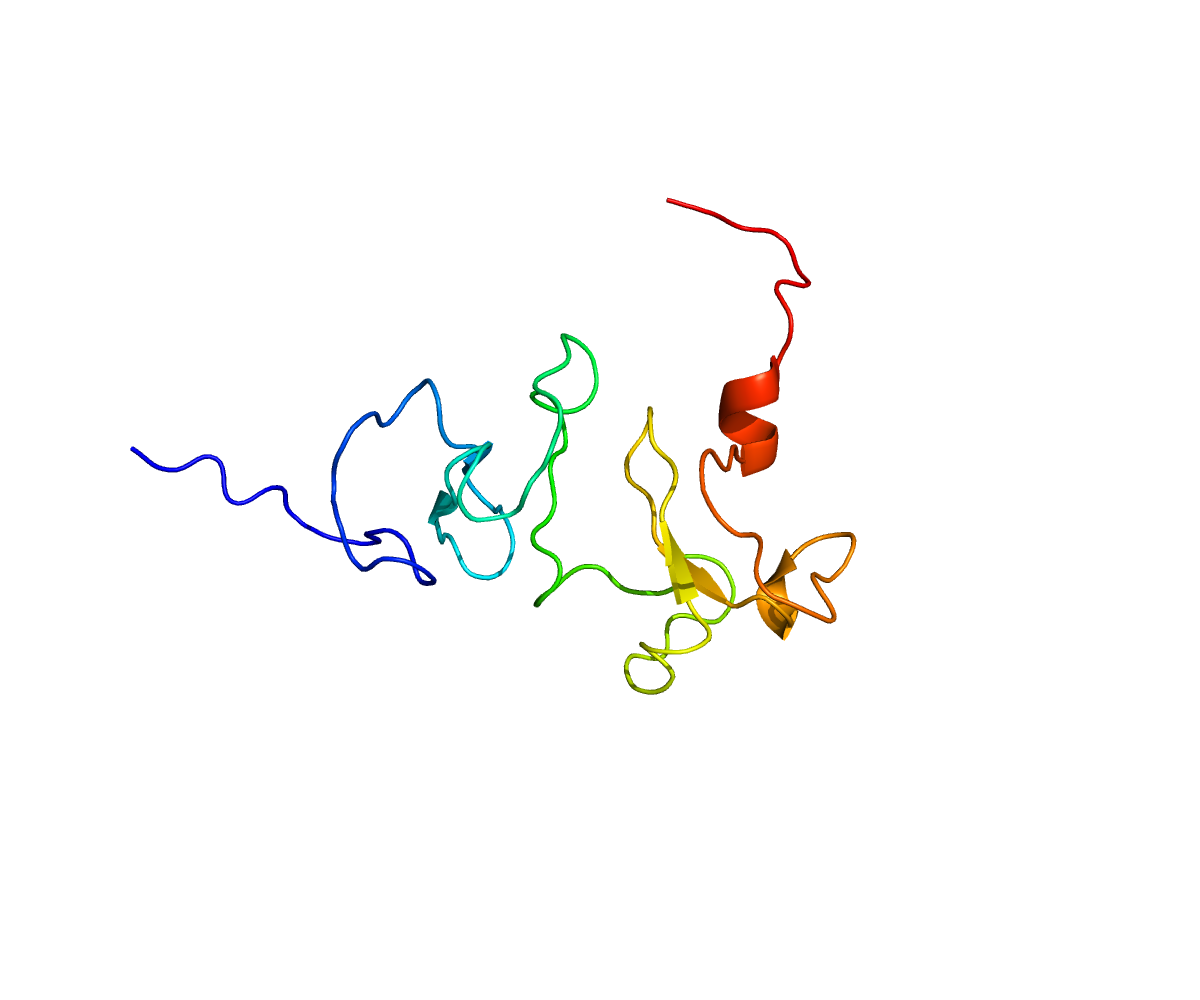

Identifiers
- Aliases: KMT2C, HALR, MLL3, lysine methyltransferase 2C, KLEFS2
- External IDs: OMIM: 606833; MGI: 2444959; GeneCards: KMT2C
Available structures
PDB	Ortholog search: PDBe RCSB
PDB	List of PDB id codes 2YSM, 2YUK, 3UVL, 4ERY, 5F59, 5F6K
Enzyme activity
EC #	BRENDA	ExPASy	KEGG	MetaCyc
2.1.1.364	↗	↗	↗	↗

Gene location (Human)
Chr.	Chromosome 7 (human)
Band	7q36.1	Start	152,134,922 bp
Band	7q36.1	End	152,436,644 bp
RNA expression pattern
Bgee	Human / Mouse (ortholog); Top expressed in: oocyte; caput epididymis; skin of arm; pancreatic epithelial cell; corpus epididymis; cardiac muscle tissue of right atrium; Achilles tendon; sural nerve; bone marrow cell; seminal vesicula / n/a; More reference expression data
BioGPS	n/a
Gene ontology
Molecular function	methyltransferase activity; transferase activity; DNA binding; protein binding; histone methyltransferase activity (H3-K4 specific); metal ion binding; acyltransferase activity; histone-lysine N-methyltransferase activity; RNA binding; transcription coactivator activity; histone binding
Cellular component	MLL3/4 complex; nucleus; nucleoplasm; histone methyltransferase complex
Biological process	histone lysine methylation; methylation; regulation of transcription, DNA-templated; transcription, DNA-templated; histone H3-K4 methylation; regulation of megakaryocyte differentiation; chromatin organization; positive regulation of transcription by RNA polymerase II
Sources:Amigo / QuickGO
Orthologs
Databases	NCBI: entry; OMA: entry
Species	Human	Mouse
Entrez	58508	231051
Ensembl	ENSG00000055609	n/a
UniProt	Q8NEZ4	Q8BRH4
RefSeq (mRNA)	NM_021230; NM_170606	NM_001081383; NM_177283
RefSeq (protein)	NP_733751	n/a
Location (UCSC)	Chr 7: 152.13 – 152.44 Mb	n/a
PubMed search
- Wikidata
View/Edit Human	View/Edit Mouse

Lysine N-methyltransferase 2C (KMT2C) also known as myeloid/lymphoid or mixed-lineage leukemia protein 3 (MLL3) is an enzyme that in humans is encoded by the KMT2C gene.

== Function ==
This gene is a member of the myeloid/lymphoid or mixed-lineage leukemia (MLL) family and encodes a nuclear protein with an AT-hook DNA-binding domain, a DHHC-type zinc finger, six PHD-type zinc fingers, a SET domain, a post-SET domain and a RING-type zinc finger. This protein is a member of the ASC-2/NCOA6 complex (ASCOM), which possesses histone methylation activity and is involved in transcriptional coactivation. Alternate transcriptional splice variants, encoding different isoforms, have been characterized.

== Interactions ==
MLL3 has been shown to interact with NCOA6 and RBBP5.

== Clinical significance ==
Mutations of the KMT2C gene cause Kleefstra syndrome-2, a neurodevelopmental disorder first described in 2012.
