= Johann Nathanael Lieberkühn =

German physician (1711–1756)

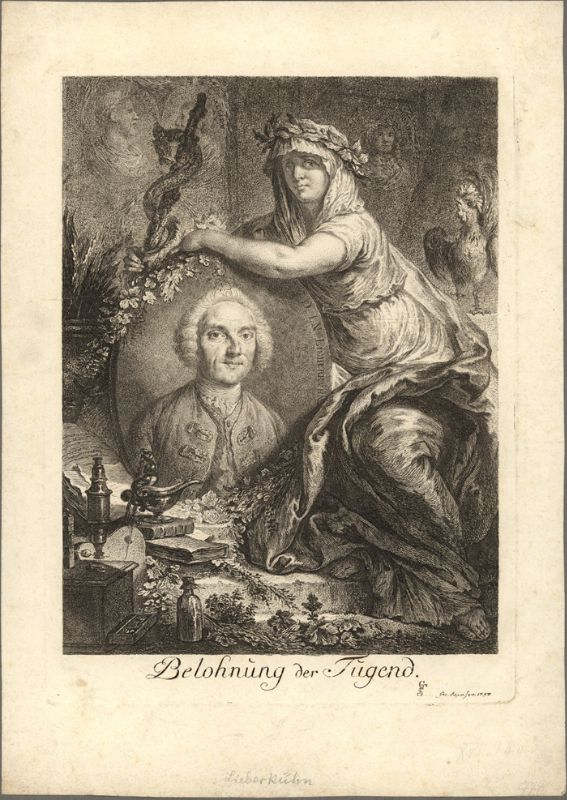
Lieberkühn’s likeness, embraced by a figure personifying virtue

Johann Nathanael Lieberkühn (5 September 1711, in Berlin – 7 October 1756, in Berlin) was a German physician. His middle name is sometimes misspelled Nathaniel.

Lieberkühn studied theology initially, and then moved to physics, in particular mechanics. It was only after this that he commenced medicine. In 1739 he moved to Leiden, in the Netherlands, and then a year later to London and Paris. Following this he returned to Berlin as a member of the Collegium medico-chirurgicum, the body charged with improving the teaching and science of medicine in the Holy Roman Empire, making mathematical and optical instruments and working as a professor and medical doctor.

Besides his physiological work, Lieberkühn was most known for his preparation of medical specimens—these were still presented up to the nineteenth century, especially in Moscow, as masterpieces. His specimens were prepared primarily with injections of wax-containing fluids into body cavities, creating relatively durable shapes. The Crypts of Lieberkühn (intestinal glands) are named for him; he first described these in detail in De fabrica et actione vollorum intestinorum tenuium hominis, in 1745. Beyond this, Lieberkühn produced optical instruments such as compass microscopes with Lieberkühn reflector, further developing the light microscope, which he had seen for the first time in Amsterdam. His custom microscopes for studying blood vessels were called "Wundergläser", ‘wonder-glasses’ by his contemporaries.

In 1755, Lieberkühn was elected a foreign member of the Royal Swedish Academy of Sciences.

== See also ==
- Crypts of Lieberkühn
