= DCLK1 =

Protein-coding gene in the species Homo sapiens

Identifiers
- Aliases: DCLK1, CL1, CLICK1, DCAMKL1, DCDC3A, DCLK, doublecortin like kinase 1
- External IDs: OMIM: 604742; MGI: 1330861; GeneCards: DCLK1
Available structures
PDB	Ortholog search: PDBe RCSB
PDB	List of PDB id codes 1MFW, 1MG4, 1UF0
Enzyme activity
EC #	BRENDA	ExPASy	KEGG	MetaCyc
2.7.11.1	↗	↗	↗	↗

Gene location (Human)
Chr.	Chromosome 13 (human)
Band	13q13.3	Start	35,768,652 bp
Band	13q13.3	End	36,131,382 bp

Gene location (Mouse)
Chr.	Chromosome 3 (mouse)
Band	3|3 C	Start	55,149,785 bp
Band	3|3 C	End	55,446,489 bp
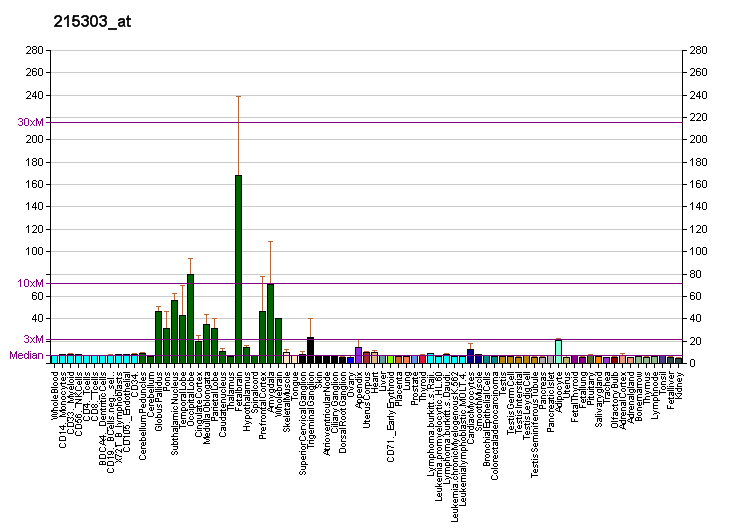

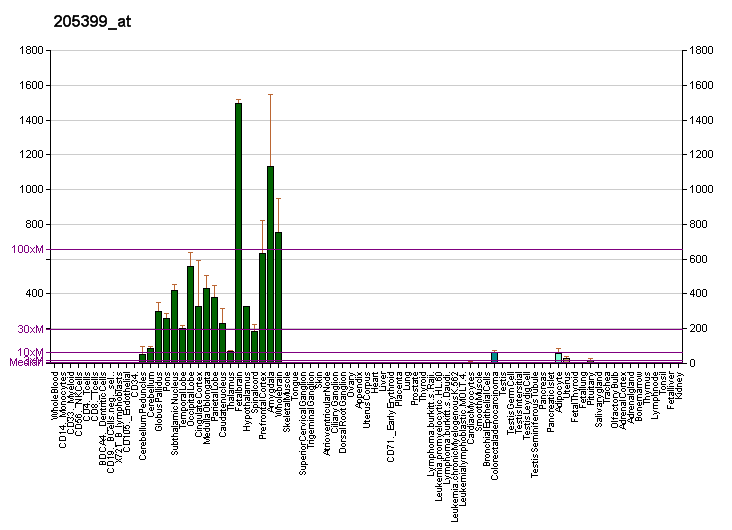
RNA expression pattern
Bgee	Human / Mouse (ortholog); Top expressed in: endothelial cell; frontal pole; Brodmann area 10; Brodmann area 23; pars reticulata; pars compacta; occipital lobe; middle temporal gyrus; superior vestibular nucleus; primary visual cortex / Top expressed in: stria vascularis; Rostral migratory stream; piriform cortex; vestibular sensory epithelium; habenula; visual cortex; superior frontal gyrus; primary visual cortex; primary motor cortex; prefrontal cortex; More reference expression data
BioGPS	More reference expression data
Gene ontology
Molecular function	transferase activity; protein kinase activity; nucleotide binding; kinase activity; ATP binding; protein serine/threonine kinase activity
Cellular component	integral component of plasma membrane; intracellular anatomical structure; postsynaptic density
Biological process	cell differentiation; axonogenesis; dendrite morphogenesis; phosphorylation; response to virus; neuron migration; nervous system development; multicellular organism development; endosomal transport; protein phosphorylation; central nervous system development; brain development; axon extension; forebrain development; central nervous system projection neuron axonogenesis; negative regulation of protein localization to nucleus; peptidyl-serine phosphorylation; peptidyl-threonine phosphorylation; intracellular signal transduction; neuron projection morphogenesis
Sources:Amigo / QuickGO
Orthologs
Databases	NCBI: entry; OMA: entry
Species	Human	Mouse
Entrez	9201	13175
Ensembl	ENSG00000133083	ENSMUSG00000027797
UniProt	O15075	Q9JLM8
RefSeq (mRNA)	NM_001195415; NM_001195416; NM_001195430; NM_004734; NM_001330071 NM_001330072	NM_001111051; NM_001111052; NM_001111053; NM_001195538; NM_001195539 NM_001195540; NM_019978; NM_001357466; NM_001357468; NM_001357469; NM_001357475; NM_001357476
RefSeq (protein)	NP_001182344; NP_001182345; NP_001182359; NP_001317000; NP_001317001 NP_004725	NP_001104521; NP_001104522; NP_001104523; NP_001182467; NP_001182468 NP_001182469; NP_064362; NP_001344395; NP_001344397; NP_001344398; NP_001344404; NP_001344405
Location (UCSC)	Chr 13: 35.77 – 36.13 Mb	Chr 3: 55.15 – 55.45 Mb
PubMed search
- Wikidata
View/Edit Human	View/Edit Mouse

Doublecortin-like kinase protein 1 (DCLK1) is an enzyme that in humans is encoded by the DCLK1 gene. Its C-terminal domain in rats is expressed independently from an alternative transcript, cpg16, and can function alone as a serine/threonine protein kinase that is cyclic AMP dependent.

DCLK1 expression is a marker for tuft cells, a type of chemosensory cell of the intestinal epithelium.
