= Tuft cell =

Chemical sensing cells in the intestinal lining

3D image of mouse jejunum tuft cells : A free-floating cryosection was immunostained with a tuft cell marker (anti-phospho-specific antibody against Girdin tyrosine-1798; pY1798 antibody from Immuno-Biological Laboratories) following an established method (Kuga D et al. Journal of Histochemistry & Cytochemistry 65(6) 347-366, Mizutani Y et al. Journal of Visualized Experiments (133) e57475). SAMPLE: Cryosectioned free-floating DDY mouse jejunum (green: phospho-Girdin at tyrosine 1798, red: phalloidin, blue: DAPI) prepared by Iida M, Tanaka M, Asai M in Institute for Developmental Research, Aichi Human Service Center (Kasugai Japan). 3D-video edited by Ito T (Nikon Instech Japan). MICROSCOPE: NIKON A1R-TiE. OBJECTIVE LENS: Plan Apo λ 60x Oil.

Tuft cells are chemosensory cells in the epithelial lining of the intestines. Similar tufted cells are found in the respiratory epithelium where they are known as brush cells. The name "tuft" refers to the brush-like microvilli projecting from the cells. Ordinarily there are very few tuft cells present but they have been shown to greatly increase at times of a parasitic infection. Several studies have proposed a role for tuft cells in defense against parasitic infection. In the intestine, tuft cells are the sole source of secreted interleukin 25 (IL-25).

ATOH1 is required for tuft cell specification but not for maintenance of a mature differentiated state, and knockdown of Notch results in increased numbers of tuft cells.

== Human tuft cells ==
The human gastrointestinal (GI) tract is full of tuft cells for its entire length. These cells were located between the crypts and villi. On the basal pole of all cells was expressed DCLK1. They did not have the same morphology as was describe in animal studies but they showed an apical brush border the same thickness. Colocalization of synaptophysin and DCLK1 were found in the duodenum, this suggests that these cells play a neuroendocrine role in this region. A specific marker of intestinal tuft cells is microtubule kinase - Double cortin-like kinase 1 (DCLK1). Tuft cells that are positive in this kinase are important in gastrointestinal chemosensation, inflammation or can make repairs after injuries in the intestine.

== Function ==
One key to understanding the role of tuft cells is that they share many characteristics with chemosensory cells in taste buds. For instance, they express many taste receptors and taste signaling apparatus. This might suggest that tuft cells could function as chemoreceptive cells that can sense many chemical signals around them. However, with more new research suggests that tuft cells can also be activated by the taste receptor apparatus. These can also be triggered by different small molecules, such as succinate and aeroallergens. Tuft cells have been known to secrete various molecules which are important for biological functions. Due to this, tuft cells act as danger sensors and trigger a secretion of biologically active mediators. Despite this, the signals and the mediators that they secrete are wholly dependent on context. For example, tuft cells that are in the urethra respond to bitter compounds, through activation of the taste receptor. This then results in a rise in intracellular Ca2+ and the release of acetylcholine. It is thought that this then triggers an activation of various other cells in the proximity which then leads to bladder detrusor reflex and a greater emptying of the bladder.

=== Tuft cells in type-2 immunity ===
It has been discovered that the tuft cells in the intestines of mice are activated by parasitic infections. This leads to a secretion of IL25. IL25, being the key activator of innate lymphoid cells type 2. This then initiates and amplifies type-2 cytokine response, characterized by secretion of cytokines from ILC2 cells. Tissue remodeling during type-2 immune response is based on cytokine interleukin (IL)-13. This interleukin is produced mainly by group 2 innate lymphoid cells (ILC2s) and type 2 helper T cells (Th2s) located in lamina propria. Also during worm infection, the amount of tuft cells dramatically rises. Hyperplasia of tuft cells and goblet cells is a hallmark of type 2 infection and is regulated by a feed-forward signalling circuit. IL-25 produced by tuft cells induces IL-13 production by ILC2s in the lamina propria. IL-13 then interact with uncommitted epithelial progenitors to affect their lineage selection toward goblet and tuft cells. As a result, the IL-13 is responsible for dramatic remodeling enterocyte epithelium to epithelium which are dominated by tuft and goblet cells. Without IL-25 from tuft cells worm clearance is delayed. The type-2 immune response is based on tuft cells and the response is severely reduced without the presence of these cells, which confirm the important physiologic function for these cells during worm infection. Activation of Th2 cells is an important part of this feed-forward loop. The activation of tuft cells in the intestine is connected with metabolite succinate, which is produced by a parasite and binds to the specific tuft cells receptor Sucnr1 on their surface. Also, the role of intestinal tuft cells can be important for local regeneration in the intestine after an infection.

== Morphology ==
Tuft cells were identified for the first time in the trachea and gastrointestinal tract in rodent, due to their typical morphology, by electron microscopy. The characteristic tubulovesicular system and apical bundle of microfilaments which are connected to tuft by long and thick microvilli, reaching into the lumen, gave them their name. This figure gave these cells their name and the whole of tufted morphology. The distribution and size of tuft cell microvilli are very different from enterocytes that neighbour them. Also tuft cells, in comparison with enterocytes, do not have a terminal web at the base of apical microvilli. Other characteristics of tuft cells are: quite narrow apical membrane which cause the tuft cells to be viewed as pinched at the top, prominent microfilaments from actin which extend to the cell and finish just above the nucleus, vast but largely empty apical vesicles which make a tubulovesicular network, on the apical side of the cells' nucleus is a Golgi apparatus, deficiency of rough endoplasmic reticulum and desmosomes with tight junction which fixes tuft cells to their neighbours. The shape of the tuft cell body varies and depends on the organ. Tuft cells in the intestine are cylindric and narrow at the apical and basal ends. Alveolar tuft cells are flatter in comparison with intestinal and gall bladder tuft cells have a cuboidal shape. Differences in tuft cells can reflect their organ's specific functions. Tuft cells express chemosensory proteins, like TRPM5 and α-gustducin. These proteins indicate that neighbouring neurons can innervate tuft cells.

Tuft cells can be identified by staining for cytokeratin 18, neurofilaments, actin filaments, acetylated tubulin, and DCLK1 to differentiate between tuft cells and enterocytes.

Tuft cells are found in the intestine, and stomach, and as pulmonary brush cells in the respiratory tract, from nose to alveoli.

== Tuft cells in disease ==
A loss of tolerance to antigens that appear in the environment cause inflammatory bowel disease (IBD) and Crohn's disease (CD) in people who are more genetically susceptible. Helminth colonization inducts a type-2 immune response, causes mucosal healing and achieves clinical remission. During an intense infection, tuft cells can make their own specification and the hyperplasia of tuft cells is a key response to the expulsion of the worm. This shows that the modulation of tuft cell function may be effective in the treatment of Crohn's Disease.

=== Helminth infections ===
Tuft cells have been shown to use taste receptors in the detection of many different helminth species. The clearance of helminth in mice that lacked taste receptor function (Trpm5 or/-gustducin KO) or enough tuft cells (Pou2f3 KO) was impaired compared to that of wild-type mice. This shows that tufts cells are important in playing a protective role during the helminth infections. It was observed that IL-25 derived from tuft cells was mediating the protective response, initiating type 2 immune responses.

== History and distribution ==
Tuft cells were first discovered in the trachea of the rat, and in the mouse stomach.

In the late 1920s, Dr. Chlopkov was tracking a project on developmental stages of goblet cells which are in the intestines. In the microscope he found a cell with a bundle of unusually long microvilli rising into the intestinal lumen. He thought he had found an early stage intestinal goblet cell but it was actually the first report of a new epithelial lineage which we now call the tuft cell. In 1956, two scientists, Rhodin and Dalhamn, described tuft cells in the rat trachea; later the same year Järvi and Keyriläinen found similar cells in the mouse stomach.

Tuft cells are generally located in the columnar epithelium organs derived from endoderm. In rodents, they have been definitively been found: for example, in the trachea, the thymus, the glandular stomach, the gall bladder, the small intestine, the colon, the auditory tube, the pancreatic duct and the urethra. Tuft cells are most of the time isolated cells and take <1% of the epithelium. In the mouse gall bladder and rat bile and pancreatic duct, the tuft cells are more abundant but still isolated.

== See also ==
- List of human cell types derived from the germ layers
