= Alan M. Krensky =

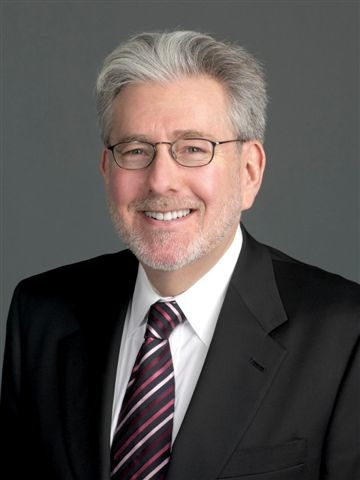
Alan M. Krensky, MD

Alan Krensky is executive for development at Northwestern Medicine and vice dean for development and alumni relations at Northwestern's Feinberg School of Medicine. He was previously senior investigator in the Laboratory of Cellular and Molecular Biology at the National Institutes of Health (NIH) and served as the first director of the Office of Portfolio Analysis and Strategic Initiatives (OPASI) and a deputy director of NIH. He was Associate Dean for Children’s Health and the Shelagh Galligan Professor of Pediatrics at Stanford University.

== Biography ==
Krensky was born in Chicago, Illinois in 1951 and attended New Trier High School (East). He received a B.A. in biology, Summa Cum Laude, and M.D. from the University of Pennsylvania. He was a Resident (medicine) and Fellow in Pediatrics at Children’s Hospital Boston and a research fellow at Dana Farber Cancer Institute, Boston. After one year on the faculty at Harvard and Boston Children’s Hospital, he moved to Stanford in 1984. He was on the faculty at Stanford for 23 years and developed the Children’s Health Initiative, a $500 million investment in research, education and clinical care, at Stanford and Lucile Packard Children's Hospital.

== Work ==
Krensky has published more than 280 papers and chapters in immunology and pediatrics, and holds 12 U.S. patents. He identified the human lymphocyte function-associated antigens 1-3, immunomodulatory HLA derived peptides (AllotrapTM), chemokine RANTES (CCL5), proinflammatory and cytotoxic molecule granulysin (GNLY) and the transcription factor Kruppel-like factor 13 (KLF13).

At NIH, Krensky oversaw the Roadmap for Medical Research (Biomedical Research), introducing new programs in Epigenomics, Human Microbiome and Transformative RO1s. Roadmap projects are designed to rapidly respond to emerging scientific opportunities and public health needs. He led the development of the [Research, Condition, and Disease Categorization (RCDC)] system, a computerized tool to permit transparent accounting of NIH funding, and a Science of Science Management effort to develop metrics for accountability in scientific progress. He co-chaired the NIH [Council of Councils], with responsibility for trans-NIH initiatives.

Krensky holds numerous awards, including the American Academy of Pediatrics Award for Excellence in Pediatric Research, E. Mead Johnson Award for Research in Pediatrics, and Novartis Established Investigator Award of the American Society of Transplantation. He served as president of the Society for Pediatric Research and secretary treasurer of the American Society of Nephrology. He is a member of the American Society for Clinical Investigation and Association of American Physicians.

== Publications ==
- Nelson PJ, Krensky AM: Chemokines, chemokine receptors, and allograft rejection. Immunity 2001; 14: 377-386.
- Spada FM, Grant EP, Peters PJ, Sugita M, Melian A, Leslie DS, Lee HK, van Donselaar E, Hanson DA, Krensky AM, Majdic O, Porcelli SA, Morita CT, Brenner MB: Self recognition of CD1 by γδ T cells: implications for innate immunity. J. Exp. Med. 2000; 191: 937-948.
- Stenger S, Hanson DA, Teitlebaum R, Dewan P, Niazi KR, Froelich CJ, Ganz T, Thoma-Uszynski S, Melian A, Bogdan C, Porcelli SA, Bloom BR, Krensky AM, Modlin RL: An antimicrobial activity of cytolytic T cells mediated by granulysin. Science 1998; 282: 121-125.
- Pena SV, Krensky AM: Granulysin, a new human cytolytic granule associated protein with possible involvement in cell-mediated cytotoxicity. Sem. Immunol. 1997; 9:117-125.
- Nelson EL, Li XB, Hsu FJ, Kwak LW, Levy R, Clayberger C, Krensky AM: Tumor specific cytotoxic T lymphocyte response after idiotypevaccination for B cell, Non-Hodgkin’s lymphoma. Blood. 1996; 88:580-589.
- Pattison J, Nelson PJ, Huie P, von Luettichau I, Farshid G, Sibley RK, Krensky AM: RANTES chemokine expression in cell mediated transplant rejection of the kidney. Lancet. 1994; 343: 209-211.
- Krensky AM, Weiss A, Crabtree G, Davis M, Parham P: Mechanisms of disease: T lymphocyte - antigen interactions in transplant rejection. N. Engl. J. Med. 1990; 322: 510-517.
- Salter RD, Benjamin RJ, Wesley PK, Buxton S, Garrett TPJ, Clayberger C, Krensky AM, Norment AM, Littman DR, Parham P: A binding site for the T cell co-receptor, CD8, on the alpha3 domain of HLA-A2. Nature. 1990; 345: 41-46.
- Salter RD, Norment AM, Chen BP, Clayberger C, Krensky AM, Littman DR, and Parham P: Polymorphism in the alpha3 domain of HLA-A molecules affects binding to CD8. Nature. 1989; 338: 345-347.
- Krensky AM, Robbins E, Springer TA, and Burakoff SJ: LFA-1, LFA-2, and LFA-3 antigens are involved in CTL-target conjugation. J. Immunol. 1984; 132: 2180-2182.
- Krensky AM, Sanchez-Madrid F, Robbins E, Nagy J, Springer TA, Burakoff SJ: The functional significance, distribution and structure of LFA-1, LFA-2, and LFA-3: Cell surface antigens associated with the CTL-target interactions. J. Immunol. 1983; 131: 611-616.
- Pober JS, Collins T, Gimbrone MA, Cotran RS, Gitlin J, Fiers W, Clayberger C, Krensky AM, Burakoff SJ, Reiss CS: Lymphocytes recognize human vascular endothelial and dermal fibroblast Ia antigens induced by recombinant immune interferon. Nature 1983; 305: 726-729.
- Sanchez-Madrid F, Krensky AM, Ware CF, Robbins E, Strominger JL, Burakoff SJ, Springer TA: Three distinct antigens associated with human T-lymphocyte-mediated cytolysis: LFA-1, LFA-2 (CD2), and LFA-3 (CD58). Proc. Natl. Acad. Sci. USA 1982; 79: 7489-7493.
