= TEX9 =

Protein-coding gene in the species Homo sapiens

Identifiers
- Aliases: TEX9, testis expressed 9
- External IDs: MGI: 1201610; GeneCards: TEX9

Gene location (Human)
Chr.	Chromosome 15 (human)
Band	15q21.3	Start	56,244,009 bp
Band	15q21.3	End	56,445,997 bp

Gene location (Mouse)
Chr.	Chromosome 9 (mouse)
Band	9|9 D	Start	72,450,394 bp
Band	9|9 D	End	72,492,212 bp
RNA expression pattern
Bgee	Human / Mouse (ortholog); Top expressed in: Achilles tendon; right uterine tube; bronchial epithelial cell; olfactory zone of nasal mucosa; gonad; testicle; ventricular zone; oocyte; anterior pituitary; mucosa of paranasal sinus / Top expressed in: genital tubercle; tail of embryo; spermatocyte; neural layer of retina; ventricular zone; embryo; seminiferous tubule; spermatid; lens; medullary collecting duct; More reference expression data
BioGPS	n/a
Orthologs
Databases	NCBI: entry; OMA: entry
Species	Human	Mouse
Entrez	374618	21778
Ensembl	ENSG00000151575	ENSMUSG00000090626
UniProt	Q8N6V9	Q9D845
RefSeq (mRNA)	NM_001286449; NM_198524	NM_009359
RefSeq (protein)	NP_001273378; NP_940926	NP_033385
Location (UCSC)	Chr 15: 56.24 – 56.45 Mb	Chr 9: 72.45 – 72.49 Mb
PubMed search
- Wikidata
View/Edit Human	View/Edit Mouse

Testis-expressed protein 9 is a protein that in humans is encoded the TEX9 gene. TEX9 that encodes a 391-long amino acid protein containing two coiled-coil regions. The gene is conserved in many species and encodes orthologous proteins in eukarya, archaea, and one species of bacteria. The function of TEX9 is not yet fully understood, but it is suggested to have ATP-binding capabilities.

== Gene ==
=== Locus ===
TEX9 is located at 15q21.3 and has 18 exons. However, some exons overlap; therefore, there are only 13 distinguishable exons in the human genome. TEX9 is on the sense strand and spans from base 56,365,573 to 56,428,441. TEX9 is located in the gene neighborhood of CD24P2, RFX7, MNS1, and HMGB1P33.

=== Transcription Regulation ===
The promoter for TEX9 was determined using 19 supporting transcripts to be GXP_7531542, spanning from base 56,364,254 to base 56,365,775 on the sense strand of chromosome 15. A number of transcription factors with a matrix similarity greater than or equal to 0.780 that are predicted to regulate transcription of TEX9 are listed below with their respective binding site:

Transcription factor	Binding Site	Strand
Estrogen response elements (ER alpha)	ATTGGTCAGGCTGGTCTTG	+
Retinoid receptor-related testis-associated receptor	CCGACCAGAACTTGAGGGT and TTGTAATTCAAGGTCATAA	− and +
Hypermethylated in cancer 1	CTCTGCCCAGCCT and CTTCACCCGTGAT	+ and −
T-box TF TBX21, dimeric binding site	TACTGCTTTTGGTGTCATATCTAAG	+
Sine oculis homeobox homolog 4	CTTTTGGTGTCATAT	+
Ecotropic viral integration site 1 encoded factor, amino-terminal zinc finger domain	AAAACCACAGTATAGAT	−
Estrogen-related receptor alpha	GAATTGTAATTCAAGGTCATAAA and AGTGATTTGCCCAAGG/CCATATA	+ and +
Regulatory factor X, 4	TTAGGTCTTTGATACATT and AGCCATTGGCGCAGCGTCA	+ and −
Thyroid hormone receptor, beta	TCGAGGATTCAAATCCAGAAACT and CTGGTATGTAGTATAGTGCCA	− and −
Homeodomain protein NKX3.2	ACTGTGAAGTGGGCACTAT	+
Lentivirus LTR TATA box	CCATATAACTGGTAAGT	+
Cdx-2 mammalian caudal related intestinal TF	GTTCCGGTATATTGACCAT	−
GA binding protein TF, alpha	CTCTCGCGGGAAGATGCGTCG	+
Olfactory neuron-specific factor	ACCTTTGAGAGCGCCCTTCTACG	−
Kidney-enriched kruppel-like factor	GAAGATGGCGGGGCGAAGT	+

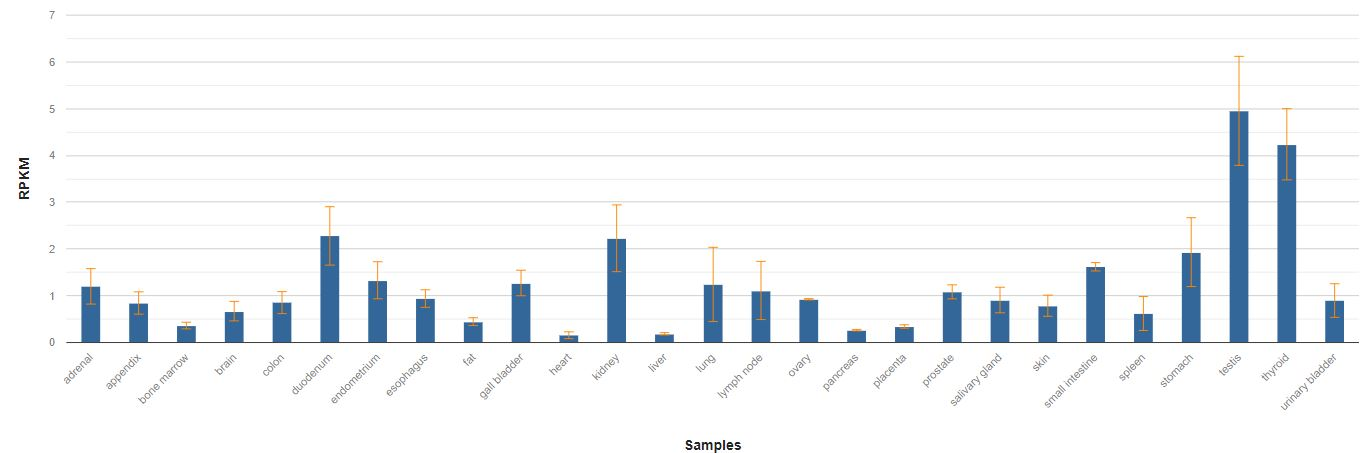
Expression of TEX9 in human tissue samples

=== Expression ===
The expression of TEX9 is highest in the testis, followed by the thyroid, duodenum, and kidney, although other tissues have been shown to express TEX9. TEX9 is expected to have a subcellular localization in the cytoplasm or nucleus.

== mRNA ==
=== Characteristics of Isoform 1 ===
Isoform 1 of TEX9 has a 5' UTR region of 27 base pairs and a 3' UTR region of 356 base pairs. The transcript is 1,559 base pairs long.

=== Additional Primary Sequence and Variants (Isoforms) ===
Less common isoforms of TEX9 include isoforms: 2, X1, X2, X3, X4, X5, and X6.

== Protein ==
The theoretical molecular weight of the 391 amino acid TEX9 protein is 45kDa and the theoretical pI is 6. However, the experimental molecular weight has been shown to be ~55kDa.

=== Domains, Motifs, and Secondary Structure ===
The most pronounced domains in TEX9 are the two coiled-coil regions, which include amino acids 32-59 and 194-351. Repetitive domains within the protein include ALEE (34-37 and 302-305) and EKYK (251-254 and 307-310). TEX9 has more glutamate, lysine, and glutamine residues and less glycine residues compared to a typical human protein.

=== Post-translational Modifications ===
TEX9 has been shown to be phosphorylated at tyrosine (Y) residues 85 and 264, and have a ubiquitylation site at the lysine (K) residue at 159. It is predicted that there are multiple other phosphorylation, glycation, 0-beta-GlcNAc, and SUMO protein attachment sites.

=== Tertiary Structure ===
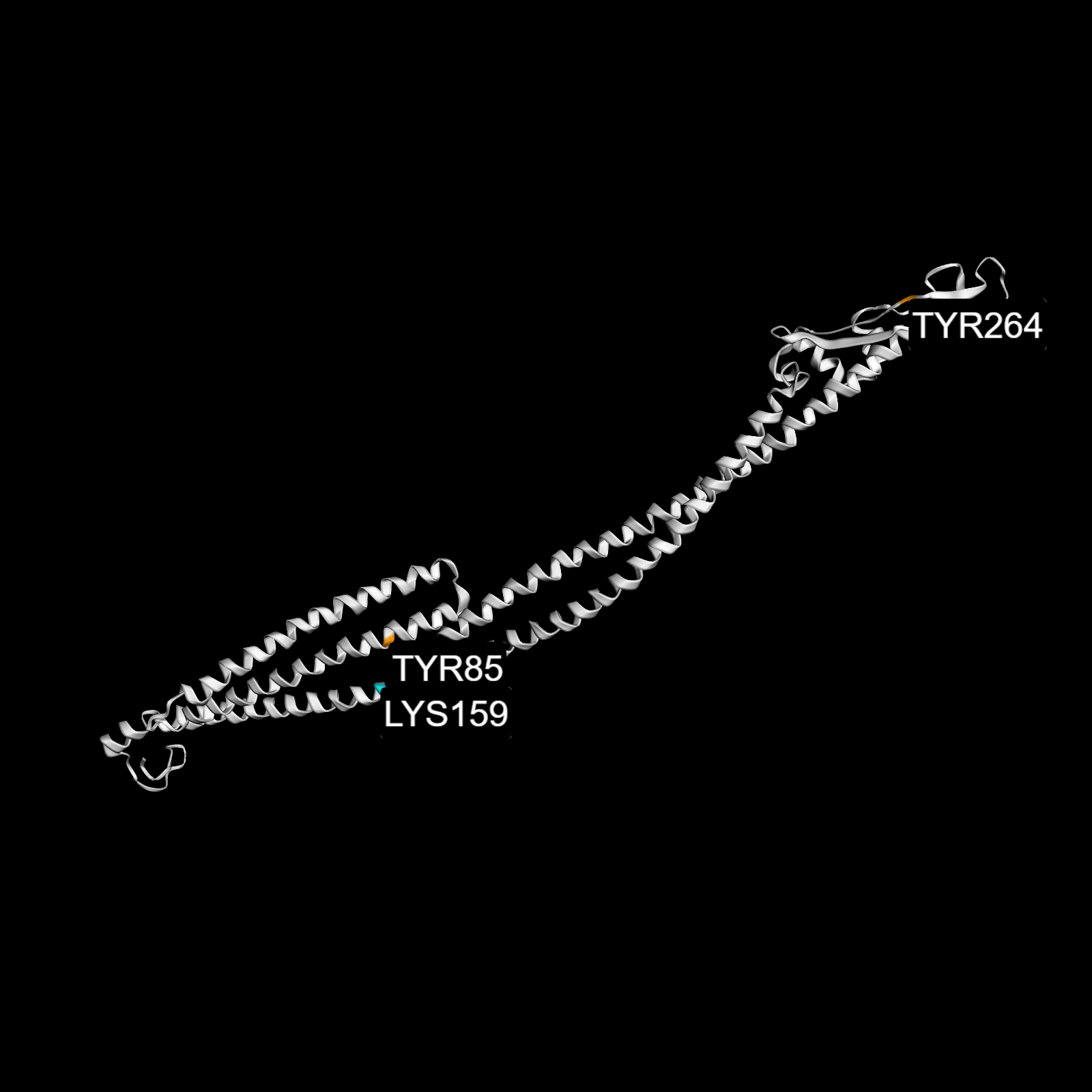
TEX9 isoform 1 with phosphorylation (orange) and ubiquitylation (blue) sites. The structure has 99% confidence and 98% coverage.

TEX9's two coiled-coil regions make up its tertiary structure and can be visualized using the predicted structure from Phyre2. Shown on the structure are the two known phosphorylated sites and one ubiquitylation site.

=== Quaternary Structure and Protein Interactions ===
TEX9 has been experimentally determined to have interactions including coiled-coil containing 112 (CCDC112), chromosome 20 open reading frame 112 (C20orf112), and nucleolar protein 4 (NOL4). Textmining has suggested that TEX9 also interacts with olfactory receptor, family 4, subfamily C, member 3, odorant receptor (OR4C3). Other interactions include gene products of human genes NOL4-2 (at an unknown location), GOGA2 (in the cis-Golgi network membrane, spindle pole of cytoskeleton, and ER-Golgi intermediate compartment membrane), and KDM1A (in the nucleus). Another proposed interaction between TEX9 involves attachment with the SUMO protein, which has a molecular weight of 11kDa. The realized MW of TEX9 is 55kDa but the theoretical MW is 45kDa, which provides evidence for this interaction.

== Homology and Evolution ==
=== Paralogs ===
There are no paralogs of TEX9 in humans.

=== Orthologs ===
TEX9 has homologs in over 260 other organisms, including vertebrates, invertebrates, archaea, and one species of bacteria. TEX9 has been found in all clades of organisms except land plants.

Genus species	Common name	Taxonomic group	Divergence (MYA)	Accession number	Seq. Length (aa)	Corr. ID to HP (%)	Corr. Sim. To HP (%)
Homo sapiens	Human	Hominini	0	NP_940926.1	391	100	100
Pan paniscus	Bonobo	Primate	6.65	XP_008951441.1	391	99	99
Loxodonta africana	African bush/savanna elephant	Mammal	105	XP_010596294.1	391	83	90
Apteryx rowi	Okarito (brown) kiwi	Bird	312	XP_025916696.1	422	61	74
Gekko japonicus	Calling gecko	Reptile	312	XP_015264647.1	359	49	63
Xenopus laevis	African clawed frog	Amphibian	352	XP_018108534.1	434	60	76
Astyanax mexicanus	Mexican tetra/blind cave fish	Bony fish	432	XP_007244936.2	394	51	68
Apostichopus japonicus	Japanese (spiky) sea cucumber	Echinodermata	684	PIK45906.1	404	43	56
Capitella teleta	Capitella	Annelida	797	ELT92672.1	257	34	45
Anoplophora glabripennis	Asian long-horned beetle	Mollusca	797	XP_018561745.1	259	18	31
Pocillopora damicornis	Cauliflower (lace) coral	Cnidaria	824	XP_027039795.1	387	42	60
Clonorchis sinensis	Chinese liver fluke	Platyhelminthes	824	RJW72461.1	952	27	41
Echinococcus multilocularis	Echinococcus	Platyhelminthes	824	CDS43228.1	299	18	33
Trichoplax sp. H2	Trichoplax	Placozoa	948	RDD37208.1	451	30	44
Amphimedon queenslandica	Amphimedon	Porifera	951.8	XP_003384031.2	339	27	41
Spizellomyces punctatus DAOM BR117	Spizellomyces	Chytrid (fungi)	1105	XP_016611327.1	373	31	52
Planoprotostelium fungivorum	Planoprotostelium	Amoebozoa (protist)	1480	PRP73397.1	373	12	18
Klebsormidium nitens	Klebsormidium	Charophyte (green algae)	1496	GAQ91967.1	345	29	45
Hondaea fermentalgiana	Hondaea	Stramenopiles (protist)	1768	GBG25987.1	379	22	35
Thecamonas trahens ATCC 50062	Thecamonas	Apusozoa (protist)	2101	XP_013753981.1	324	13	23
Chlamydia trachomatis	Chlamydia	Bacteria	4290	CPS19605.1	72	14	14

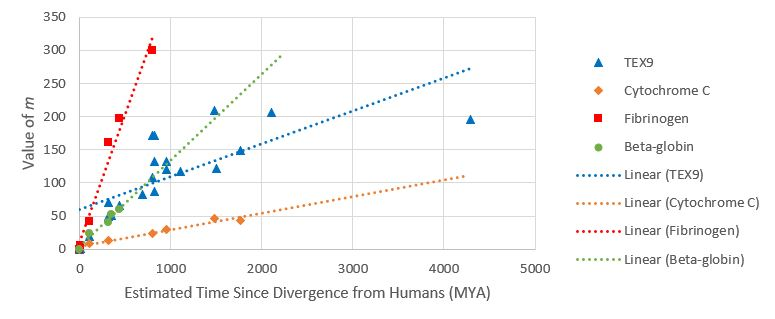
TEX9's mutation rate compared to fibrinogen, beta-globin, and cytochrome c.

The relative rate of change for TEX9 is fairly slow compared to fibrinogen and beta-globin, but not as slow as cytochrome c.

=== Homologous Domains ===
TEX9 sequences that are most conserved between humans and other organisms are found within the two coiled-coil regions, where some amino acids are conserved in vertebrates, invertebrates, and microorganisms. The bacterial ortholog is most similar to vertebrates than invertebrates or microorganisms.

=== Phylogeny ===
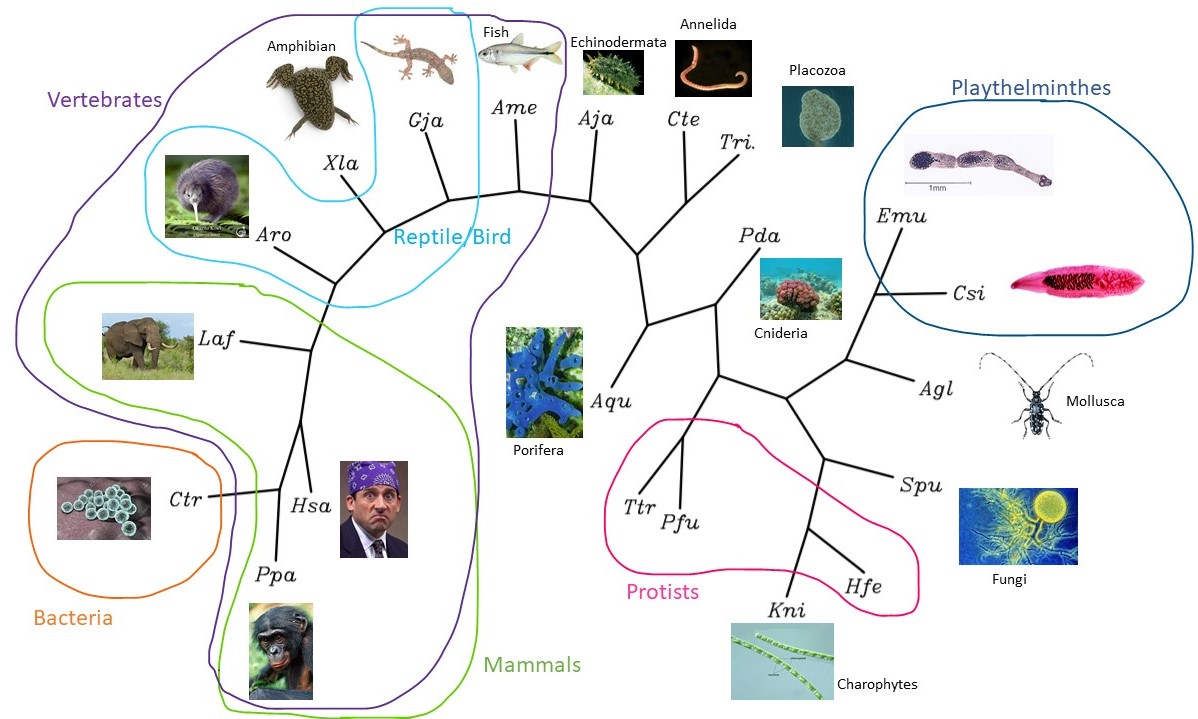
Unrooted phylogenetic tree of TEX9 orthologs. Branch length represents relative evolutionary distance between organisms.

All of the orthologs of TEX9 are derived from the same common ancestor except the gene found in Chlamydia, which is thought to have transferred from humans into the bacterium.

== Clinical significance ==
=== Pathology ===
No diseases have been shown to be directly linked to TEX9, but some correlations have been found regarding estrogen receptor knockdown and increased TEX9 expression as well as colorectal cancer cells with decreased TEX9 expression.

=== Disease Association ===
Reduced expression of TEX9 has been shown to boost tumor growth in immunocompetent mice but not in immunocompromised mice. This result suggested that TEX9 may function as a tumor antigen in some tumors. Mutations of the TEX9 protein have been found in 1-2% of tumors taken from certain cancers, including endometrial, head and neck, colorectal, and squamous lung.
