= LFA =

LFA may refer to:

== Organizations ==
- La France Audacieuse, political party in France
- Ladies Football Association, multiple organizations
- Lake Forest Academy, a school in the US
- Lebanese Football Association
- Legacy Fighting Alliance, a US-based mixed martial arts organization
- Leinster Football Association, Ireland
- Liberia Football Association
- Liga de Fútbol Americano Profesional, the top American football league in Mexico
- Liga Futbolu Amerykańskiego, the top American football league in Poland
- Little Flower Academy, a school in Canada
- Local franchise authority, a US local government organization
- Lolland-Falster Alliancen, former name of a Danish football club
- London Football Association
- Lupus Foundation of America
- Lycée Franco-Allemand
- Lycée Français d'Agadir
- Lycée Français d'Amman

== Science and technology ==
- Laser flash analysis, a technique for measurement of thermal diffusivity
- Lateral flow assay, the principle behind immunochromatographic rapid tests
- Lorentz Force Accelerator, another name for a magnetoplasmadynamic thruster
- Low-functioning autism, a classification of autism
- Lunar Flag Assembly
- Lymphocyte function-associated antigen (disambiguation), (LFA-1, 2, and 3) several cell adhesion molecules

== Other uses ==
- Lexus LFA, a two-seat sports car
- Logical framework approach
- Luftfahrtforschungsanstalt (Aeronautical Research Institute), a secret German facility for airframe, aeroengine, and aircraft weapons testing during the Second World War
- Langfang railway station, China Railway pinyin code LFA

== See also ==
- IFA (disambiguation)
- WFA (disambiguation), for topics 'Women's FA' instead of 'Ladies' FA'
