= WCFL =

WCFL may refer to:

== Current uses ==
- WCFL (FM), a radio station (104.7 FM) licensed to Morris, Illinois, United States from 1990 to present

== Past uses ==
- WCFL-FM (104.3 FM), a radio station licensed to Chicago, Illinois, from 1948 to January 1950
- Wilmington City Football League, a semi-professional American football league from 1932 to 1935
- WMVP, a radio station (1000 AM) licensed to Chicago, Illinois, which held the call sign WCFL from June 1926 to May 1987
