= Delaware football =

Delaware football may refer to:

- Delaware Fightin' Blue Hens football, a college football team
- Delaware Panthers, a semi-pro team from 1932–1933
- Delaware State Hornets football, a college football team
