= WFA =

WFA may refer to:

== Awards ==
- Woodie Flowers Award, for robotics mentorship
- World Fantasy Award, in literature

== Organizations ==
- Wellington Free Ambulance, New Zealand
- Western Finance Association, a learned society
- Western Front Association, a historical society
- Wi-Fi Alliance, a hardware trade group
- World Federation of Advertisers, a marketing trade group
- World Federalist Association (now Citizens for Global Solutions), an American peace campaign

== Sport ==
=== American football ===
- Women's Football Alliance (formed 2009)
- Women's Football Association (2002–03)
- Wilmington Football Association (1929–1955)

=== Other sports ===
- Weight for Age, in horse racing
- Western Football Association, Ontario, Canada (1880–1940)
- Women's Football Association, England (1969–1993)
- World Fighting Alliance, in mixed martial arts (2001–2006)

== Other uses ==
- Wilderness first aid, a paramedicine course
- Work from anywhere, a form of telecommuting

== See also ==
- LFA (disambiguation), for topics 'Ladies FA' instead of 'Women's FA'
