= Seventh Ward Chicks =

General information
- Founded: 1922
- Folded: 1923
- Headquartered: Delaware

League / conference affiliations
- Wilmington Football Association (1922)

The Seventh Ward Chicks were a short-lived semi-professional American football team that played one season in the Wilmington Football Association. A charter member of the league, they played for one year in 1922 before folding the following season. The team was managed by Herb Ferguson.

== History ==
The team was founded in 1922, and held its first practice on September 26. Every Evening reported, "Seventh Ward "Chicks" he'd a good practice last evening at which 40 candidates were present. The Chicks are prepared for the first battle when the Wilmington Football Association season opens. Manager Ferguson has a bright outlook for the Chicks this season. All uniforms have been ordered and will be ready on Thursday evening at which time a practice and stilt scrimmage will be held. All candidates are requested to report at the club room, 1705 Lincoln street, at 6.30 o'clock on Thursday evening." The team joined the Wilmington Football Association at their founding, and were one of four charter members. Other league teams included the Defiance Bulldogs, St. Mary's Cats, and Parkside.

The Chicks played their first game against the Defiance Bulldogs, and were shutout 0–13. A game recap by The Morning News wrote, "Despite the midsummer temperature Saturday afternoon, Defiance and Seventh Ward battled in top form in the opening encounter of the Wilmington Football Association at Rockford Tower the Bulldogs defeating the Ferguson, combine, 13 to 0. More than a thousand lovers of the strenuous fan sport turned out to see the game. The bulldogs sent their first touchdown over in the first quarter. Walsh took Fegley's kick-o: on the 30-yard line and brought the pigskin back 25 yards before being downed. Steady backfield plunges and end runs brought the ball to the 20-yard line where Quinn fumbled the Seventh Warders taking possession of the ball. The Bulldogs defenset proved impregnable, forcing Fegley to kick, Gillespie taking his part on the 0-yard line. Walsh went around left end for 15 yards while a mixture of line plunges by Gillespie, Filliben and Quinn soon had the bail on the 3-yard line. Fllliben went over for the first touchdown of the 1922 season. Gillespie kicked the goal, the placement kick being used. Gillespie and Walsh featured for Defiance, both getting away with several excellent runs. Walsh also ran the team in an excellent manner. Jestwick and Hagan also played a clever game. Ross played a good defensive game for the "Chicks"; Buckley's run for 80 yards after catching a forward featured. Ferguson and Casey did most of the gaining for Seventh Ward."

Following the loss the Chicks acquired several new players and "expect[ed] to turn in a win over Parkside". Seventh Ward lost the game by forfeit, putting them last in league standings.The Evening Journal reported, "Officials In charge of the Parkside-Seventh Ward game, scheduled for Rockford Tower, awarded the contest to Parkside, 1 to 0, on account of the non-appearance of Seventh Ward, in accordance with rule 18 of the Association. Manager Evans of the Kirkwood Park aggregation said he stood for the ruling of the officials in his report of the affair to the president of the Association on Saturday night. Referee Doherty in charge of the game reported that he had conferred with the other officials, Umpire Prettyman and Linesman Whitehead, and it was their unanimous opinion that the game be forfeited to Parkside in accordance with the rules of the Association. On the other hand it Is reported a phone call at the Seventh Ward Club Saturday afternoon prevented the Seventh Ward team from taking the field at Rockford Tower in the scheduled game. Shortly before 2.30 the Seventh Warders claim they received a call from someone stating he was William Lewis, president of the Parkside club and that Manager Evans wished to call the game on account of rain. Manager Ferguson consulted his players and agreed to postpone the game. Parkside, however, was on the field waiting for Seventh Ward, and the game was forfeited to the east siders by the officials."

The team's next scheduled opponent was the St. Mary's Cats, at Fourth & Church streets. A game preview by The Evening Journal wrote, "Seventh Ward and St. Mary hook up In the lone battle booked for tomorrow in the Wilmington Football Association at Fourth and Church streets. It will be the opening home game of the grid season for the Cats and a large crowd is expected to greet the popular east siders on their field. The brisking up of the atmosphere the past few day has put snap in the practices of the elevens in preparation for the game and has also snapped up the Interest of the fans. The Cats and Chicks should provide one of those old time struggles of the gridiron with both battling for the points which will lift them out of the cellar station."

The Chicks tied the game, 6–6. A recap by The Evening Journal wrote, "Seventh Ward and St. Mary battled to a single touchdown draw, 6-6, in Saturday's Wilmington Football Association game at Fourth and Church streets. Both teams fought hard for the victory and provided the large crowd of fans with a better brand of football than they exhibited in their previous games. The Cast climbed to a lead in the opening period, when they rushed over for a touchdown, but missed the try for the extra point. This looked like it might be the margin of advantage for the Chicks when the evened the count on a brilliantly executed forward, but the Forty Acreites also failed in the attempt for the extra point. Fumbles ruined two apparent chances for the Saints to score in the second and third quarters."

They spent the following weeks on bye, before losing 6–18 against Parkside in early-November. The Morning News reported, "Seventh Ward was easy for Parkside on Saturday in an Association League game, the East Side eleven winning easily 18 to 6. Parkside made seven first downs after receiving the kick-off at the opening of the game, only to loss the ball with half a yard to go for another first down on the 10-yard line. But the East Siders were not to be denied a score, for Loose intercepted a forward pass, and with almost perfect interference ran forty yards for the first touchdown. At the beginning of the second quarter terrific line plunges by McCulllon, Loose and Volkman scored another for the Black and White. Seventh Ward introduced a colored player into Wilmington football circles. Perry by name, and from advanced reports he was heralded as another West, but he failed to show anything startling, although he did take the ball over for the West Side team from the 8-yard line, where it was brought by Seventh Ward, due to a forward pass." The Chicks lost their final game against the Defiance Bulldogs, 0–78 in what was called a "local football record".

The Chicks folded following the season.
