= Women's Football Association (disambiguation) =

Women's Football Association may refer to:

== Soccer ==
- Women's Football Association (1969–1993), England, UK
- Women's Football Association of Indonesia (ASBWI; est. 2017; Indonesian: Asosiasi Sepak Bola Wanita Indonesia)
- Women's Football Association of the Lviv Oblast, Ukraine; founded in 2010 by Iryna Vanat
- National Women's Football Association, Malawi; see Malawi Women's League
- Urban Women's Football Association in Lubumbashi, Democratic Republic of Congo; see DR Congo women's football championship
- Jamaican Women's Football Association (est. 1987), see Jamaica women's national football team
- Japan University Women's Football Association; in college soccer
- Northern Ireland Women's Football Association (NIWFA; est. 1977), Northern Ireland, UK
- Scottish Women’s Football Association (est. 1972), Scotland, UK
- Uganda Women's Football Association (UWFA), see Federation of Uganda Football Associations

== Other ==
- Women's Football Association (2002–03), USA; in American Football
- National Women's Football Association (2000–2008), USA; in American football

== See also ==
- Ladies Football Association (disambiguation)
- Sports league
- Sports federation
- Football association
- Women's American football
- Women's association football
- Women's Australian rules football
