= Fifth Ward Democrats =

General information
- Founded: September 1933
- Folded: November 1933
- Headquartered: Delaware

League / conference affiliations
- Wilmington Football Association (1933)

The Fifth Ward Democrats were a short-lived semi-professional American football team that played one season in the Wilmington Football Association. The team played five games before forfeiting their franchise in mid-November. The team was based in Delaware.

== History ==
In September 1933, the Wilmington Football Association announced the additions of two teams for the 1933 season: the Fifth Ward Democrats, and Ninth Ward Ducks. The Ducks had previously been a league member while Fifth Ward was new. The league arranged the Democrats' first game to be against the Eleventh Ward Whitejackets, who had won the championship for the past two seasons. The game, scheduled for October 1 at Lattimer Field, ended in a 0–26 defeat. The Morning News wrote, "Approximately 3500 fans witnessed the game at the Whitejacket's new field and were well pleased with the orderly manner in which the game was conducted. The Fifth Ward eleven while boasting a strong eleven, the starting lineup containing several Penn-Del players, showed the need for more practice, and if this fault is overcome the Taylor outfit should give the rest of the clubs a merry chase for title honors."

The team's next matchup was against the Defiance Bulldogs, the oldest member of the league as well as two-time champion. Fifth ward was able to tie the Bulldogs 7–7, due to a late 95-yard interception return to tie the game in the fourth quarter. A game recap by The Morning News said, "In a hard-fought battle at Talleyville yesterday, Defiance and Fifth Ward Democrats battled to a 7 to 7 deadlock in their Wilmington Football Association game." Defiance led from the second quarter (on a touchdown by Haley) to the fourth, before Taggart, of Fifth Ward, returned a Defiance pass 95 yards to tie the game. The tie put them fourth of six in the league's standings.

Fifth Ward would move one place down in the standings following their week three game against the Delaware Panthers. The Panthers "smothered" Fifth Ward, shutting them out 0–65. The game was played at Panther Field on October 15. The next week would also be a shutout, losing 0–26 versus the Ninth Ward Ducks on the same venue. The loss moved them down to last place in the league, sharing the position with the St. Mary's Cats. The team's next scheduled game, against the last-place St. Mary's, was postponed as both teams were eliminated from the first-half title race and desired to rest to prepare for the second half.

An October 30 article by The Morning News wrote, "The Democratic Club, with the addition of several new players, expect to give a good account of themselves in the second half." The team's first second half game was the same as the first, against the Eleventh Ward Whitejackets, who had just won their third consecutive league title. The game, played in Lattimer field again, finished with a 0–13 loss. The next game was against Defiance, at Krebbs Field. Fifth Ward forfeited the game and was dropped from the league in the following week. The rest of its games were considered to be forfeits.
