= Lymphocyte function-associated antigen =

Lymphocyte function-associated antigen (LFA) may refer to:

- LFA-1
- CD2, LFA-2
- CD58, LFA-3
