= Nick Bucci (American football) =

American football player (1932–2019)

Profile
- Position: Back

Personal information
- Born: February 10, 1932; Wilmington, Delaware, U.S.
- Died: February 8, 2019 (aged 86); Wilmington, Delaware, U.S.
- Listed height: 5 ft 8 in (1.73 m)
- Listed weight: 170 lb (77 kg)

Career information
- High school: Claymont (DE)
- College: Florida (1950); Delaware (1951)

Career history
- Marcus Hook Athletic Association (1951–1953)

Awards and highlights
- 2× First-team all-state (1948, 1949); Delaware Athlete of the Year (1949); 2× Wilmington Football League champion (1952, 1953); Delaware Sports Museum and Hall of Fame (2004)

Nicholas Bucci Sr. (February 10, 1932 – February 8, 2019) was an American football back. He was inducted into the Delaware Sports Museum and Hall of Fame for his play at Claymont High School, where he was the first "Delaware Athlete of the Year" after leading the state with 149 points in 1949. He later played college football for Florida and Delaware before spending three years with the Marcus Hook Athletic Association of the Wilmington Football League, winning two championships.

== Early life ==
Bucci was born on February 10, 1932, in Wilmington, Delaware, to James and Anna Bucci (diGiorgio). He attended Claymont High School, where he played football, basketball, baseball, and track, earning a total of 14 varsity letters.

Bucci was named to the Journal-Every Evening all-state football team twice in his career, and was the first two-time selection. His coach described him as "the best running back I ever had," and Claymont's "best blocker, one of our best tacklers, our best passer, and a fair punter." As a senior, he helped the team compile an undefeated record, scoring 149 of their 250 points (including 23 touchdowns) and leading the state in scoring. For this, he was named the first "Delaware Athlete of the Year," but did not receive the award due to rules of the Delaware Association of School Administrators which declared that high school athletes are ineligible to receive the award.

== College and semi-professional career ==
After receiving offers from Florida, Cornell, Delaware, North Carolina, Penn State, and Yale, Bucci accepted a scholarship from the University of Florida in 1950. He played on their freshman football team that year, but "got homesick," and returned to his home state of Delaware in 1951. He then enrolled at the University of Delaware, playing part of one season before leaving the school.

After leaving the University of Delaware, Bucci joined the independent Marcus Hook Athletic Association in October 1951. He returned to the team for their 1952 season, as a member of the Wilmington Football League, and helped them achieve an undefeated 7–0 record and the league championship title. He also played for their 1953 championship team before being sent to the United States Navy.

== Later life and death ==
After serving three years in the Navy, Bucci worked for the Phoenix Steel Corporation for 36 years, and later at Sears and in the Philadelphia Phillies security. He also worked for the New Castle County crossing guards until his retirement at the age of 80.

With his wife, Tina, Bucci had three children. His only son, Nick Jr., was described as the "direct opposite" of Nick Sr., never playing sports and instead being a musician.

Bucci was inducted into the Delaware Sports Museum and Hall of Fame in 2004.

Bucci died on February 8, 2019, at the age of 86 in the Wilmington Hospital. It was two days before what would have been his 87th birthday.
