= CD2BP2 =

Protein-coding gene in humans

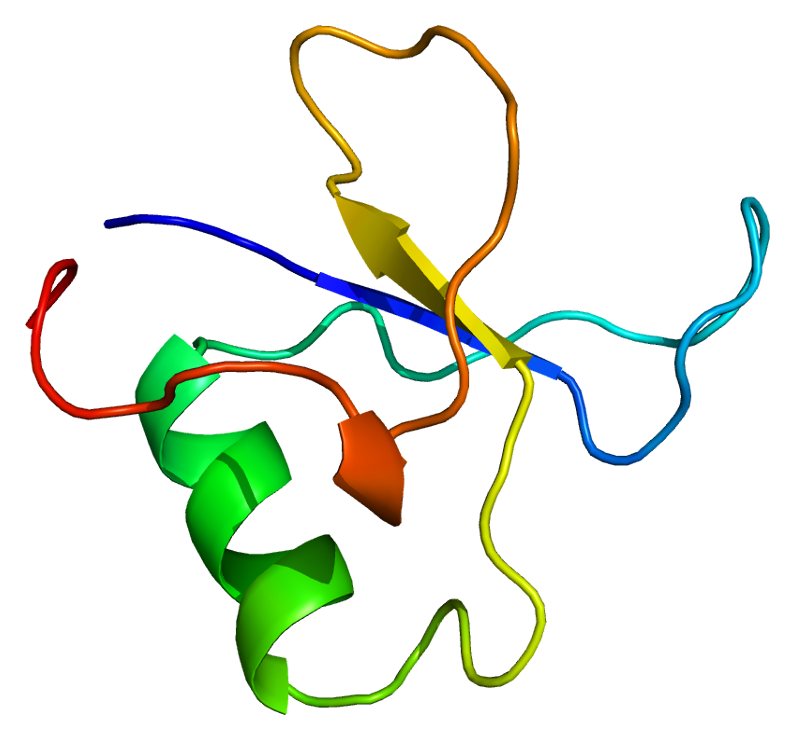

Identifiers
- Aliases: CD2BP2, FWP010, LIN1, PPP1R59, Snu40, U5-52K, CD2 (cytoplasmic tail) binding protein 2, CD2 cytoplasmic tail binding protein 2
- External IDs: OMIM: 604470; MGI: 1917483; GeneCards: CD2BP2
Available structures
PDB	Ortholog search: PDBe RCSB
PDB	List of PDB id codes 1GYF, 1L2Z, 1SYX, 4BWS

Gene location (Human)
Chr.	Chromosome 16 (human)
Band	16p11.2	Start	30,350,773 bp
Band	16p11.2	End	30,355,308 bp

Gene location (Mouse)
Chr.	Chromosome 7 (mouse)
Band	7|7 F3	Start	126,790,832 bp
Band	7|7 F3	End	126,795,222 bp
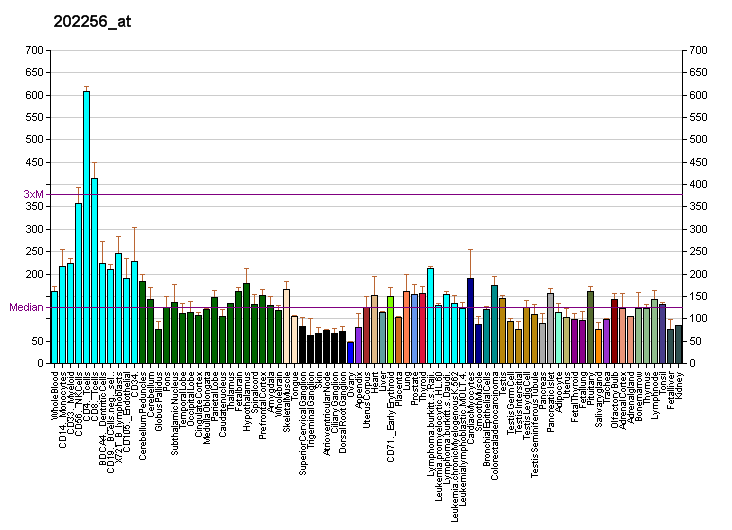

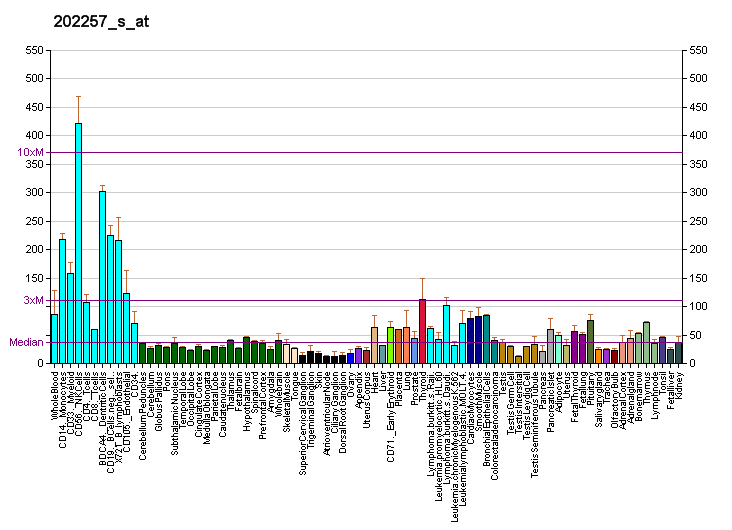
RNA expression pattern
Bgee	Human / Mouse (ortholog); Top expressed in: tendon of biceps brachii; granulocyte; left adrenal gland; left adrenal cortex; right adrenal gland; right adrenal cortex; islet of Langerhans; beta cell; left uterine tube; gastric mucosa / Top expressed in: saccule; otic placode; otic vesicle; ventricular zone; dentate gyrus of hippocampal formation granule cell; neural layer of retina; ganglionic eminence; granulocyte; epiblast; superior cervical ganglion; More reference expression data
BioGPS	More reference expression data
Gene ontology
Molecular function	ribonucleoprotein complex binding; protein binding
Cellular component	U5 snRNP; nuclear speck; U4/U6 x U5 tri-snRNP complex; nucleus; nucleoplasm; fibrillar center; cytoplasm; cytosol
Biological process	negative regulation of phosphatase activity; mRNA splicing, via spliceosome; mRNA processing; spliceosomal tri-snRNP complex assembly; RNA splicing
Sources:Amigo / QuickGO
Orthologs
Databases	NCBI: entry; OMA: entry
Species	Human	Mouse
Entrez	10421	70233
Ensembl	ENSG00000169217	ENSMUSG00000042502
UniProt	O95400	Q9CWK3
RefSeq (mRNA)	NM_006110; NM_001243646	NM_001285905; NM_001285906; NM_001285907; NM_027353; NM_001357817
RefSeq (protein)	NP_001230575; NP_006101; NP_001230575.1; NP_006101.1	NP_001272834; NP_001272835; NP_001272836; NP_081629; NP_001344746
Location (UCSC)	Chr 16: 30.35 – 30.36 Mb	Chr 7: 126.79 – 126.8 Mb
PubMed search
- Wikidata
View/Edit Human	View/Edit Mouse

CD2 antigen cytoplasmic tail-binding protein 2 is a protein that in humans is encoded by the CD2BP2 gene.

== Interactions ==
CD2BP2 has been shown to interact with CD2.
