= Delaware Panthers =

General information
- Founded: September 1932
- Folded: c. September 1934
- Stadium: Panther Field at Brack-Ex (1932); Panther Field at du Pont Road (1933)
- Headquartered: Marshallton, Delaware

Personnel
- Head coach: Nippy Hartman (1932–1933)

Team history
- Marshallton Panthers (September 1932); Delaware Panthers (October 1932–1934)

League / conference affiliations
- Independent (1932); Wilmington Football Association (1933)

The Delaware Panthers, founded as the Marshallton Panthers, were a short-lived semi-professional American football team that played two seasons. The first was as a first-class independent in 1932 while the second was as a member of the minor Wilmington Football Association. The team was based in Marshallton, Delaware, and played their home games at Panther Field.

== History ==
=== 1932 season ===
The Panthers were founded in 1932, and "held its first get together" on September 13, in Marshallton, Delaware. The team planned for their first game to be played near October 9. An article by The Evening Journal wrote, "Manager Potts hopes to install floodlight on the field soon for night drills. The Panthers wish to announce that they are not affiliated with the City Football League and will play independently this season." The team started the season with a victory over the Wilmington Association Brandywine Hawks.

Nearly a month after the team's founding, they changed their name from the Marshallton Panthers to Delaware Panthers, shortly before the season's second game. The Evening Journal wrote, "The Panthers will play first class independent Sunday football booking teams in Delaware, Maryland, Pennsylvania and New Jersey, with Marcus Hook, West Chester and Penn's Grove preferred. Teams desiring Sunday games with the Panthers are requested to get in touch with Manager Howard Potts at Marshallton between 7 and 10 p. m. or George M. Lucas at Cranston Heights." The team's first game as the Delaware Panthers was scheduled against the Newark Yellowjackets on October 9.

The game against Newark ended in a 24–0 victory (Note: Every Evening reported 25–0. The Evening Journal reported 24-0.) for Delaware following four touchdowns and one "free point". The game was played before approximately 1,200 fans. Every Evening reported, "The Newark team, coached by "Shorty" Chalmers, former All-Maryland halfback, did not seem to have any uniformity in their plays. The first quarter of the game ended with both teams unable to score. In the second period the Panthers started the fireworks by making gain after gain, McFall finally getting the pigskin over the final chalk line for a tally. The extra point was kicked at a difficult angle." The Evening Journal wrote, "The Panthers' smooth working backfield and their brilliant interference from the line enabled them to subdue the jackets."

The following game was scheduled for October 16, against the De La Warr Dragons, of Claymont. However, shortly afterwards the Panthers changed their opponent to the Arden Blue Jackets. The results against Arden are unknown, but a late-November article stated that the Panthers only lost one game all season. The next scheduled game for the Panthers was against Fort DuPont, who had just come off of a win versus the Brandywine Hawks. The Evening Journal reported, "Fort DuPont has taken on a man sized job for tomorrow afternoon, booking the Delaware Panthers of Wilmington at the Delaware City Army Post." It also said Fort DuPont "should have plenty of trouble on their hands tomorrow". According to a mid-November article by The Evening Journal, the game against Fort DuPont was a loss for the Panthers.

The Panthers played another game at their home field of Panther Field at Brack-Ex, on October 30, against the "Aztecs Negro eleven". The Panthers won the game, shutting the Aztecs out 79–0. The Evening Journal reported that after the game "Manager Potts is endeavoring to secure Penn's Grove or West Chester for a game next Sunday." Whether or not a game was played against them is unknown. The next known game was played against the Eleventh Ward Whitejackets, previously champions of the Wilmington Association, in mid-November. Eleventh Ward was originally scheduled to play the Brandywine Hawks but the game was postponed on request. The game had championship implications, as the loser would be eliminated from the state title race.

The game against the Whitejackets ended in a scoreless tie. A game recap by The Evening Journal said, "The Delaware Panthers held Eleventh Ward, Wilmington Football Association champions to a scoreless tie before some 6,000 fans at Boxwood yesterday. Haggeman and Mickey McFall, 210-pound plunging halfback, crashed through the Whitejacket line time and time again but were unable to carry the oval over. The Panthers' line held like a stonewall against the assault launched by the Warders. Sharp also played sensational ball for the Panthers while Drennan, DeMarco, Pennock and Cherry excelled for the Jackets. On several occasions the fans swarmed out onto the field and made playing almost impossible. Players carrying the ball were interfered with several times."

After the tie the manager of the Defiance Bulldogs, another Wilmington Association team, attempted to arrange a match against the Panthers. They already had a scheduled game on Thanksgiving, but wanted to move it to a different day. The Panthers accepted the offer and planned to play the game on the following Sunday. The game was scheduled for 2:30 p.m. at Kreb's Field, on November 20. The result was the Panthers' fifth victory of the season and it was their final game, as they finished 5–1–1.

=== 1933 season ===
The Panthers held their first meeting of the 1933 season on September 5; the meeting included the election of team officers and staff, as well as the discussion of team business. Other meetings were held on September 7, 8, and 12. At the elections, Pat McLaren was named team president, Harrison Vest team treasurer, and Nooky Burd secretary. The first team practice was held on September 14, at Fourth & Ferris streets. After the Brandywine A. A. of the Wilmington Football Association withdrew from the league, each remaining member voted for the Panthers to replace them in a meeting held on September 14.

The team officially joined on September 27, following their forfeit posting. The Evening Journal reported, "[The] Delaware Panthers posted their forfeit in the Wilmington Football Association yesterday and the circuit is all set to go with the six-team wheel as originally planned. The Panthers explained to Tom Brand, association secretary, they had no intentions of dropping from the loop and that it was through a misunderstanding they did not have a representative present at the meeting Tuesday night when forfeits were posted." The Panthers were given a bye week while the season opened, as their league debut was postponed.

The Panthers' debut was scheduled for October 8, at Lattimer Field in Newport, against the Ninth Ward Ducks. The Ducks had joined the league one day after the Panthers, though they previously had a stint in the league during 1929. The game against the Ducks would end in a 2–0 victory, with their only points scored on a safety. In a game recap The Morning News wrote, "A blocked punt by Sharp in the second quarter accounted for the only score of the well-played game. Both teams muffed several scoring chances when within striking distance of the opposing goal line but neither seemed to have the necessary punch to take the ball over."

The team's first home game would be played the following week, against the new Fifth Ward Democrats. It would be their first game at their newest stadium. They "smothered" and "crushed" the Democrats, winning 65–0. The Morning News described the Panthers as "scoring almost at will" and wrote Fifth Ward "did not have a scoring opportunity throughout the game". Afterwards they were scheduled to matchup with the Eleventh Ward Whitejackets, defending champions for the past two seasons. A preview of the game by The Evening Journal and The Morning News said, "One of the outstanding games of the season will be the attraction at Lattimer Field, Maryland avenue and Broom street, Sunday afternoon when the Eleventh Ward White-jackets, defending champions and the Delaware Panthers tie for the runner-up honors, clash. The outcome of the struggle will have much bearing on the league standing and will go far in deciding the title."

Against the Whitejackets, the Panthers lost 0–22. The loss moved them from runners-up to third place in the league. An article by The Evening Journal wrote, "Eleventh Ward Whitejackets, defending champions, increased their lead margin in the Wilmington Football Association yesterday by trouncing the Delaware Panthers on Lattimer Field, 22 to 0. The defeat sent the Panthers from the runner-up position into third place while Defiance held second with its third tie. The game was nip and tuck in the opening period but the Jackets gradually drew away for a touchdown in the second quarter, another and a field goal in the third and a third touchdown in the final session. The Panther machine failed to click after the brilliant opening stanza. Following a scoreless first period in which the Panthers dominated play when they accounted for four successive first downs as the game got under way, Eleventh Ward realized its initial score of the game when Smith tossed to Aiken for a 55-yard advance and touchdown. With the ball deep in enemy territory Bippy DeMarco added three points to Eleventh Ward's score with a drop-kick from the 33-yard line. The victors later scored when Miskie raced 42 yards off tackle for a touchdown. The final touchdown of the game came in the final-period when Kemp intercepted a forward pass and raced 35 yards. DeMarco added the extra point with a drop-kick."

The first-half of the season closed with the Panthers regaining the runner-up position after defeating the Defiance Bulldogs 7–0. The game was played at Panther Field, du Pont road on October 29. Their first game as part of the second half would match them up with the St. Mary's Cats, who they had originally been scheduled to play in early October. They played to a 6–6 tie against St. Mary's, with each team scoring a touchdown in the second quarter and missing the extra point.

The Panthers would play another home game on November 12, versus the Ninth Ward Ducks, who they had beaten by two points earlier in the year. They would record another victory, this time winning 8–0. The Evening Journal wrote, "The Delaware Panthers took undisputed possession of third place and continued on the heels of the leaders with an 8 to 0 victory over the Ninth Ward Ducks at Panther Field. The Panthers scored in the second quarter when Burd kicked out of bounds on the Ducks two-yard line. Kerrigan of the Ducks was set to punt back when a pass from center was high. He was tackled behind the goal. A sustained drive of 55 yards netted the only touchdown in the third period with McFall going off tackle for the tally. His drop kick for the extra point was blocked." The Panthers were given a bye week following their game against Ninth Ward. They hoped to play a game against the De Law Warr Dragons or Newark Yellow Jackets, but did not schedule a game.

After the bye the Panthers had to play the Eleventh Ward Whitejackets, in what would decide the season's champion. The Morning News wrote, "Neither team has suffered a defeat this half but the Panthers have been held to a tie and are consequently one point behind the Whitejackets. The Panthers have been pointing for this game and have high hopes of avenging the setback handed them in the first half. The Warders have lost several players but showed that they have enough man power to carry on by their hard earned victory over Defiance."

The Panthers lost against the Whitejackets, in a 6–25 defeat. It gave the Whitejackets the championship for the third consecutive season. A recap by The Morning News reported, "Although the teams battled on even terms through the first half, the Eleventh Ward Whitejackets applied the pressure in the closing half to top the Delaware Panthers, in their game at Lattimer Field yesterday, 25 to 6, and win the City Football Association title for the second straight year. (Note: It was actually the Whitejackets' third consecutive league title.) Eleventh Ward scored its first touchdown in the opening period when Miskie, almost single-handed, advanced the ball from mid-field to score in three plays. The Panthers matched this touchdown a few minutes later when Helenski scored on a 60-yard run. Neither team could work its way into scoring territory in the second period, but at the start of the second half the Jackets got its offensive maneuvers in working condition and took the lead when Miskie scored from the 10-yard line following a sustained drive. Miskie again crossed the goal line as the final quarter got underway when he intercepted a pass and raced 55 yards behind perfect interference. "Bippy" DeMarco drop-kicked the extra point as the ultimate victors went to a 19 to 6 lead. Another intercepted pass in the waning minutes of play led to the Warders' fourth and final touchdown when E. Pennock grabbed a Panther aerial and raced 65 yards."

After the game, the league announced that the Panthers were tied with the Defiance Bulldogs in the standings and scheduled a tie-breaker for the following week. In the game, they shut out the Bulldogs, winning 7–0 to earn the second spot in the standings. A brief recap by The Evening Journal wrote, "The Delaware Panthers sewed up the runner-up honors for the second half of the Wilmington Football Association yesterday by downing the Defiance Bulldogs in their battle for second place at Panther Field, 7 to 0. The game was nip and tuck throughout with the Panthers' lone score coming in the second period. Demaree, Panther left halfback went over for the only tally on a buck through center."

After the Wilmington Football Association season ended, the Panthers said they hoped to schedule more games with independent teams. On December 11, the team began planning for a banquet to celebrate their season. The team held another meeting on December 21 and the banquet took place the following day at Marshallton.

Though the Panthers were expected to join the league for the 1934 season, they did not and folded shortly afterwards.
