= Ladies Football Association =

Ladies Football Association may refer to:

== Soccer ==
- Dutch Ladies Football Association (est. 1955), part of women's football in the Netherlands
- English Ladies Football Association (ELFA; 1921–1922), England, UK
- Hong Kong Ladies Football Association (HKLFA; est. 1986), becoming the Hong Kong Women League
- International Ladies Football Association (ILFA); see UEFA Women's Championship
- Ladies Football Association of Ireland (LFAI; est. 1973); former name of the Football Association of Ireland, Women's (WFAI)
- Philippine Ladies' Football Association (PLFA, PhiLFA; est. 1980), Philippines; eventually replaced by the Philippine Women's Football Association (PWFA; est. 2021)
- Queensland Ladies' Football Association (est. 1921, as the Queensland Ladies' Soccer Association), Queensland, Australia; see Bardon Latrobe FC

== Other ==
- Ladies' Football Association (est. 1862), Maldon, New South Wales, Australia; in Australian-rules football; see Australian rules football culture

== See also ==
- Women's Football Association (disambiguation)
- Sports league
- Sports federation
- Football association
- Women's American football
- Women's association football
- Women's Australian rules football
