= NOL4 =

Protein-coding gene in the species Homo sapiens

Identifiers
- Aliases: NOL4, CT125, NOLP, HRIHFB2255, nucleolar protein 4
- External IDs: OMIM: 603577; MGI: 2441684; HomoloGene: 36142; GeneCards: NOL4; OMA:NOL4 - orthologs

Gene location (Human)
Chr.	Chromosome 18 (human)
Band	18q12.1	Start	33,851,100 bp
Band	18q12.1	End	34,224,952 bp

Gene location (Mouse)
Chr.	Chromosome 18 (mouse)
Band	18|18 A2	Start	22,826,238 bp
Band	18|18 A2	End	23,174,710 bp
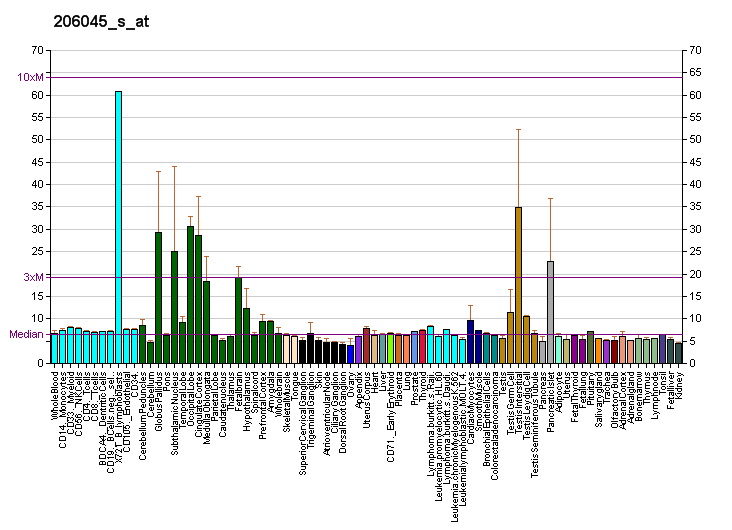
RNA expression pattern
Bgee	Human / Mouse (ortholog); Top expressed in: middle temporal gyrus; buccal mucosa cell; endothelial cell; Brodmann area 23; ganglionic eminence; islet of Langerhans; entorhinal cortex; superior frontal gyrus; primary visual cortex; ventricular zone / Top expressed in: Rostral migratory stream; ventromedial nucleus; anterior amygdaloid area; lateral septal nucleus; primary motor cortex; habenula; prefrontal cortex; cingulate gyrus; subiculum; arcuate nucleus; More reference expression data
BioGPS	More reference expression data
Orthologs
Species	Human	Mouse
Entrez	8715	319211
Ensembl	ENSG00000101746	ENSMUSG00000041923
UniProt	O94818	P60954
RefSeq (mRNA)	NM_001198546; NM_001198547; NM_001198548; NM_001198549; NM_001282527 NM_003787; NM_001353232; NM_001353233; NM_001353234; NM_001353235; NM_001353236; NM_001353237; NM_001384467; NM_001384468; NM_001384469; NM_001384470; NM_001384471; NM_001384472; NM_001384473	NM_001161483; NM_199024; NM_001347509; NM_001347510; NM_001361223 NM_001361224; NM_001361225
RefSeq (protein)	NP_001185475; NP_001185476; NP_001185477; NP_001185478; NP_001269456 NP_003778; NP_001340161; NP_001340162; NP_001340163; NP_001340164; NP_001340165; NP_001340166	NP_001154955; NP_001334438; NP_001334439; NP_950189; NP_001348152 NP_001348153; NP_001348154
Location (UCSC)	Chr 18: 33.85 – 34.22 Mb	Chr 18: 22.83 – 23.17 Mb
PubMed search
- Wikidata
View/Edit Human	View/Edit Mouse

Nucleolar protein 4 is a protein that in humans is encoded by the NOL4 gene.

== See also ==
- Nucleolus
