= OR4C3 =

Protein-coding gene in the species Homo sapiens

Identifiers
- Aliases: OR4C3, OR11-98, olfactory receptor family 4 subfamily C member 3
- External IDs: MGI: 2177523; GeneCards: OR4C3

Gene location (Human)
Chr.	Chromosome 11 (human)
Band	11p11.2	Start	48,324,920 bp
Band	11p11.2	End	48,325,955 bp

Gene location (Mouse)
Chr.	Chromosome 2 (mouse)
Band	2|2 E1	Start	89,879,724 bp
Band	2|2 E1	End	89,893,938 bp
RNA expression pattern
Bgee	Human / Mouse (ortholog); Top expressed in: renal cortex / Top expressed in: respiratory epithelium; nasal epithelium; olfactory epithelium; More reference expression data
BioGPS	n/a
Gene ontology
Molecular function	G protein-coupled receptor activity; olfactory receptor activity; transmembrane signaling receptor activity; signal transducer activity
Cellular component	membrane; plasma membrane; integral component of membrane
Biological process	sensory perception of smell; detection of chemical stimulus involved in sensory perception of smell; detection of chemical stimulus involved in sensory perception; signal transduction; response to stimulus; G protein-coupled receptor signaling pathway
Sources:Amigo / QuickGO
Orthologs
Databases	NCBI: entry; OMA: entry
Species	Human	Mouse
Entrez	256144	57272
Ensembl	ENSG00000176547	ENSMUSG00000075068
UniProt	Q8NH37	Q60878
RefSeq (mRNA)	NM_001004702	NM_020515
RefSeq (protein)	NP_001004702	NP_065261
Location (UCSC)	Chr 11: 48.32 – 48.33 Mb	Chr 2: 89.88 – 89.89 Mb
PubMed search
- Wikidata
View/Edit Human	View/Edit Mouse

Olfactory receptor 4C3 is a protein that in humans is encoded by the OR4C3 gene.

Olfactory receptors interact with odorant molecules in the nose, to initiate a neuronal response that triggers the perception of a smell. The olfactory receptor proteins are members of a large family of G-protein-coupled receptors (GPCR) arising from single coding-exon genes. Olfactory receptors share a 7-transmembrane domain structure with many neurotransmitter and hormone receptors and are responsible for the recognition and G protein-mediated transduction of odorant signals. The olfactory receptor gene family is the largest in the genome. The nomenclature assigned to the olfactory receptor genes and proteins for this organism is independent of other organisms.

== See also ==
- Olfactory receptor
