= CD58 =

Mammalian protein found in humans

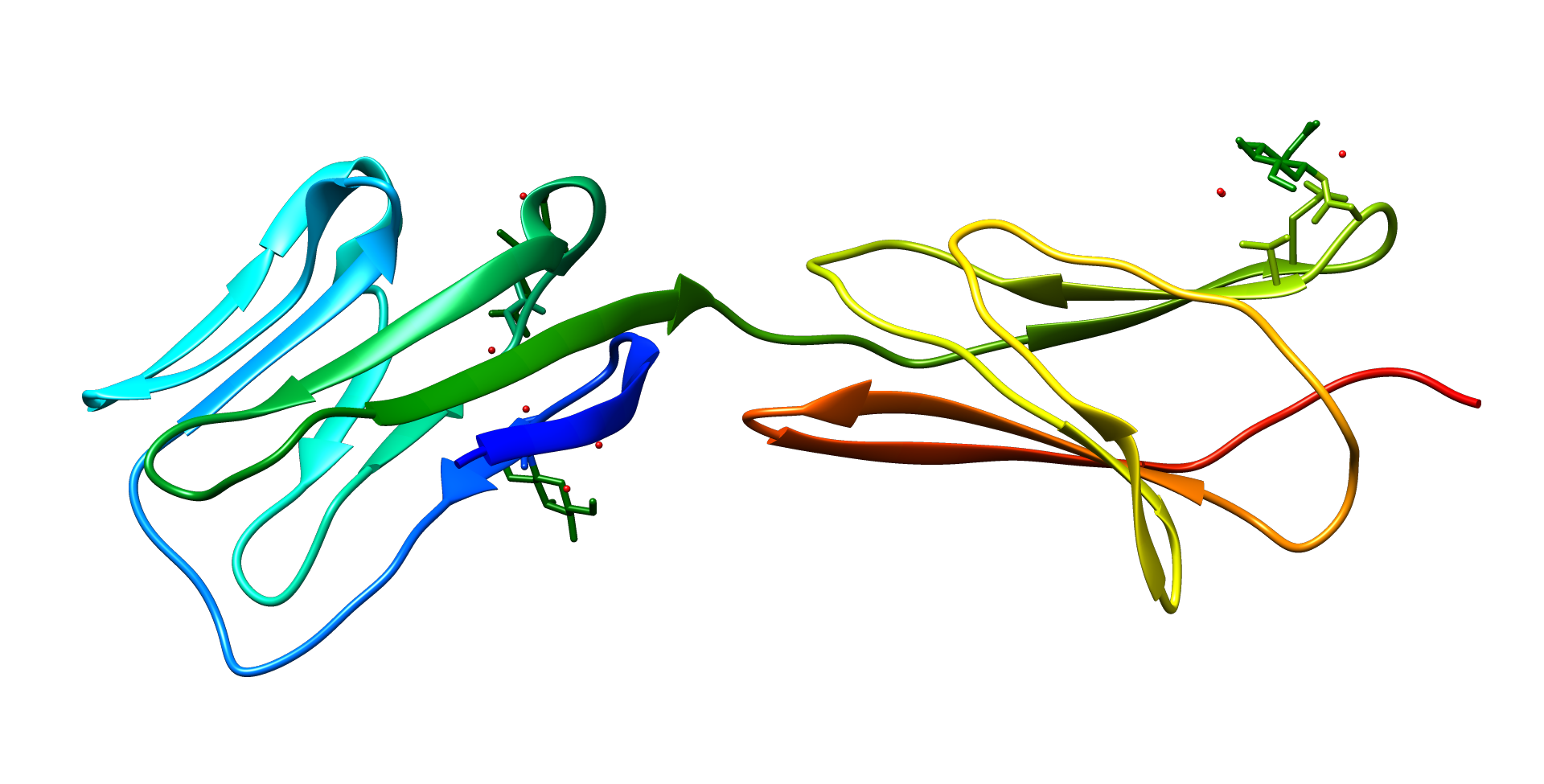

Identifiers
- Aliases: CD58, LFA-3, LFA3, ag3, CD58 molecule
- External IDs: OMIM: 153420; GeneCards: CD58
Available structures
PDB	Human UniProt search: PDBe RCSB
PDB	List of PDB id codes 1CCZ, 1CI5, 1QA9

Gene location (Human)
Chr.	Chromosome 1 (human)
Band	1p13.1	Start	116,514,534 bp
Band	1p13.1	End	116,571,039 bp
RNA expression pattern
Bgee	Human / Mouse (ortholog); Top expressed in: jejunal mucosa; monocyte; right lung; mucosa of sigmoid colon; right ventricle; periodontal fiber; Achilles tendon; palpebral conjunctiva; bone marrow; rectum / n/a; More reference expression data
BioGPS	n/a
Gene ontology
Molecular function	signaling receptor binding; protein binding
Cellular component	anchored component of membrane; extracellular exosome; plasma membrane; membrane; cell surface; integral component of membrane; integral component of plasma membrane; secretory granule membrane; ficolin-1-rich granule membrane
Biological process	heterotypic cell-cell adhesion; cellular response to tumor necrosis factor; leukocyte migration; cellular response to interferon-gamma; cell adhesion; neutrophil degranulation; cell-cell adhesion
Sources:Amigo / QuickGO
Orthologs
Databases	NCBI: entry; OMA: entry
Species	Human	Mouse
Entrez	965	n/a
Ensembl	ENSG00000116815	n/a
UniProt	P19256	n/a
RefSeq (mRNA)	NM_001144822; NM_001779	n/a
RefSeq (protein)	NP_001138294; NP_001770	n/a
Location (UCSC)	Chr 1: 116.51 – 116.57 Mb	n/a
PubMed search		n/a
- Wikidata
View/Edit Human

CD58, or lymphocyte function-associated antigen 3 (LFA-3), is a protein that in humans is encoded by the CD58 gene. CD58 is a cell adhesion molecule expressed on Antigen Presenting Cells (APCs), particularly macrophages, and other tissue cells.

CD58 binds to CD2 (LFA-2) on T cells and is important in strengthening the adhesion and recognition between the T cells and Professional Antigen Presenting Cells, facilitating signal transduction necessary for an immune response. This adhesion occurs as part of the transitory initial encounters between T cells and Antigen Presenting Cells before T cell activation, when T cells are roaming the lymph nodes looking at the surface of APCs for peptide:MHC complexes the T-cell receptors are reactive to.

Polymorphisms in the CD58 gene are associated with increased risk for multiple sclerosis. Genomic region containing the single-nucleotide polymorphism rs1335532, associated with high risk of multiple sclerosis, has enhancer properties and can significantly boost the CD58 promoter activity in lymphoblast cells. The protective (C) rs1335532 allele creates functional binding site for ASCL2 transcription factor, a target of the Wnt signaling pathway.

== Structure ==
The CD58 glycoprotein can be found in two different protein isoforms, each on the cell surface. These include transmembrane and GPI-anchored form. It has been found that in both isoforms, CD58 is able to interact with a variety of different kinases, and is not dependent on only one form. Rather, each isoform is able to associate more effectively with different kinases. Each form, transmembrane and GPI-anchored, can be found in different parts of the cell membrane. The GPI-anchored isoform is mostly found in lipid rafts while the transmembrane isoform is mainly found in nonraft domains. Despite this, the transmembrane CD58 form can trigger independent signaling without the need for the GPI-anchored isoform. Transmembrane CD58 has a structure that consists of six N-linked glycosylation sites in the extracellular domain, a hydrophobic transmembrane domain, and finally a short cytoplasmic domain. GPI-anchored CD58 has a similar extracellular domain, but no hydrophobic transmembrane domain or cytoplasmic domain. Rather, it is linked to the cell membrane via a GPI tail. It is estimated that the CD58 structure is made of approximately 44–68% carbohydrate. The structure of CD58 also plays a role in cell adhesion. A study found that effective cell adhesion was dependent on the density of CD58. Comparing the GPI-anchored and transmembrane isoforms, the GPI-anchored is much more efficient during cell adhesion, and on average, takes much less time than the transmembrane isoform. Regardless, the structure of both the GPI-anchor and transmembrane CD58 are crucial in overall function. While the GPI-anchor enhances cell adhesion, the transmembrane isoform is more efficient in cell signal transduction.

== Function ==
CD58, lymphocyte-function antigen 3 (LFA-3), is a glycoprotein that plays a vital role in the body's immune response. The natural ligand to CD58, CD2, is most commonly found on the surfaces of both T cells and natural killer cells (T/NK cells). During an immune response, the interactions between the CD2 and CD58 glycoproteins allows for the activation and proliferation of both T and natural killer cells, enhancing cell adhesion. Furthermore, upon activation, a succession of intracellular signaling within T and natural killer cells and other target cells occurs, enhancing further cell recognition. Overall, CD58-CD2 interactions are intricate and involved in a variety of immune regulatory responses, including antiviral, inflammation in numerous autoimmune diseases, and immune rejections in organ transplants.

CD58 is expressed on a variety of different cells, including hematopoietic and nonhematopoietic cells. More specifically, CD58 is expressed on cell surfaces, allowing for effector-target adhesion sequentially to antigen recognition. This adhesion allows for proper T cell activation via correct cell signaling.

== CD58 and CD2 interaction ==
The composition of CD2 and CD58 share many similarities. Both extracellular domains have similar amino acid sequences which aid in cell adhesion. This allows for a high affinity of the extracellular amino-terminal sequence on CD2 to bind with CD58, which has a capacity to bind to CD2 on T cells, on target cells. For a regulatory T cell to become activated, the recognition of an antigen located within a major histocompatibility complex (MHC) protein by the TcR, or T cell receptor, is insufficient. Proliferation of regulatory T cells requires the TcR recognition and other co-stimulatory signals. The binding of CD2-CD58 allows for the formation of a co-stimulatory signal, contributing to further regulatory T cell proliferation and regulation of T cell responses via signaling transduction.

== Clinical significance ==
=== Cancer ===
CD58 plays a role in the regulation of colorectal tumor-initiating cells (CT-ICs). Thus, cells that express CD58 have become a cell of interest in tumorigenesis. Mutations of CD58 have been linked to immune evasion observed in some lymphomas and studies are underway to analyze how its involvement directly affects classical Hodgkin lymphoma (cHL).

=== Multiple sclerosis ===
Multiple Sclerosis (MS) is autoimmune disease that affects the central nervous system (CNS). In an individual with MS, the immune system attacks the myelin sheath, which are crucial for covering nerve fibers and allowing proper communication with the brain and the rest of the body. A genomic association study suggested that there is a risk of developing MS in individuals with allelic variation in the CD58 gene coding region. Further research done on the topic suggested that there is a strong association between CD58 single-nucleotide polymorphism (SNP) rs12044852 and the onset of MS. Another study focused on the (SNP) rs1414273 in the microRNA-548ac stem-loop region of the CD58 gene. More specifically, the SNP was found to have an influence on Drosha cleavage activity, which can cause uncoupling of the expression of CD58 and microRNA-548ac production. The data from the study also showed carriers of the allele rs1414273 showed an overall decrease in CD58 mRNA levels. However, the carriers of the allele did exhibit an increase in the levels of has-miR-548ac. There is an influence between CD58 and susceptibility to MS. On a similar note, a genome wide association study found that the SNP rs1335532 was associated with a decrease in the susceptibility of developing MS. In addition, it was found that in individuals with MS had an increase in CD58 mRNA. This was because the region where rs1335532 resides had certain properties that increased the activity of CD58 in lymphoblasts. The protective rs1335532 allele also targeted the Wnt signaling pathway by creating a binding site for ASCL2, a transcription factor and target of the Wnt signaling pathway. In immune cells like monocytes and primary B-cells, the Wnt signaling pathway activation causes an increase in CD58 promotor activity via a strong binding site of ASCL2. A reduced expression of CD58 is a possible risk for developing MS.

=== Rheumatoid arthritis ===
Rheumatoid arthritis (RA) is an autoimmune disease that mainly affects an individual's joints, but can affect and cause problems in different tissues. A study that used enzyme-linked immunosorbent assay (ELISA) to measure sCD58 (soluble form of CD58) in individuals with RA and normal controls (NC) to determine if there was a correlation between sCD58 levels and RA. It was found that sCD58 levels were significantly lower in the individuals with RA compared to those in the control (NC). The sCD58 levels in the synovial fluid (SF) of the individuals with RA were also lower than the control subjects. A decrease in sCD58 production could cause a decrease in CD2-CD58 adhesion, leading to an increase in T cells. Continued inflammation would also be an effect of the decrease in sCD58.
