= Wilmington Football League =

Defunct American football league based in Delaware

- Formerly: Wilmington Football Association (1930–1935, 1940–1941)
- Classification: Semi-Pro
- Sport: American football
- Founded: Sep. 1929
- First season: 1929
- Folded: 1956
- No. of teams: 3–9
- Country: United States
- Last champion: Conrad Alumni (1955)
- Most titles: Defiance Bulldogs (4.5)
- Sponsor: Huber's Sporting Goods

The Wilmington Football League, also known as the Wilmington Football Association (1930–1935, 1940–1941), was a semi-professional American football league that existed from 1929 to 1956. It was based in Wilmington, Delaware. From 1932 to 1935, the league was split into the Wilmington City Football League and Wilmington Football Association.

== Origins ==
The first known American football league based in Wilmington, Delaware, was called the "All-Wilmington Football League" and operated in 1913. Little information is known about it.

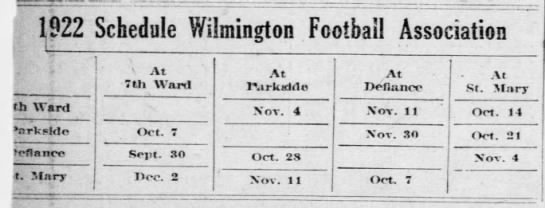
1922 Schedule

From 1922 to 1924, another league based in Wilmington, Delaware operated under the "Wilmington Football Association" name. Teams in 1922 included the Seventh Ward Chicks, Parkside, Defiance Academy Bulldogs, (Note: Possibly the same as the Defiance Bulldogs who played from 1929–.) and the St. Mary's Cats. Ben Greenstein, editor for The Evening Journal, was named president. Defiance clinched the 1922 championship by winning 78–0 against Seventh Ward. Seventh Ward left in the second season, bringing the league down to three teams. They set up a six-game schedule, with Defiance winning out again. In a meeting held on September 16, 1924, seven teams planned to join and Ed Fegley replaced Ben Greenstein as league president. Teams who planned to join on September 16 included, the Shamrock A.C., (Note: Previously St. Mary's Cats) Eleventh Ward, Ninth Ward, the Defiance Academy Bulldogs, the South Side-Eden Snappers, Hillside, and the Rockford Yellow Jackets. The Yellow Jackets did not join and were replaced by Parkside; they soon after left and were replaced by the "Hibernians".

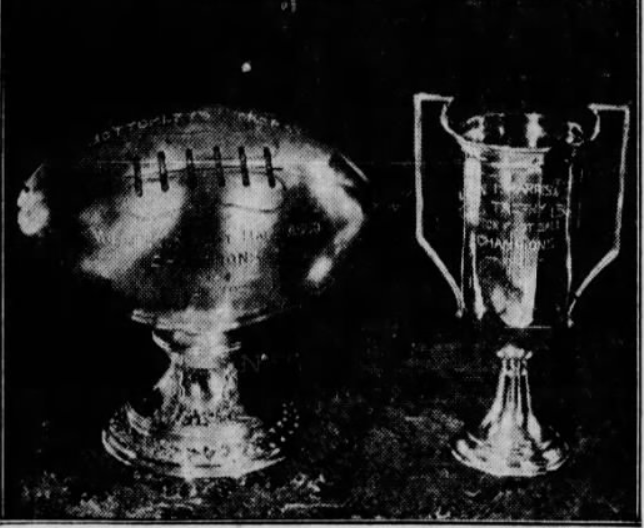
1924 Championship Trophies

By November 17, 1924, the Defiance Bulldogs led the league with a 7–0 record, second was Shamrock, and third was South Side. A possible deciding game on c. Dec. 1 between Defiance and South Side was called at 12–12 in total darkness. The teams protested the game and the arbitration board (George N. Boggs, Ben Greenstein (former president), and Joseph D. M'Laughlin) declared that the game would not count, due to errors in the officiating. By week 12 the Defiance Bulldogs (10–1) and South Side-Eden Snappers (10–2) were tied for 1st due to the standings running on points rather than win-loss percentage. A protest-play-off game was scheduled for January 3 between Defiance and South Side. The game was postponed due to the field being covered in snow. A meeting was held between the league officials a few days later. The Snappers won a game against Defiance on c. March 29 in front of 1,200 fans, making another game necessary to decide the league champions. Eventually the Shamrock A.C. were in position to play in the league championship and won against Defiance, 25 to 6. The Shamrock A.C. were awarded two championship trophies, one provided by Bottomley and Company, and the other by Norman I. Harris Jewelers.

Another league named "Wilmington Football Association" was founded in 1925. Shamrock, St. Ann's, St. Anthony's, and Eleventh Ward (Note: Shamrock and Eleventh Ward were from the previous league, while St. Ann's and St. Anthony's were new.) were the four teams reported to have joined. The third league folded on November 4, 1925, citing financial difficulties, and the inability to find another team after the folding of St. Ann's as causes. A final meeting was held on November 10.

== Season by season ==
=== 1929 season ===
The league was founded in September 1929. There were six teams in the first season, the Penn-Del A.A., Ninth Ward Ducks, Shamrock Reserves, Polish American Military Alliance (P.A.M.A.), Defiance Academy Bulldogs, and Kentmere Red Sox.

The rankings went on points instead of win-loss percentage. A win was worth two points and a tie was worth one.

The Penn-Del A.A. won the league title after posting an 8–1–1 record, scoring 17 points. It took until the last game of the season, a redo of a disputed game, for the A.A. to be named champions.

==== Results ====
1929 Wilmington Football League standings
Team	W	L	T	PCT
Penn-Del Athletic Association†	8	1	1	.850
Ninth Ward Ducks	6	2	2	.700
Polish American Military Alliance	4	3	3	.550
Defiance Academy Bulldogs	4	5	1	.450
Shamrock Reserve	1	6	3	.250
Kentmere Red Sox	1	8	1	.150

† Wilmington Football League champions.

=== 1930 season ===
Two teams left and two joined for the second season. The Shamrock Reserves and Ninth Ward Ducks left, and were replaced by the St. Mary's Cats and St. Anthony's Catholic Club, known more popularly as, the "Tonies".

Penn-Del won their second consecutive league title, beating the P.A.M.A. on Thanksgiving Day 6–0 for the league championship. They then played and won against the independent "First Engineers" to be named "Delaware champions".

==== Results ====
1930 Wilmington Football Association standings
Team	W	L	T	PCT
Penn-Del Athletic Association†	9	1	0	.900
Polish American Military Alliance	8	2	0	.800
Defiance Academy Bulldogs	4	4	2	.500
St. Mary's Cats	2	4	1	.357
Kentmere Red Sox	1	5	2	.250
St. Anthony's Catholic Club	0	5	3	.187

† Wilmington Football Association champions.

=== 1931 season ===
Results for the 1931 season have not been found. In mid-September a meeting was held to discuss plans of continuing the league. Representatives from each team were requested. Two other teams, Fort duPont and the Claymont Dragons, also had representatives.

Another meeting was held on September 29 at the Defiance Academy building.

By December 7, Penn-Del had only one loss with two games remaining and were considered a top team in the state championship race.

In a November 1932 article, it was stated that the "Eleventh Ward team, [were] champions of the 1931 Wilmington Football Association League".

=== 1932 season ===
In 1932 standings, six teams were listed in the "City Football League", the "Tonies", St. Ann's, Eighth Ward, Price's Run, the "Black Diamonds", and Brandywine Hawks. The "Tonies" were league champions.

However, another article stated the top team in the Wilmington Football Association was Eleventh Ward, meaning there were two Wilmington Leagues at the time. A few days later, an article about Penn-Del, champions in '29 and '30, said they were an independent team. It then described that they would play the Eleventh Ward Whitejackets, champions of the Wilmington Football Association, in a Thanksgiving game. Penn-Del won the game, 7 to 0.

In the Wilmington Football Association, there were four teams in the 1932 season, the Eleventh Ward Whitejackets, Defiance Bulldogs, St. Mary's Cats, and the Brandywine Athletic Association. Defiance and St. Mary's were the two teams from the 1930 season still in the league.

==== Results (WCFL) ====
Results of the Wilmington City Football League, as of week 8. (Note: 10 weeks were in the schedule. Listed below are the results in the first 8 games; results in the final two are incomplete)

1932 Wilmington City Football League standings
Team	W	L	T	PCT
St. Anthony's Catholic Club†	7	1	0	.875
St. Ann's	5	0	3	.812
Eighth Ward	4	0	4	.750
Price's Run	3	1	4	.625
Black Diamonds	3	0	5	.687
Brandywine Hawks	1	0	7	.562

† Wilmington City Football League champions.

==== Results (WFA) ====
Results of the Wilmington Football Association, as of week 4. (Note: Listed below are the results in the first 4 games; results in the rest are incomplete)

1932 Wilmington Football Association standings
Team	W	L	T	PCT
Eleventh Ward Whitejackets†	4	0	0	1.000
Defiance Bulldogs	2	1	1	.625
St. Mary's Cats	1	2	1	.375
Brandywine Athletic Association	0	0	4	.000

† Wilmington Football Association champions.

=== 1933 season ===
In the Wilmington Football Association, the Fifth Ward Democrats, Delaware Panthers, and Ninth Ward Ducks, a charter member of the league, all joined. The Brandywine Athletic Association left, however. The Eleventh Ward Whitejackets clinched their third consecutive league title by week 4.

In the Wilmington City League, one team left and two joined, bringing the league to 7 teams. The Brandywine Hawks left, while the South Side Terrapins and Defiance (not to be confused with the Defiance Bulldogs of the Wilmington Association) joined. The Black Diamonds won the league championship against Eighth Ward, winning 13 to 6.

==== Results (WFA) ====
Results of the Wilmington Football Association, as of week 4. (Note: Listed below are the results in the first 4 games; results in the others are incomplete.)

1933 Wilmington Football Association standings
Team	W	L	T	PCT
Eleventh Ward Whitejackets†	4	0	0	1.000
Delaware Panthers	2	1	1	.625
St. Mary's Cats	1	1	2	.500
Defiance Bulldogs	1	1	1	.500
Ninth Ward Ducks	0	2	0	.000

† Wilmington Football Association champions.
Note: The Fifth Ward Democrats (0–2–1) forfeited their franchise in week 4. The results of their games were removed from the standings.

==== Results (WCFL) ====
Standings for the 1933 Wilmington City Football League are unavailable.

=== 1934 season ===
In the Wilmington City Football League, four teams left, and one joined, bringing the total to the original number of four. The 1933 champion Black Diamonds left the league as well as Eighth Ward, Defiance, and St. Ann's. The remaining four teams were the South Side Terrapins, Price's Run, St. Anthony's Catholic Club, and the St. Mary's Cats, who joined from the Wilmington Association. The South Side Terrapins were named champions.

In the Wilmington Association, the Ninth Ward Ducks left for the second time, the St. Mary's Cats left for the City League, while the Brandywine Athletic Association who left the year prior, joined. Another team that joined were the newly formed "White Eagles". The rules were changed for there to be two championships, one for the first half of the season, and one for the second. In the first half playoffs the "White Eagles" got a bye, while the Brandywine A.A. and Eleventh Ward Whitejackets battled for the remaining spot in the championship. Eleventh Ward advanced, but lost to the White Eagles, 15 to 12. The White Eagles won the second half championship as well, winning 2–0 against the Defiance Bulldogs.

==== Results (WFA) ====
Results of the Wilmington Football Association, first half. (Note: Playoff results included)

1934 Wilmington Football Association standings
Team	W	L	T	PCT
White Eagles†	3	1	1	.700
Eleventh Ward Whitejackets	2	2	1	.500
Brandywine Athletic Association	1	2	1	.375
Defiance Bulldogs (Note: Sometimes called Defiance A.A.)	1	2	1	.375

† Wilmington Football Association champions (first half).
Results for the second half are unavailable.

==== Results (WCFL) ====
1934 Wilmington City Football League standings
Team	W	L	T	PCT
South Side Terrapins†	5	1	3	.722
Price's Run	4	2	3	.611
St. Anthony's Catholic Club	3	2	3	.562
St. Mary's Cats	0	8	0	.000

† Wilmington City Football League champions.

=== 1935 season ===
For the first time, the Wilmington Association had no changes, each team stayed. The season started on October 13 with the White Eagles and Eleventh Ward Blue Jackets (previously named Whitejackets) winning by 6 points. Eleventh Ward would win the first half championship as well as the second half. In a game to be named "Delaware State champions", the Blue Jackets lost to Fort duPont. They played a game against the Wilmington City League champion Tonies on December 15 and won on a game-winning safety near the end of the fourth quarter. After the Wilmington Association season was over, The News Journal published an All-Star team written by a fan.

In the City League, the St. Mary's Cats left, and the Brandywine Hawks, who had previously had a stint in the league, joined. The "Tonies" won the league championship against Price's Run. They compiled a record of 7–1–1.

==== Results (WFA) ====
Results for the 1935 Wilmington Football Association are unavailable.

==== Results (WCFL) ====
1935 Wilmington City Football League standings
Team	W	L	T	PCT
St. Anthony's Catholic Club†	7	1	1	.833
Price's Run	5	3	1	.611
South Side Athletic Club (Note: Previously named "South Side Terrapins")	4	4	0	.500
Brandywine Hawks	0	8	0	.000

† Wilmington City Football League champions.

==== "All-Association" team ====
===== First team =====
- Left End: E. Pennock, Eleventh Ward
- Left Tackle: Lavan, Defiance
- Left Guard: Elliott, White Eagles
- Center: S. Fahey, Defiance
- Right Guard: Cross, Brandywine
- Right Tackle: Malice, Eleventh Ward
- Right End: J. Pennock, Eleventh Ward
- Quarterback: Smith, Eleventh Ward
- Left Halfback: Ziggy, Eleventh Ward
- Right Halfback: Haley, Defiance
- Fullback: Steck, White Eagles

===== Second Team =====
- Left End: O'Connor, Defiance
- Left Tackle: Lundberg, Eleventh Ward
- Left Guard: Finochi, Eleventh Ward
- Center: Burowski, White Eagles
- Right Guard: Nash, Eleventh Ward
- Right Tackle: Shenton, White Eagles
- Right End: Manista, White Eagles
- Quarterback: Ademski, Defiance
- Left Halfback: Drennen, Eleventh Ward
- Right Halfback: Miske, Eleventh Ward
- Fullback: Koppe, Brandywine

=== 1936 season ===
In September 1936, the Wilmington Football Association and Wilmington City League merged. An article by The Morning News stated that six teams were planned. The Eleventh Ward Blue Jackets, Price Run A.A. (who had absorbed the Brandywine Hawks), Defiance Bulldogs, and Newark were already entered. The Tonies were considered "almost certain" to join, and either Kennett Square or Marcus Hook would get the last spot in the league. The White Eagles, Brandywine A.A., and South Side A.C. dropped out.

A second meeting was held the following week. The News Journal reported that Price Run, St. Anthony's, Eleventh Ward, and Defiance had been entered while Newark was "likely" to join and a sixth team was still being sought.

On September 29, The Morning News reported that "Inability to secure a fourth team will probably result in the disbandment of the Wilmington Football Association for this season.". It also stated that at a meeting on the previous night, only three teams (St. Anthony's "Tonies", Price's Run A.A., and Eleventh Ward Whitejackets) intended to join. A day later the season was called "out of the question" by a Morning News article.

=== 1937–1939 seasons ===
Results for the 1937–1939 seasons have not been found. Though the teams continued, articles would not mention whether or not they were part of the league.

A November 1937 article by The Morning News reported that the Tonies won the "City Grid Crown" after defeating the Eleventh Ward Blue Jackets 7–0.

In 1938, the Eleventh Ward Blue Jackets claimed the city title over St. Anthony's while the Defiance Bulldogs won against the Price Run Raiders for the second class championship.

The Tonies won the "state semi-pro title" in 1939, winning 26–6 against Defiance.

=== 1940 season ===
The league was reorganized in 1940. An article by The Morning News reported that seven teams were entered. They were the Price Run Red Raiders, Parkside, St. Mary's Cats, Brandywine, Fairview Owls, St. Anthony's C. Y. O. (Note: The "Tonies") and St. Joseph's Boy's Club. Brandywine left the league before the season started, bring the league down to six teams.

Two playoff games were held before the league championship, with Price Run winning 10–6 against St. Joseph's, and St. Anthony's winning against Fairview. (Note: The first playoff game between St. Anthony's and Fairview ended in a tie, they played again a week later, with St. Anthony's winning. While waiting to see a championship opponent, Price Run played a game against the independent St. Elizabeth Gaels.)

The Price Run Red Raiders won the league championship, 13–0, against St. Anthony's. It ended a perfect 12–0 season for the Red Raiders, the best ever record by a Wilmington Association team.

==== Results ====
Results, excluding playoffs.

1940 Wilmington Football Association standings
Team	W	L	T	PCT
Price Run Red Raiders†	8	0	0	1.000
St. Anthony's Catholic Club	5	3	1	.625
Fairview Owls	5	4	0	.555
St. Joseph's	4	3	2	.555
Parkside	1	7	1	.167
St. Mary's Cats	1	7	0	.125

† Wilmington Football Association champions.

===== Playoffs =====
Semi-Finals
December 8 – Second & DuPont
St. Anthony's (Note: The two teams had previously played to a tie on December 1)	6
Fairview	0
December 1
Price Run	10
St. Joseph's	6

Championship
December 15 – Wilmington Park
St. Anthony's	0
Price Run	13

=== 1941 season ===
One team left and two joined for the '41 season. The St. Mary's Cats left, while the Wilmington All-Stars and Defiance Bulldogs joined. The Defiance team was the last original member of the league, as well as only member of the 1922–1924 league still active.

In the playoffs Defiance was matched against Fairview and Parkside against St. Anthony's. Defiance and Parkside won, leading them to the league championship. In the championship, they played to a scoreless tie in front of "a large crowd". They scheduled another game for the next week. In a very long game, that included eight periods, the teams "called it quits" after another 0–0 tie. Shortly afterwards, they agreed to be named co-champions rather than "battle the weather for another week to be named champions."

==== Results ====
Results for the 1941 season are unavailable.

===== Playoffs =====
Semi-Finals
November 28 – Second & DuPont
Defiance	30
Fairview	6
November 28 – Price Run
Parkside	3
St. Anthony's Catholic Club	0

1st Championship
December 7
Defiance	0
Parkside	0

2nd Championship
December 14 – Second & DuPont
Defiance	0
Parkside	0

=== 1942–1945 seasons ===
Seasons from 1942 to 1945 were cancelled due to World War II.

=== 1946 season ===
The league reorganized again in 1946, renaming itself "Wilmington Football League", rather than Association. Three divisions were planned, the open division, were players of all ages could play, the intermediate division, for players under 16, and the senior division, for players under 19. 24 players were allowed per team. No players could play in the league if they played high school or college at the time.

In the first meeting held on September 4, ten teams planned to join. Five of the teams intended to join the open division, Price Run (represented by Paul Coyle), Rodney Rams (represented by John O'Toole), St. Anthony's C. Y. O. (Note: The "Tonies") (represented by Dominic Voly), West Side Indians (represented by William Henry), and Fairview Owls (represented by Frank DiGiacomo). Dominic Voly also submitted an application for St. Anthony's in the senior division and John Leonard applied Price Run in division. "Stapler" (represented by Pete Kindbeiter) and "George Gray Alumni" (represented by Nick Cerasari and Ben Scott) were the teams entered in the intermediate division.

The teams that ended up in the open division were the St. Anthony's C. Y. O., Defiance A.A., (Note: Previously Bulldogs) Fairview Owls, (Note: Renamed VFW 3257 mid-season.) West Side Indians, Delaware Gypsies, and VFW 615. Price Run, the Adams Athletic Club, Wilmington Manor, and Happy Valley joined the senior division. Teams in the intermediate division are unknown.

In the open division, the Fairview Owls (VFW 3257) won the first half championship before being disqualified in the second half for using an ineligible player. League president Jim Tyler declared that the Defiance A.A. would be named second half champions, replacing Fairview. The Owls protested the decision, claiming that Tyler was not elected president by the teams, and therefore has no power.

In the senior division, Happy Valley and Adams tied for the league lead at the end of the season. A tie-breaker championship was played on December 8 with Happy Valley winning, 13–0. 1,329 fans were in attendance, including City Council President James A. LeFevre and Municipal Court Judge Thomas Herlihy, Jr.

==== Results ====
Results for the 1946 Wilmington Football League season are unavailable.

===== Playoff =====
Championship
December 8 – Wilmington Park
Happy Valley	13
Adams	0

=== 1947 season ===
On August 20, a meeting was held with nine teams being represented. Nine teams joined the league in the open and senior divisions; teams in the intermediate division are unknown. In the senior division, the only movement was Wilmington Manor leaving. In the open division, the VFW 3257 and VFW 615 left, and were replaced by the Polish Eagles and Cutrona's Market.

In the senior division, Happy Valley won the league title. The Tonies, of the open division, went undefeated, posting a 9–0–1 record, winning both the first and second half championships.

==== Results ====
Results of the open division, first half.

1947 Wilmington Football League standings
Team	W	L	T	PCT
St. Anthony's Catholic Club†	5	0	0	1.000
Defiance Athletic Association	3	2	0	.600
West Side Indians	2	2	1	.500
Cutrona's Market	2	3	0	.400
Delaware Gypsies	1	3	1	.300
Polish Eagles	1	4	0	.200

† Wilmington Football League champions.
Results of the open division, second half. (Note: Note: This standings table is missing 2 games.)

1947 Wilmington Football League standings
Team	W	L	T	PCT
St. Anthony's Catholic Club†	4	0	1	.900
Cutrona's Market	3	1	0	.750
Delaware Gypsies	2	2	0	.500
Defiance Athletic Association	1	1	2	.500
West Side Indians	0	3	2	.200
Polish Eagles	0	3	1	.125

† Wilmington Football League champions.

=== 1948 season ===
The league was reorganized on September 2, 1948. At the meeting, the open and senior divisions became the "Eastern" and "Western" Divisions. The Delaware Gypsies and Price Run Red Raiders left, and Lorraine joined.

The Tonies and Polish Eagles won their divisions, and a playoff game for the league championship was then scheduled. In the championship, at Wilmington Park, the Polish Eagles won 7–0 after a game winning rushing touchdown late in the fourth quarter. Afterwards the Eagles scheduled a match against the Dover Bulldogs, to be named "state semi-pro champions". They won, 7–0, before a crowd of 2,000 at Wilmington Park.

==== Results ====
1948 Wilmington Football League standings
Eastern Division
Team	W	L	T	PCT
Polish Eagles†	7	3	0	.700
Lorraine	6	4	0	.600
West Side Indians	4	5	1	.450
Adams Athletic Club	0	9	1	.050
Western Division
Team	W	L	T	PCT
St. Anthony's Catholic Club‡	7	3	0	.700
Defiance Athletic Association	6	4	0	.600
Cutrona's Market	5	3	2	.600
Happy Valley	2	6	2	.300

† Wilmington Football League champions.
‡ Won division.

===== Playoff =====
Championship
December 5 – Wilmington Park
Polish Eagles	7
St. Anthony's	0

=== 1949 season ===
A meeting was held on September 6 with W. Frank Newlin elected president and James B. Tyler secretary. The league was sponsored by Park Recreation Department. Teams represented at the meeting included the Adams A. C., Polish Eagles, Cutrona's All-Stars, St. Anthony's, Lorraine, Happy Valley, West Side Indians, and Fairview Owls.

In mid-September another meeting was held with eight teams entering the league. The Polish Eagles, the previous season's champions, left to play independently. Accepted into the league's '49 season were Cutrona's All-Stars, Happy Valley, Fairview Owls, Defiance, Adams A. C., West Side Indians, St. Anthony's, and Lorraine.

The Tonies, led by coach Dom Carucci, went undefeated, posting seven straight victories winning the league title. The Tonies then scheduled a match against the Dover Bulldogs to be named "state semi-pro champions". The game, held at 8:30 p.m., November 25, in Dover Park, was postponed to November 29 after driving rain. In the postponed game, the Tonies dominated the Bulldogs, shutting them out 32–0 for the state championship.

==== Results ====
Results, as of week 6.

1949 Wilmington Football League standings
Team	W	L	T	PCT
St. Anthony's Catholic Club†	6	0	0	1.000
Defiance Athletic Association	4	1	1	.750
Happy Valley	4	2	0	.666
Fairview Owls	3	1	2	.666
Lorraine	2	2	2	.500
West Side Indians	1	4	1	.250
Cutrona's All-Stars	1	5	0	.166
Adams Athletic Club	0	6	0	.000

† Wilmington Football League champions.

=== 1950 season ===
In a meeting held on September 12, at Park Board offices, eight teams planned to join. Defending champion St. Anthony's, Happy Valley A. C., Lorraine, Fairview Owls, Defiance, West Side Indians, VFW 615, and Adams A. C. all were represented. The season was planned to start on October 1, with all games being played on Sundays. On September 20 a meeting was held and one extra team was admitted to the league, the Conrad Alumni. The team was composed of Conrad High School graduates.

On November 2, Lorraine withdrew from the league after several key players were injured.

The Defiance A. A. were named champions on December 3 following a victory vs. St. Anthony's, before 1,100 fans.

==== Results ====
1950 Wilmington Football League standings
Team	W	L	T	PCT
Defiance Athletic Association†	8	0	0	1.000
Conrad Alumni	5	2	1	.687
West Side Indians	5	2	1	.687
St. Anthony's Catholic Club	4	1	1	.750 (Note: The league went on points rather than win percentage. A win was worth 2, tie worth 1, and loss worth 0.)
Fairview Owls	3	4	0	.428
Happy Valley	2	3	1	.416
VFW 615	2	5	0	.285
Adams Athletic Club	0	6	0	.000
Lorraine	0	8 (Note: Includes four forfeits following their withdrawal from the league.)	0	.000

† Wilmington Football League champions.

=== 1951 season ===
In meetings held in September 1951, five of the 1950 teams left, and one joined. The only 1950 teams still in the league were St. Anthony's (who joined in the final meeting), Defiance, Conrad Alumni, and West Side Indians. Lorraine, Adams, Happy Valley, VFW 615, and Fairview all left. The "National Guards" joined.

The Conrad Alumni, in their second season, clinched the league championship after posting a 7–1 record. They then were scheduled to play in the eighth annual "Mushroom Bowl" on Sons of Italy Field at Kennett Square. The game, played before 1,200 fans, finished with a score of 0–0.

==== Results ====
Results, as of November 26. (Note: Results may be incomplete.)

1951 Wilmington Football League standings
Team	W	L	T	PCT
Conrad Alumni†	7	1	0	.875
Defiance Athletic Association	4	1	1	.750
National Guard	3	4	0	.428
West Side Indians	1	4	1	.250
St. Anthony's Catholic Club	0	5	0	.000

† Wilmington Football League champions.

=== 1952 season ===
Though in early September the league was considered doubtful to continue, and "appeared headed towards the scrap-pile", it gained four new teams. It brought the league to a record nine squads, including its first two from Pennsylvania. The Marcus Hook A. A. and Kennett Square Crusaders were the two Pennsylvanian teams, joining the also new Claymont A. A. and New Castle Tonies. The league now included the four additions, and five 1951 holdover clubs: the Conrad Alumni, National Guard, Wilmington Tonies, Defiance Bulldogs, and West Side Indians. Around that time the league's president, Frank Newlin, retired, and was replaced by Phil Gordon. Bob Dickerson was named league secretary.

Shortly after the New Castle Tonies joined, the Wilmington Tonies, the second-oldest team in the league and last surviving member of the 1925 Wilmington Football Association, left. The New Castle County Air Base immediately replaced them. Also leaving was the Claymont A. A., before even playing a game.

The season's final regular season game was between the Marcus Hook A. A., and Conrad Alumni, both undefeated. The Marcus Hook team "thumped" Conrad, winning 38–7, capping off an undefeated 7–0 season. Afterwards they played the league's all star team, winning 40–0 in front of 1,000 fans at Wilmington Park.

==== All-Star Team ====
- Ends: Strusowski, Peden (St. Anthony's); Logullo (Conrad); M. Segich (Defiance); Rush (West Side)
- Tackles: Cycyk, Mammavella, Zoli (Kennett Square); Hughes, Purple (New Castle); Hoagland (National Guard)
- Guards: Perna (St. Anthony's); L. Segich (Defiance); Bullow, O'Neill (Conrad); Chapman (New Castle)
- Centers: Sutton (St. Anthony's); Chapman (2) (New Castle)
- Backs (Defense): Pucy, Kennett, DiAngelo (St. Anthony's); Watson, Jones (West Side); King, Lanouette (New Castle)
- Backs (Offense): Kempski, Taylor, Morris (Conrad); Knox, Gordon (National Guard); McMasters (Defiance)
- Managers: Jess Malin, Buddy Clark (Conrad)

=== 1953 season ===
The Wilmington Football League's first 1953 meeting was held on September 2, at Huber's Sporting Goods. In the following weeks the league dropped down to six teams, following the addition of the Adams A.C. and dropping out by the New Castle Tonies, Defiance Bulldogs, and West Side Indians. The Defiance team was the last original member of the league, as well as the oldest league member and last surviving team of a predecessor league. The six league teams were the: Marcus Hook A. A., New Castle County Air Base, the Kennett Square Crusaders, the Adams A.C., the National Guard, and the Conrad Alumni.

The Marcus Hook A. A. clinched their second consecutive league title following a Conrad Alumni victory over the Air Base. The Conrad game, won by a game-winning touchdown pass with seconds remaining, eliminated New Castle from the championship contention as well as gave Marcus Hook the league crown. Though the victory tied Conrad with Marcus Hook at the end of the season, the Alumni team was forced to vacate two wins following the use of an ineligible player.

=== 1954 season ===
A September 1954 article by The News Journal wrote, "[The] Wilmington Football League, [is] now assured of six teams with [the] Kennett Square Crusaders' decision to enter a team again this year." The league was scheduled to start in the second week of October and play a 10-game schedule. The teams entered by September 16 were the: Kennett Square Crusaders, National Guard, Marine Reserves, Adams, A.C., Conrad Alumni, and Wilmington Tonies. The Tonies, returning after a two-year absence, were the last surviving member of a predecessor league, following the withdrawal from the league of the Defiance Bulldogs. The Marcus Hook A. A. and Air Base left. The Marine Reserves would also leave, before the season started, bringing it down to five teams.

According to a November 1955 article by The New Journal, the Kennett Square Crusaders were named league champions.

=== 1955 season ===
The 1955 season would be the league's nineteenth and final year. The Tonies, the oldest league member, left, and was replaced by Claymont. The five teams in the league's final season were the: Conrad Alumni, Kennett Square Crusaders, Claymont, Adams A.C., and National Guard.

The Conrad Alumni went undefeated, posting a 7–0 record to win the league's final title.

The league folded after this season.

== Champions ==
- 1922: Defiance Bulldogs
- 1923: Defiance Bulldogs (2)
- 1924: Shamrock Athletic Club
- 1925: No Champion
- 1926–1928: No League
- 1929: Penn-Del Athletic Association
- 1930: Penn-Del Athletic Association (2)
- 1931: Eleventh Ward Whitejackets
- 1932 (WCFL): St. Anthony's Catholic Club
- 1932 (WFA): Eleventh Ward Whitejackets (2)
- 1933 (WCFL): Black Diamonds
- 1933 (WFA): Eleventh Ward Whitejackets (3)
- 1934 (WCFL): South Side Terrapins
- 1934 (WFA): White Eagles (1st & 2nd Halves)
- 1935 (WCFL): St. Anthony's Catholic Club (2)
- 1935 (WFA): Eleventh Ward Blue Jackets (1st & 2nd Halves) (4)
- 1936–1939: No League
- 1940: Price Run Red Raiders
- 1941: Defiance Bulldogs (3) & Parkside
- 1942–1945: No League
- 1946 (Open Division): Fairview Owls (1st Half); Defiance Bulldogs/Athletic Association (2nd Half) (3.5)
- 1946 (Senior Division): Happy Valley
- 1947 (Open Division): St. Anthony's Catholic Club (1st & 2nd Halves) (3)
- 1947 (Senior Division): Happy Valley (2)
- 1948: Polish Eagles
- 1949: St. Anthony's Catholic Club (4)
- 1950: Defiance Athletic Association (4.5)
- 1951: Conrad Alumni
- 1952: Marcus Hook Athletic Association
- 1953: Marcus Hook Athletic Association (2)
- 1954: Kennett Square Crusaders
- 1955: Conrad Alumni (2)

== Notable players ==
- Nick Bucci
- Ed Michaels
- John Tosi
