= CD2 =

Cell adhesion molecule found on the surface of T cells and natural killer

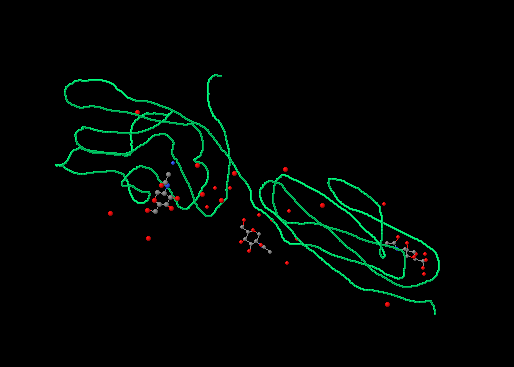

Identifiers
- Aliases: CD2, LFA-2, SRBC, T11, CD2 molecule
- External IDs: OMIM: 186990; MGI: 88320; GeneCards: CD2
Available structures
PDB	Ortholog search: PDBe RCSB
PDB	List of PDB id codes 1CDB, 1GYA, 1HNF, 1L2Z, 1QA9, 2J6O, 2J7I

Gene location (Human)
Chr.	Chromosome 1 (human)
Band	1p13.1	Start	116,754,430 bp
Band	1p13.1	End	116,769,229 bp

Gene location (Mouse)
Chr.	Chromosome 3 (mouse)
Band	3 F2.2|3 44.17 cM	Start	101,183,215 bp
Band	3 F2.2|3 44.17 cM	End	101,195,255 bp
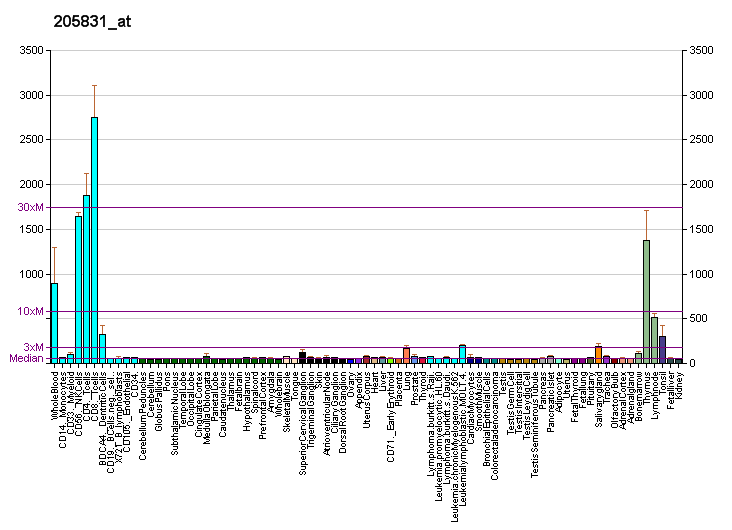
RNA expression pattern
Bgee	Human / Mouse (ortholog); Top expressed in: granulocyte; thymus; lymph node; testicle; appendix; blood; epithelium of nasopharynx; superficial temporal artery; spleen; mucosa of ileum / Top expressed in: thymus; mesenteric lymph nodes; spleen; blood; right lung lobe; subcutaneous adipose tissue; embryo; ankle joint; embryo; granulocyte; More reference expression data
BioGPS	More reference expression data
Gene ontology
Molecular function	protein homodimerization activity; protein binding; signaling receptor binding; signaling receptor activity; antigen binding; protein kinase binding; receptor tyrosine kinase binding; protein self-association
Cellular component	integral component of membrane; membrane; cell-cell junction; anchored component of plasma membrane; integral component of plasma membrane; extracellular region; cell surface; cytoplasmic side of plasma membrane; external side of plasma membrane; plasma membrane; protein-containing complex; membrane raft
Biological process	positive regulation of myeloid dendritic cell activation; heterotypic cell-cell adhesion; natural killer cell activation; membrane raft polarization; cell surface receptor signaling pathway; cell adhesion; positive regulation of tumor necrosis factor production; T cell activation; leukocyte migration; regulation of T cell differentiation; apoptotic process; cell-cell adhesion
Sources:Amigo / QuickGO
Orthologs
Databases	NCBI: entry; OMA: entry
Species	Human	Mouse
Entrez	914	12481
Ensembl	ENSG00000116824	ENSMUSG00000027863
UniProt	P06729; Q53F96	P08920
RefSeq (mRNA)	NM_001767; NM_001328609	NM_013486
RefSeq (protein)	NP_001315538; NP_001758; NP_001758.2	NP_038514
Location (UCSC)	Chr 1: 116.75 – 116.77 Mb	Chr 3: 101.18 – 101.2 Mb
PubMed search
- Wikidata
View/Edit Human	View/Edit Mouse

CD2 (cluster of differentiation 2) is a cell adhesion molecule found on the surface of T cells and natural killer (NK) cells. It has also been called T-cell surface antigen T11/Leu-5, LFA-2, LFA-3 receptor, erythrocyte receptor and rosette receptor.

== Function ==
It interacts with other adhesion molecules, such as lymphocyte function-associated antigen-3 (LFA-3/CD58) in humans, or CD48 in rodents, which are expressed on the surfaces of other cells.

In addition to its adhesive properties, CD2 also acts as a co-stimulatory molecule on T and NK cells.

=== Diagnostic relevance ===
CD2 is a specific marker for T cells and NK cells, and can therefore be used in immunohistochemistry to identify the presence of such cells in tissue sections. The great majority of T cell lymphomas and leukaemias also express CD2, making it possible to use the presence of the antigen to distinguish these conditions from B cell neoplasms.

== Classification ==
Due to its structural characteristics, CD2 is a member of the immunoglobulin superfamily; it possesses two immunoglobulin-like domains in its extracellular portion.

== Interactions ==
CD2 has been shown to interact with CD2BP2, Lck and PSTPIP1.
