= Immunoevasin =

Immunoevasins are proteins expressed by some viruses that enable the virus to evade immune recognition by interfering with MHC I complexes in the infected cell, therefore blocking the recognition of viral protein fragments by CD8^{+} cytotoxic T lymphocytes. Less frequently, MHC II antigen presentation and induced-self molecules may also be targeted. Some viral immunoevasins block peptide entry into the endoplasmic reticulum (ER) by targeting the TAP transporters. Immunoevasins are particularly abundant in viruses that are capable of establishing long-term infections of the host, such as herpesviruses.

== Mechanism ==
Each step in the peptide loading and presentation on MHC I (or MHC II) is a potential target for viral immunoevasins. These can range from targeting MHC I for lysosomal or cytoplasmic degradation, blocking TCR recognition of MHC I, inhibition of peptide transport into the ER or retention of MHC I in the ER or pre-Golgi. For MHC II, the possible evasion routes include MHC II-peptide assembly disruption, evading TCR recognition, MHC II degradation, and, conversely, CD4 co-receptor downregulation. Prevention of NK cell activation may also be triggered by inhibition of presentation of induced-self molecules (ligands of NKG2D) or self molecules (MHC I) presentation (while also preventing the interaction with cytotoxic T lymphocytes).

== Examples ==
=== Herpes simplex virus (HSV-1 and HSV-2) ===
HSV produces a protein, ICP47, that binds to cytosolic surface of TAP, preventing peptides from ever entering the ER, which prevents the cascade reaction that leads to presenting the MHC complex on the cell surface.

=== Human cytomegalovirus (HCMV) ===
Conversely to the HSV-1, the ATP-binding of TAP is inhibited by HCMV US6 protein, indirectly resulting in decreased peptide transport to ER. Retention of MHC I in the ER and possibly also inhibition of tapasin function may be attributed to US3 protein. US2 and US11 proteins forward newly-synthesized MHC I to degradation in cytoplasm by dislocating the MHC I from the ER membrane into the cytosol. UL16 is able to bind induced-self molecules MICB, ULBP1 and ULBP2, ligands for NKG2D on NK cells. Other immunoevasins, such as UL40, UL18, UL141, UL142 and pp65 also play a role in evading NK cell recognition.

=== Murine cytomegalovirus (MCMV) ===
In MCMV infection, m152 protein is capable of withholding MHC I in ER-Golgi intermediate compartment (ERGIC). Together with the rest of m145 family, the proteins can also downregulate ligands of NKG2D, a group of induced-self receptors on NK cells. m06/gp48 protein binds to MHC I with the help of adaptor protein complex and directs it for lysosomal degradation from the secretory pathway. Another protein of MCMV, m04/gp34, can attach to MHC I in ER and, upon transport to the cell membrane, hinders the interaction of MHC I with TCR on cytotoxic T cells while inhibiting NK cell activation and cytotoxicity by exhibiting MHC I molecules on cell surface. However, additional viral proteins may be required for successful transport of m04-bound MHC I to the cell membrane.

=== Varicella zoster virus (VZV) ===
VZV protein ORF66 is, similarly to m152 protein in MCMV, responsible for MHC I retention in ERGIC.

=== Kaposi's sarcoma-associated herpesvirus (KSHV) ===
KSHV proteins K3 and K5 increase the rate of endocytosis and subsequent degradation of MHC I from cell membrane.

=== Human immunodeficiency virus (HIV) ===
Nef protein is capable of directly binding to cytosolic regions of MHC I and targeting them for degradation in lysosomes from trans-Golgi. Nef and Vpu proteins can also direct CD4 co-receptor for lysosomal (Nef) or cytosolic proteasomal (Vpu) degradation, affecting the recognition of MHC II-bound peptides.

=== Human herpesvirus 7 (HHV-7) ===
Protein U21 is responsible for targeting MHC I from the secretory pathway for lysosomal degradation.

=== Epstein-Barr virus (EBV) ===
MHC II molecule (HLA-DR) acts as a co-receptor for the EBV entry into the cell upon binding the gp42 viral protein. Upon proteolytic cleavage and secretion of gp42, the protein can bind to MHC II, hindering the interaction with CD4+ T helper lymphocytes. BNLF2a protein, which is present only in the replicative phase of the viral life cycle, functions as an inhibitor of TAP, blocking both peptide and ATP binding.

=== Adenovirus 5 ===
The inhibition of interaction between TAP and tapasin (needed for peptide loading on the MHC I), as well as retention of MHC I in the ER, is accomplished by adenoviral E19 protein.

=== Murine herpesvirus 68 (MHV-68) ===
The protein mK3 acts in a multitude of ways, including TAP complex destabilization and dislocation of MHC I to cytoplasm.

=== Other ===
TAP function can also be inhibited by UL49.5 protein produced by bovine herpesvirus 1, pseudorabies virus, and equine herpesvirus 1.

== Research and therapeutic significance ==
Thanks to the research on immunoevasins, several molecular mechanisms were clarified, such as MHC I processing mechanism, TAP-independent peptide presentation, MHC I peptide-loading complex (PLC)-independent antigen presentation pathways, cross-presentation and ER-associated degradation (ERAD). In the future, the use or knockouts of immunoevasins (where mutated or deleted immunoevasin genes would not interfere with antigen presentation on MHC I complexes upon viral infection, resulting in recognition and targeting of infected cells by T cells) may be used for vaccine development for HCMV, gene therapy, transplantation and tumor-specific immunotherapy.
