= Human cytomegalovirus =

Species of virus

- Specialty: Infectious disease

Human cytomegalovirus
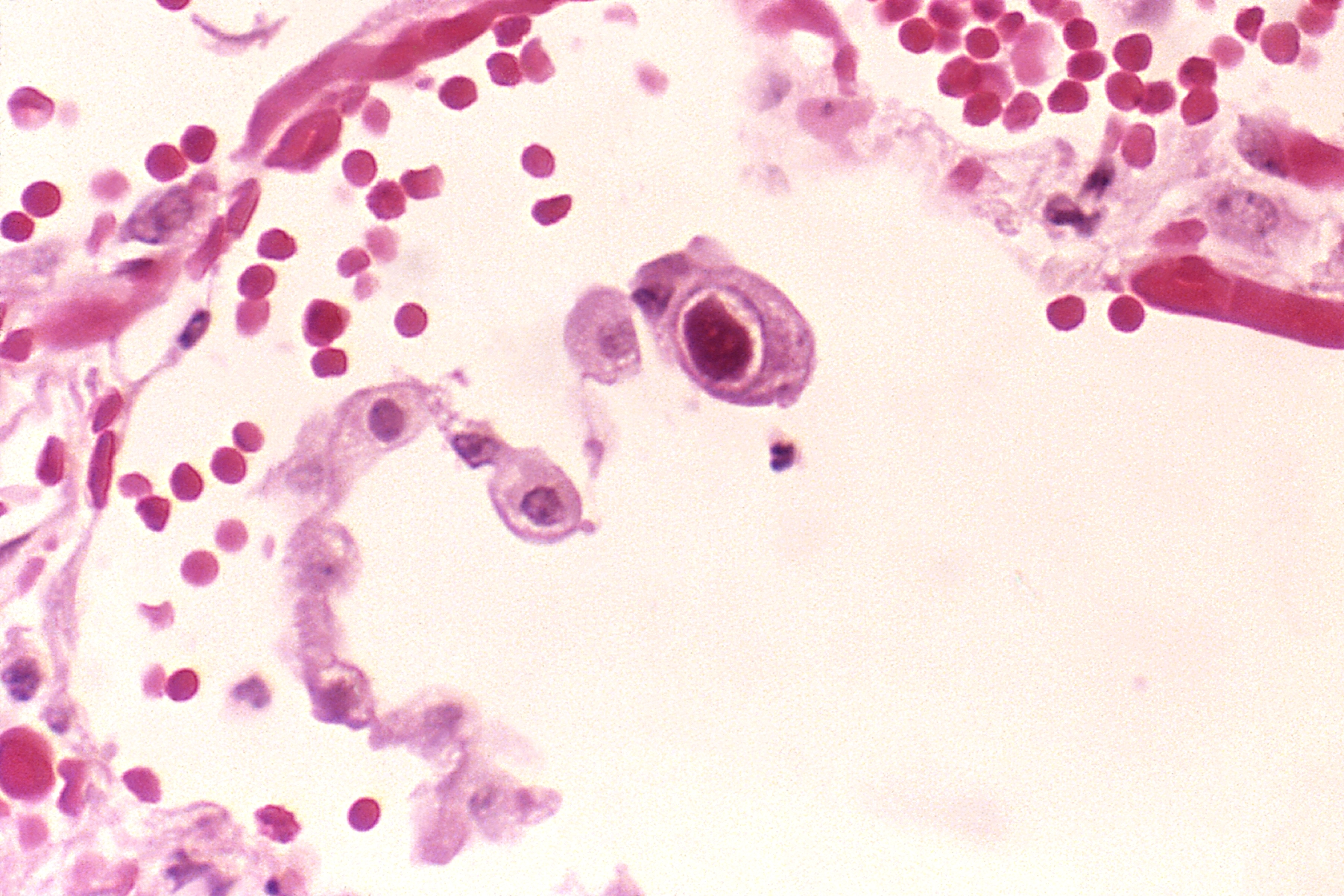
- CMV infection of a human lung pneumocyte

Virus classification
- (unranked): Virus
- Realm: Duplodnaviria
- Kingdom: Heunggongvirae
- Phylum: Peploviricota
- Class: Herviviricetes
- Order: Herpesvirales
- Family: Orthoherpesviridae
- Genus: Cytomegalovirus
- Species: Cytomegalovirus humanbeta5

Synonyms
- Human betaherpesvirus 5; Human herpesvirus 5

Human cytomegalovirus (HCMV), also called human herpesvirus 5 (HHV-5), is a species of virus in the genus Cytomegalovirus, which in turn is a member of the viral family known as Herpesviridae or herpesviruses. It is also commonly called CMV. Within Herpesviridae, HCMV belongs to the Betaherpesvirinae subfamily, which also includes cytomegaloviruses from other mammals. CMV is a double-stranded DNA virus.

Although they may be found throughout the body, HCMV infections are frequently associated with the salivary glands. HCMV infection is typically unnoticed in healthy people, but can be life-threatening for the immunocompromised, such as HIV-infected persons, organ transplant recipients, or newborn infants. Congenital cytomegalovirus infection can lead to significant morbidity and even death. After infection, HCMV remains latent within the body throughout life and can be reactivated at any time. Eventually, it may cause mucoepidermoid carcinoma and possibly other malignancies such as prostate cancer, breast cancer, ovarian cancer and glioblastoma.

HCMV is found in all geographic locations and all socioeconomic groups, and infects between 60% and 70% of adults in the first world and almost 100% in the third world. Of all herpes viruses, HCMV harbors the most genes dedicated to altering (evading) innate and adaptive host immunity and represents a lifelong burden of antigenic T cell surveillance and immune dysfunction. Commonly it is indicated by the presence of antibodies in the general population. Seroprevalence is age-dependent: 58.9% of individuals aged 6 and older are infected with CMV, while 90.8% of individuals aged 80 and older are positive for HCMV. HCMV is also the virus most frequently transmitted to a developing fetus. HCMV infection is more widespread in developing countries and in communities with lower socioeconomic status and represents the most significant viral cause of birth defects in industrialized countries. Congenital HCMV is the leading infectious cause of deafness, learning disabilities, and intellectual disability in children. CMV also "seems to have a large impact on immune parameters in later life and may contribute to increased morbidity and eventual mortality."

== Signs and symptoms ==
Human cytomegalovirus infection has a classic triad of symptoms: fever, peaking in the late afternoon or early evening; pharyngitis, usually exudative; and symmetrical adenopathy.

== Virology ==
=== Transmission ===
The mode of HCMV transmission from person to person is unknown, but is presumed to occur through bodily fluids, including saliva, urine, blood, and tears. Cytomegalovirus is most commonly transmitted through kissing and sexual intercourse. It can also be transferred from an infected mother to her unborn child. Infection requires close, intimate contact with a person secreting the virus in their saliva, urine, or other bodily fluids. CMV can be transmitted sexually and via breast milk, and also occurs through receiving transplanted organs or blood transfusions. Although HCMV is not highly contagious, it has been shown to spread in households and among young children in day care centers.

=== Replication ===
HCMV replicates within infected endothelial cells at a slow rate, taking about five days in cell culture. It also infects fibroblasts, which requires expression of only a trimeric viral receptor complex, rather than the full pentameric complex that is required for infection of endothelial and epithelial cells. Like other herpesviruses, HCMV expresses genes in a temporally controlled manner. Immediate early genes (expressed 0–4 hours after infection) are involved in the regulation of transcription, followed by early genes (expressed 4–48 hours after infection) which are involved in viral DNA replication and further transcriptional regulation. Late genes are expressed during the remainder of infection up to viral egress and typically code for structural proteins. While HCMV encodes for its own functional DNA polymerase, the virus makes use of the host RNA polymerase for the transcription of all of its genes.

In disseminated cytomegalovirus infections, as may be seen in the context of an immunosuppressed host, the virus is readily transmitted between polymorphonuclear leukocytes (PM-NLs) and endothelial cells. Infected endothelial cells produce cytokines that attract PM-NLs, which then adhere to the endothelium by interactions between their CD18-containing cell surface integrins and the endothelial-expressed ICAM-1. Microfusions between the cells then take place in a manner dependent on expression of the viral gene locus UL128L.

Synthesis of the viral double-stranded DNA genome occurs at the host cell nucleus within specialized viral replication compartments.

Nearly 75% of the genes encoded by HCMV strain AD169 can be deleted and still result in the production of infectious virus. This suggests that the virus focuses on avoiding the host immune system for a timely entrance into latency.

== At-risk populations ==
CMV infections are most significant in the perinatal period and in people who are immunocompromised.

=== Pregnancy and congenital infection ===
HCMV is one of the vertically transmitted infections that lead to congenital abnormalities. (Others are: toxoplasmosis, rubella and herpes simplex.) Congenital HCMV infection occurs when the mother has a primary infection during pregnancy.

Up to 5 of every 1,000 live births are infected. Five percent develop multiple disabilities, and develop cytomegalic inclusion disease with nonspecific signs that resemble rubella. Another five percent later develop cerebral calcification (decreasing IQ levels dramatically and causing sensorineural deafness and psychomotor retardation).

However, infants born preterm and infected with HCMV after birth may experience cognitive and motor impairments later in life.

=== Immunocompromised adults ===
CMV infection or reactivation in people whose immune systems are compromised—for example, people who have received transplants or are significantly burned—causes illness and increases the risk of death.

HCMV infection involving the gastrointestinal tract represents a leading cause of morbidity and mortality among kidney transplant recipients. Signs and symptoms of the disease may be variable. Prompt anti-viral therapy administration and changes in immunosuppression are key factors for optimizing its management.

CMV reactivation is commonly seen in people with severe colitis.

Specific disease entities recognized in those people are

- CMV hepatitis, which may cause fulminant liver failure
- cytomegalovirus retinitis (inflammation of the retina, characterised by a "pizza pie appearance" on ophthalmoscopy)
- cytomegalovirus colitis (inflammation of the large bowel)
- CMV pneumonitis
- CMV esophagitis
- polyradiculopathy, transverse myelitis, and subacute encephalitis

People without CMV infection who are given organ transplants from CMV-infected donors require prophylactic treatment with valganciclovir (ideally) or ganciclovir, and regular serological monitoring to detect a rising CMV titre; if treated early, establishment of a potentially life-threatening infection can be prevented.

=== Immunocompetent adults ===
CMV infections can still be of clinical significance in adult immunocompetent populations.

- CMV mononucleosis (some sources reserve "mononucleosis" for Epstein–Barr virus only). However, the mononucleosis syndrome associated with CMV typically lacks signs of enlarged cervical lymph nodes and splenomegaly.
- CMV has also been associated with Guillain–Barré syndrome, type 1 diabetes, and type 2 diabetes.

The question of whether latent CMV infection has any negative effects on people who are otherwise healthy has been debated; as of 2016, the answer was not clear, but discussions had focused on whether latent CMV might increase the risk of some cardiovascular diseases and cancers.

== Pathogenesis ==

Most healthy people who are infected with HCMV after birth have no symptoms. Some develop a syndrome similar to infectious mononucleosis or glandular fever, with prolonged fever, and a mild hepatitis. A sore throat is common. After infection, the virus remains latent in lymphocytes in the body for the rest of the person's life. Overt disease rarely occurs unless immunity is suppressed either by drugs, infection or old age. Initial HCMV infection, which often is asymptomatic, is followed by a prolonged, inapparent infection during which the virus resides in mononuclear cells without causing detectable damage or clinical illness.

Infectious CMV may be shed in the bodily fluids of any infected person, and can be found in urine, saliva, blood, tears, semen, and breast milk. The shedding of virus can occur intermittently, without any detectable signs or symptoms.

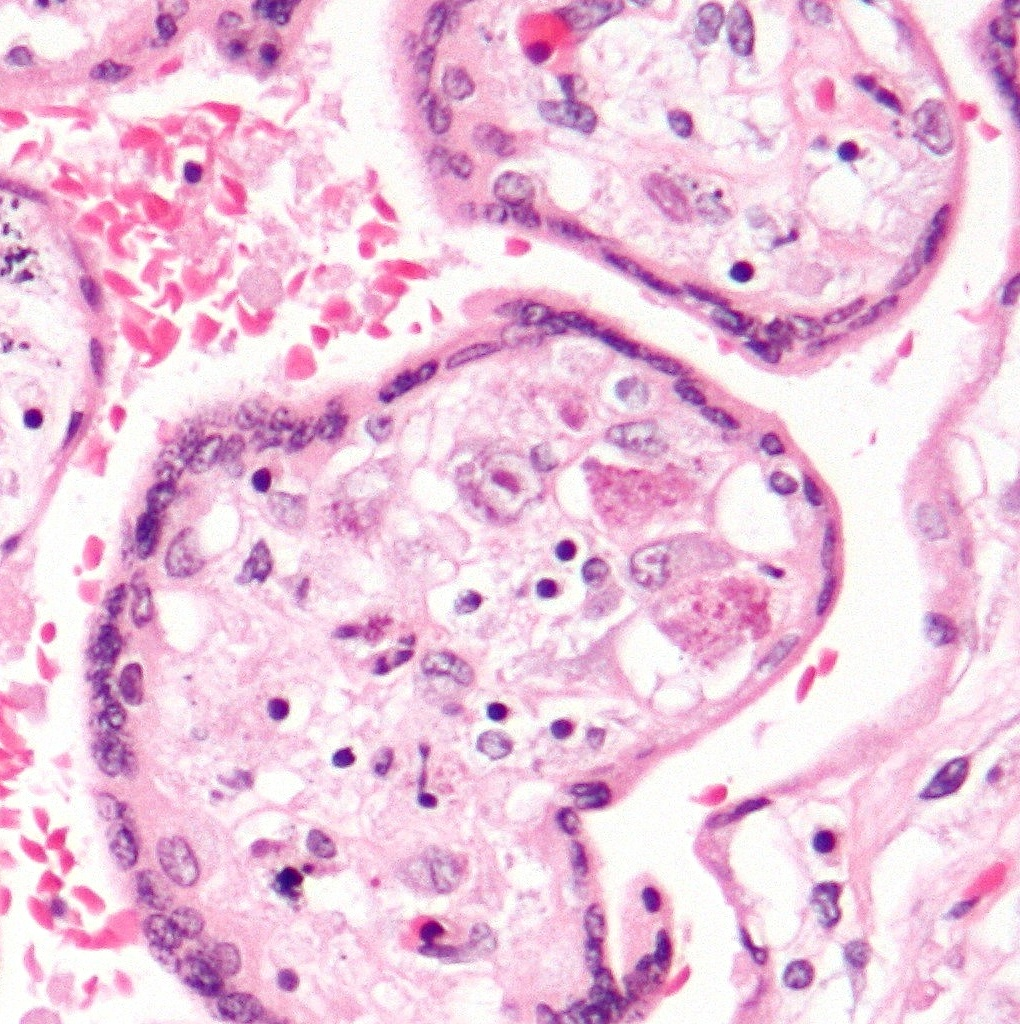
Micrograph of CMV placentitis. One cell in the image (centre) has the characteristic large nucleus with peri-nuclear clearing. Two cells (centre-right) have the characteristic (cytoplasmic) viral inclusion bodies (small pink globules). H&E stain.

CMV infection can be demonstrated microscopically by the detection of intranuclear inclusion bodies. On H&E staining, the inclusion bodies stain dark pink and are called "owl's eye" inclusion bodies.

HCMV infection is important to certain high-risk groups. Major areas of risk of infection include pre-natal or postnatal infants and immunocompromised individuals, such as organ transplant recipients, persons with leukemia, or those infected with human immunodeficiency virus (HIV). In HIV infected persons, HCMV is considered an AIDS-defining infection, indicating that the T-cell count has dropped to low levels.

Lytically replicating viruses disrupt the cytoskeleton, causing massive cell enlargement, which is the source of the virus's name.

A study published in 2009 links infection with CMV to high blood pressure in mice, and suggests that the result of CMV infection of blood vessels' endothelium in humans is a major cause of atherosclerosis. Researchers also found that when the cells were infected with CMV, they created renin, a protein known to contribute to high blood pressure.

Human CMV causes cellular senescence, which could contribute to chronic inflammation (inflammaging). Human CMV is also linked to age-associated T cell dysfunction, contributing to immunosenescence. In persons infected with CMV about 10% of memory T cells are CMV-specific, but these may expand to as much as 30% in the elderly, 50% or more of CD8^{+} memory T-cells. COVID-19 symptom severity is associated with CMV, although the exact mechanism has not been elucidated.

CMV encodes a protein, UL16, which is involved in the immune evasion of NK cell responses. It binds to ligands ULBP1, ULBP2 and MICB of NK cell activating receptor NKG2D, which prevents their surface expression. These ligands are normally upregulated in times of cellular stress, such as in viral infection, and by preventing their upregulation, CMV can prevent its host cell from dying due to NK cells

A substantial portion of the immune system is involved in continuously controlling CMV, which drains the resources of the immune system. Death rates from infectious disease accelerate with age, and CMV infection correlates with reduced effectiveness of vaccination. Persons with the highest levels of CMV antibodies have a much higher risk of death from all causes compared with persons having few or no antibodies.

== Diagnosis ==
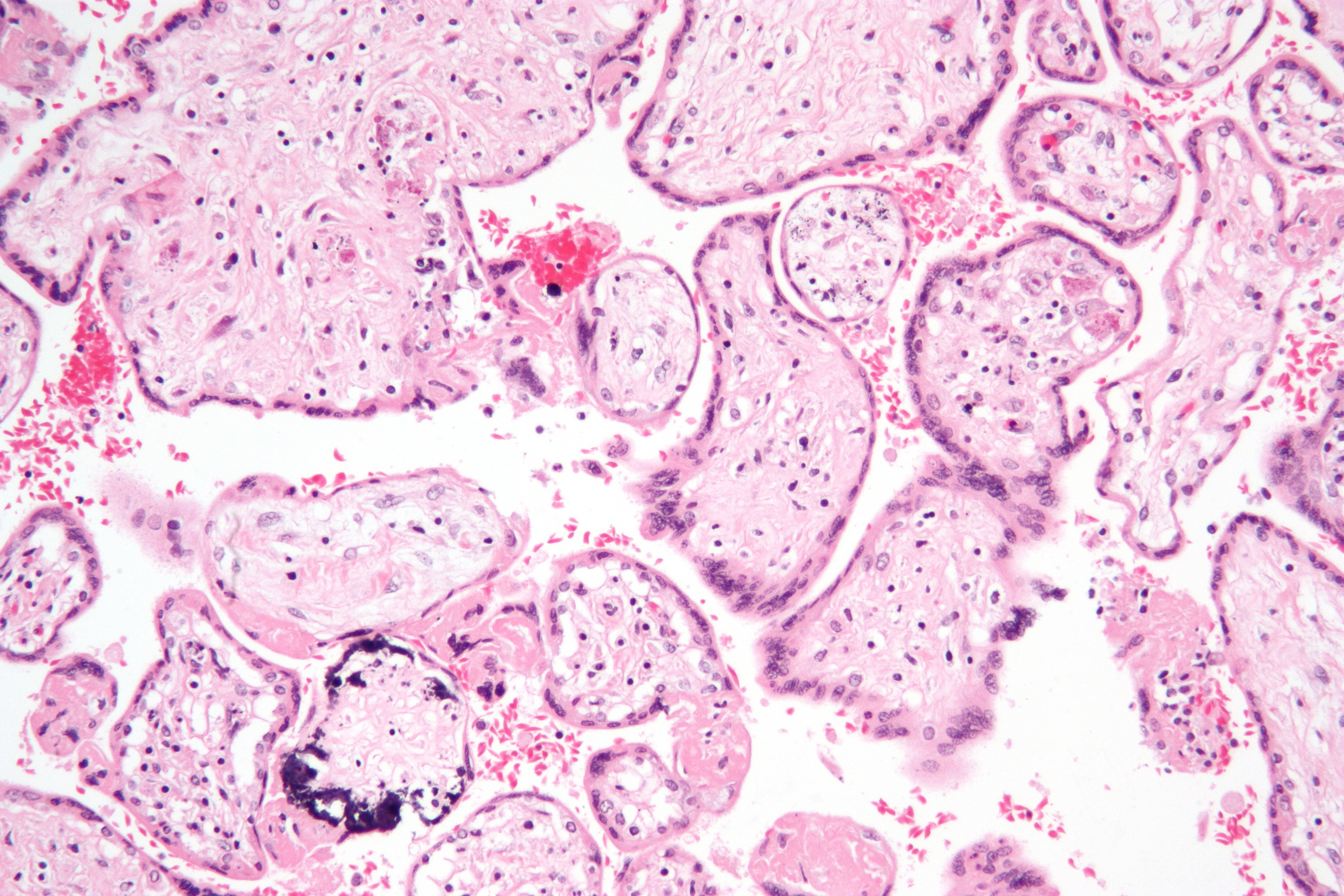
Micrograph of CMV placentitis.

Most infections with CMV go undiagnosed, as the virus usually produces few, if any, symptoms and tends to reactivate intermittently without symptoms. Persons who have been infected with CMV develop antibodies to the virus, which persist in the body for the lifetime of that individual. Several laboratory tests that detect these antibodies to CMV have been developed to determine if infection has occurred and are widely available from commercial laboratories. In addition, the virus can be cultured from specimens obtained from urine, throat swabs, bronchial lavages, and tissue samples to detect active infection. Both qualitative and quantitative polymerase chain reaction (PCR) testing for CMV are available as well, allowing physicians to monitor the viral load of people infected with CMV.

The CMV pp65 antigenemia test is an immunofluorescence-based assay that utilizes an indirect immunofluorescence technique for identifying the pp65 protein of cytomegalovirus in peripheral blood leukocytes. The CMV pp65 assay is widely used for monitoring CMV infection and its response to antiviral treatment in people who are under immunosuppressive therapy and have had renal transplantation surgery, as the antigenemia results are obtained about 5 days before the onset of symptomatic CMV disease. The advantage of this assay is the rapidity in providing results in a few hours, and that the pp65 antigen determination represents a useful criterion for the physician to initiate antiviral therapy. The major disadvantage of the pp65 assay is that only a limited number of samples can be processed per test batch.

CMV should be suspected if a person has symptoms of infectious mononucleosis but has negative test results for mononucleosis and Epstein–Barr virus, or if they show signs of hepatitis, but have negative test results for hepatitis A, B, and C.

For best diagnostic results, laboratory tests for CMV antibody should be performed by using paired serum samples. One blood sample should be taken upon suspicion of CMV, and another one taken within 2 weeks. A virus culture can be performed at any time the person is symptomatic. Laboratory testing for antibodies to CMV can be performed to determine if a woman has already had CMV infection. However, routine testing of all pregnant women is costly, and the need for testing should therefore be evaluated on a case-by-case basis.

=== Serologic testing ===
The enzyme-linked immunosorbent assay (or ELISA) is the most commonly available serologic test for measuring antibody to CMV. The result can be used to determine if acute infection, prior infection, or passively acquired maternal antibody in an infant is present. Other tests include various fluorescence assays, indirect hemagglutination, (PCR) and latex agglutination.

An ELISA technique for CMV-specific IgM is available, but may give false-positive results unless steps are taken to remove rheumatoid factor or most of the IgG antibody before the serum sample is tested. Because CMV-specific IgM may be produced in low levels in reactivated CMV infection, its presence is not always indicative of primary infection. Only virus recovered from a target organ, such as the lung, provides unequivocal evidence that the current illness is caused by acquired CMV infection. If serologic tests detect a positive or high titer of IgG, this result should not automatically be interpreted to mean that active CMV infection is present. Active CMV infection is considered to be present if antibody tests of paired serum samples show a fourfold rise in IgG antibody and a significant level of IgM antibody (equal to at least 30% of the IgG value), or if the virus is cultured from a urine or throat specimen.

=== Relevance to blood donors ===
Although the risks discussed above are generally low, CMV assays are part of the standard screening for non-directed blood donation (donations not specified for a particular person) in the U.S., the UK, and many other countries. CMV-negative donations are then earmarked for transfusion to infants or people who are immunocompromised. Some blood donation centers maintain lists of donors whose blood is CMV negative due to special demands.

=== Relevance to bone marrow donors ===
During allogeneic hematopoietic stem cell transplant (HSCT), it is generally advised to match the serostatus of donor and recipient. If the recipient is seronegative, a seropositive donor carries a risk of de novo infection. Conversely, a seropositive recipient is at risk of viral reactivation if they receive a transplant from a seronegative donor, losing their innate defenses in the process. In general, the risk is highest for CMV seropositive recipients, in which viral reactivation is a cause of significant morbidity. Antivirals, like Letermovir, effectively prevent clinically significant CMV after HSCT, though subclinical reactivation is common, with steroid exposure being the strongest risk factor. For these reasons, CMV serologic testing is routine for both bone marrow donors and recipients.

== Prevention ==
=== Vaccination ===
A phase 2 study of a CMV vaccine published in 2009 indicated an efficacy of 50%—the protection provided was limited, and several subjects contracted CMV infection despite vaccination. In one case, congenital CMV was encountered.

In 2013, Astellas Pharma started a phase 3 trial on individuals who received a hematopoietic stem cell transplant with its CMV deoxyribonucleic acid DNA cytomegalovirus vaccine ASP0113.

In 2015, Astellas Pharma commenced a phase 1 trial with its cytomegalovirus vaccine ASP0113.

Further cytomegalovirus vaccine candidates are the CMV-MVA Triplex vaccine and the CMVpp65-A*0201 peptide vaccine. Both vaccine candidates are sponsored by the City of Hope National Medical Center. As of 2016, the development is in clinical phase 2 trial stage.

=== Hygiene ===
The Centers for Disease Control and Prevention (CDC) recommend regular hand washing, especially after changing diapers. Hand washing is also recommended after feeding a child, wiping a child's nose or mouth, or handling children's toys.

== Treatment ==
Hyperimmune globulin enriched for CMV (CMV-IGIV) is an immunoglobulin G (IgG) containing a standardized number of antibodies to cytomegalovirus. It may be used for the prophylaxis of cytomegalovirus disease associated with transplantation of the kidney, lung, liver, pancreas, and heart. Alone or in combination with an antiviral agent, it has been shown to:

- Reduce the risk of CMV-related disease and death in some of the highest-risk transplant recipients
- Provide a measurable long-term survival benefit
- Produce minimal treatment-related side effects and adverse events.

Ganciclovir (Cytovene) treatment is used for people with depressed immunity who have either sight-related or life-threatening illnesses. Valganciclovir (Valcyte) is an antiviral drug that is also effective and is given orally: it is a pro-drug that gets converted into ganciclovir in the body, but is much better absorbed orally than the latter. Drug-resistant virus isolates often compromise the therapeutic effectiveness of ganciclovir. A variety of amino acid changes in the UL97 protein kinase and the viral DNA polymerase have been reported to cause drug resistance. Foscarnet or cidofovir are only given to people with CMV resistant to ganciclovir, because foscarnet has notable nephrotoxicity, resulting in increased or decreased Ca^{2+} or PO_{4}^{3−}, and decreased Mg^{2+} levels.

Letermovir has been approved by the European Medicines Agency and the FDA for treatment and prophylaxis of HCMV infection with relatively rare de novo resistance.

A better understanding of how HCMV supports viral latency and reactivation should allow for the development of new therapies that target the latent reservoir.

=== Drug resistance ===
Antiviral mechanisms of HCMV drugs.

All three currently licensed anti-HCMV drugs target the viral DNA polymerase, pUL54. Ganciclovir (GCV) acts as a nucleoside analogue. Its antiviral activity requires phosphorylation by the HCMV protein kinase, pUL97. The second drug, Cidofovir (CDV), is a nucleotide analogue, which is already phosphorylated and thus active. Finally, Foscarnet (FOS) has a different mode of action. It directly inhibits polymerase function by blocking the pyrophosphate binding site of pUL54 (note: investigational drug letermovir acts through a mechanism that involves viral terminase). Two HCMV proteins are implicated in antiviral resistance against these three drugs: pUL97 and pUL54. Specific mutations in pUL97 can cause reduced phosphorylation activity of this viral protein kinase. Thus, fewer monophosphorylated – and thus active – GCV can be synthesized, leading to antiviral resistance against GCV. About 90% of cases of GCV resistance are caused by such mutations in UL97. Mutations in pUL54 may have different effects leading to antiviral drug resistance: A. They can lead to decreased affinity to antiviral compounds. This resistance mechanism concerns GCV, CDV, and FOS and may lead to multidrug resistance. B. Some mutations in pUL54 can increase the polymerase's exonuclease activity. This causes enhanced recognition of incorporated GCV and CDV. As a result, these dNTP analogues are excised more efficiently. Major risk factors for HCMV drug resistance are the residual capacity of the host's immune system to control viral replication and the overall amount and duration of viral replication. HCMV antiviral drug resistance can be detected by phenotypic or genotypic drug resistance testing. Phenotypic resistance testing involves cultivation of the virus in cell culture and testing its susceptibility using different antiviral drug concentrations to determine EC50 values. In contrast, genotypic resistance testing means the detection of resistance-associated mutations in UL97 and UL54 by sequencing. Genotypic resistance testing is becoming the method of choice because it is faster, but requires previous phenotypic characterisation of each newly found mutation. This can be performed via a web-based search tool that links a person's HCMV sequence to a database containing all published UL97 and UL54 mutations and corresponding antiviral drug susceptibility phenotypes.

== Epidemiology ==
In the United States, CMV infection rises with age from about 60% of people infected by 6 years of age, leveling off at about 85–90% of the population by ages 75–80.
