= Killer activation receptor =

Class of protein

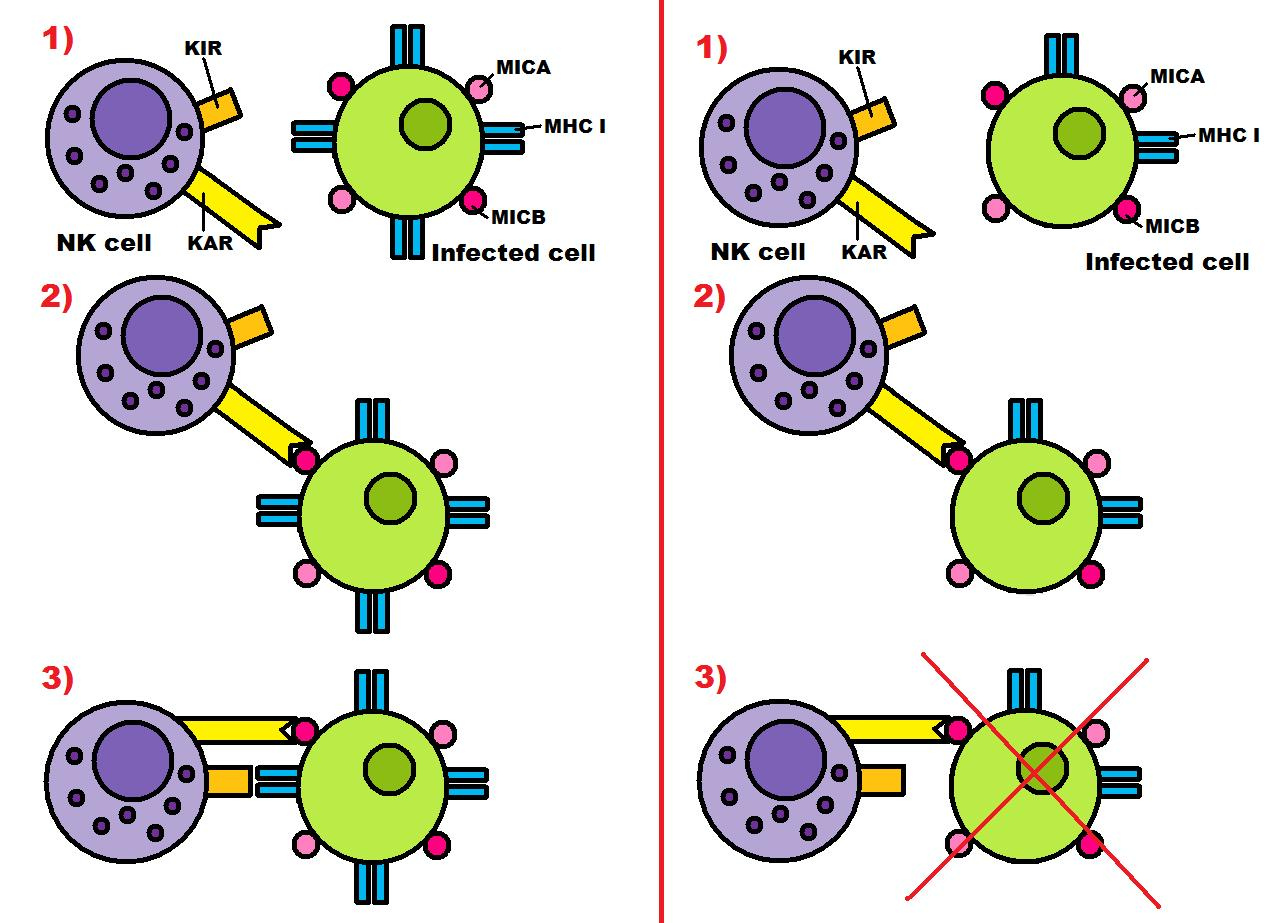
When a KAR binds to MICA and MICB molecules on the surface of an infected cell (or a tumor cell), a KIR examines the levels of MHC class I of this target cell. If the MHC class I levels are enough, killing of the cell doesn't proceed (left), but if they aren't, the killing signal proceeds and the cell is eliminated (right).

Killer Activation Receptors (KARs) are activating receptors expressed on the plasma membrane (cell membrane) of Natural Killer cells (NK cells). These KARs are essential in order for NK cells to regulate and induce human immune responses through activating signals. Our immune system works with our NK cells to target pathogens and invaders like bacteria, cancer cells, and infectious cells. Killer Inhibitory Receptors (abbreviated as KIRs in this text) are responsible for sending the inhibitory signals to NK cells. These KIRs counterbalance activating signals from KARs by sending competitive inhibitory signals. This occurs so that there is regulation of the NK cells functions on host cells or transformed cells. These receptors have a broad binding specificity that are able to send different signals. It is the balance between these competing signals that determines if the cytotoxic activity of the NK cell and apoptosis of the distressed cell occurs. Natural Cytotoxicity Receptors (NCRs) and NKG2D are the two important KARs that are expressed on NK cells that recognize stress-induced ligands and aid in marking them for destruction.

== Killer Inhibitory Receptor vs. Killer-cell Immunglobulin-like Receptors ==
There may be slight confusion regarding the KIR acronym. The KIR term has been used parallelly both for the Killer-cell immunoglobulin-like receptors (KIRs) and for the Killer Inhibitory Receptors (also known as KIRs). The Killer-cell immunoglobulin-like receptors are a gene family involving glycoproteins that are expressed on the plasma membrane (cell membrane) of NK cells. This involves both activation and inhibitory receptors. The abbreviation KIRs used as Killer-cell inhibitory receptors on the other hand is used more as a functional term that involve both immunoglobulin-like receptors and C-type lectin-like receptors in correlation to NK cell apoptosis and regulation.

== Killer Activation Receptors vs. Killer Inhibitory Receptors ==
KARs and KIRs have some morphological features in common, such as being transmembrane proteins. The similarities are specially found in the extracellular domains.

The differences between KARs and KIRs tend to be in the intracellular domains. They can have a tyrosine containing activation or inhibitory motifs in the intracellular part of the receptor molecule (they are called ITAMs and ITIMs).

At first, it was thought that there was only one KAR and one KIR receptor present on the NK cell, known as the two-receptor model. In the last decade, many different KARs and KIRs, such as NKp46 or NKG2D, have been discovered creating the opposing-signals model. NKG2D is activated by the cell-surface ligands MICA and ULBP2.

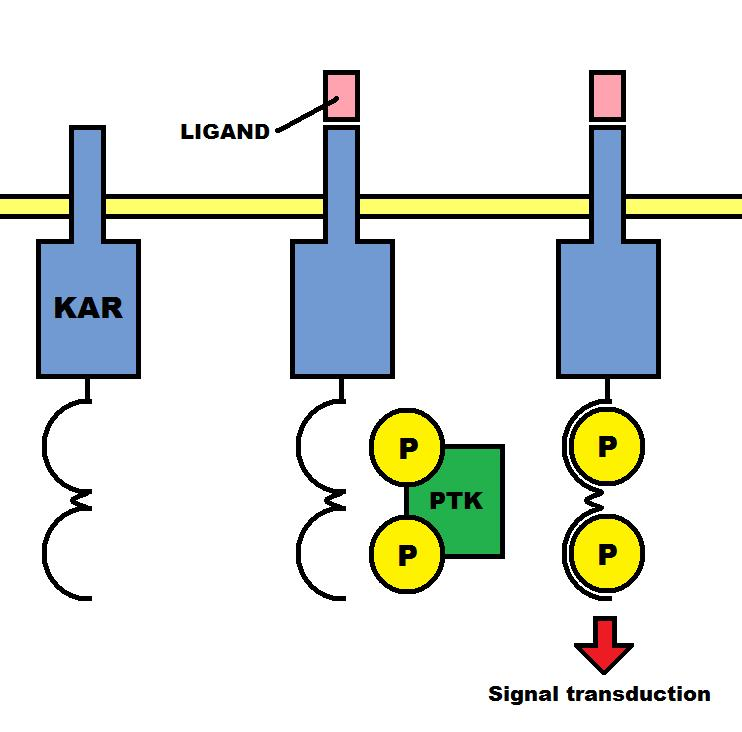
When the ligand binds to the KAR, ITAMs in cytoplasmic tail of the receptor are phosphorylated by the kinase PTK and the transduction signal takes place. The accessory signaling molecule CD3ζ and the adaptor protein DAP10 or DAP12 have been simplified for a better comprehension.

Even though KARs and KIRs are receptors with antagonistic effects on NK cells, they have some structural characteristics in common. Both receptors are usually transmembrane proteins. Additionally, the extracellular domains of these proteins tend to have similar molecular features and are responsible for ligand recognition.

The opposing functions of these receptors are due to differences in their intracellular domains. KARs proteins possess positively charged transmembrane residues and short cytoplasmic tails that contain few intracellular signaling domains. In contrast, KIRs proteins usually have long cytoplasmic tails.

As the chains from KARs are not able to mediate any signal transduction in isolation, a common feature of such receptors is the presence of noncovalently linked subunits that contain immunoreceptor tyrosine-based activation motifs (ITAMs) in their cytoplasmic tails. ITAMs are composed of a conserved sequence of amino acids, including two Tyr-x-x-Leu/Ile elements (where x is any amino acid) separated by six to eight amino acid residues. When the binding of an activation ligand to an activation receptor complex occurs, the tyrosine residues in the ITAMs in the associated chain are phosphorylated by kinases, and a signal that promotes natural cytotoxicity is conveyed to the interior of the NK cell. Therefore, ITAMs are involved in the facilitation of signal transduction. These subunits are moreover composed of an accessory signaling molecule such as CD3ζ, the γc chain, or one of two adaptor proteins called DAP10 and DAP12. All of these molecules possess negatively charged transmembrane domains.

A common feature of members of all KIR is the presence of immunoreceptor tyrosine-based inhibition motifs (ITIMs) in their cytoplasmic tails. ITIMs are composed of the sequence Ile/Val/Leu/Ser-x-Tyr-x-x-Leu/Val, where x denotes any amino acid. The latter are essential to the signaling functions of these molecules. When an inhibitory receptor is stimulated by the binding of MHC class I, kinases and phosphatases are recruited to the receptor complex. This is how ITIMs counteract the effect of kinases initiated by activating receptors and manage to inhibit the signal transduction within the NK cell.

== Types of Killer Activation Receptors ==
Based on their structure there are three different groups of KARS. The first group of receptors is called Natural Cytotoxicity Receptors (NCR), which only includes activation receptors. The two other classes are: Natural Killer Group 2 (NKG2), which includes activation and inhibition receptors, and some KIRs which do not have an inhibitor role.

The three receptors that are included in the NCR class are NKp46, NKp44 and NKp30. The crystal structure of NKp46, which is representative for all three NCR, has been determined. It has two C2-set immunoglobulin domains, and it's probable that the binding site for its ligand is near the interdomain hinge.

There are two NKG2-class receptors which are NKG2D and CD94/NKG2C. NKG2D, which doesn't bind to CD94, is a homodimeric lectin-like receptor. CD94/NKG2C consists in a complex formed by the CD94 protein, which is a C-type lectin molecule bound to the NKG2C protein. This molecule can bind to five classes of NKG2 (A, B, C, E and H), but the union can trigger an activation or an inhibition response, depending on the NKG2 molecule (CD94/NKG2A, for example, is an inhibitor complex).

Most KIRs have an inhibitor function, however, a few KIRs that have an activator role also exist. One of these activating KIRs is KIR2DS1, which has an Ig-like structure, like KIRs in general.

Finally, there is CD16, a low affinity Fc receptor (FcγRIII) which contains N-glycosylation sites; therefore, it is a glycoprotein.

Killer Activation Receptors are associated with signaling intracellular chains. In fact, these intracellular domains determine the opposite functions of activation and inhibitory receptors. Activation receptors are associated with an accessory signaling molecule (for instance, CD3ζ) or with an adaptor protein, which can be either DAP10 or DAP12. All of these signaling molecules contain immunoreceptor tyrosine-based activated motifs (ITAMs), which are phosphorylated and consequently facilitate signal transduction.

Each of these receptors has a specific ligand, although some receptors that belong to the same class, such as NCR, recognize similar molecules.

== How do they work? ==
KARs can detect a specific type of molecules: MICA and MICB. These molecules are in MHC class I of human cells and they are related to cellular stress: this is why MICA and MICB appear in infected or transformed cells but they aren't very common in healthy cells. KARs recognize MICA and MICB when they are in a huge proportion and get engaged. This engagement activates the natural killer cell to attack the transformed or infected cells. This action can be done in different ways. NK can kill directly the hosted cell, it can do it by segregating cytokines, IFN-β and IFN-α, or by doing both things.

There are other less common ligands, like carbohydrate domains, which are recognized by a group of receptors: C-type lectins (so named because they have calcium-dependent carbohydrates recognition domains).

In addition to lectins, there are other molecules implicated in the activation of NK. These additional proteins are: CD2 and CD16. The CD16 works in antibody-mediated recognition.

Finally, there is a group of proteins which are related to the activation in an unknown way. These are NKp30, Nkp44 and Nkp46.

These ligands activate the NK cell, however, before the activation, Killer Inhibition Receptors (KIRs) recognize certain molecules in the MHC class I of the hosted cell and get engaged with them. These molecules are typical of healthy cells but some of these molecules are repressed in infected or transformed cells. For this reason when the hosted cell is really infected the proportion of KARs engaged with ligands is bigger than the proportion of KIRs engaged with MHC I molecules. When this happens the NK is activated and the hosted cell is destroyed. On the other hand, if there are more KIRs engaged with MHC class I molecules than KARs engaged with ligands, the NK isn't activated and the suspicious hosted cell remains alive.

== KARs in Viral Infections ==
One of the ways NK cells are able to distinguish between normal and infected or transformed cells by monitoring the amount of MHC class I molecules the cells have on their surface. When it comes to an infected cell or tumor cell, the expression of MHC class I decreases. However, some viruses are able to evade detection through the reduction of expressed stress-reduced ligands. They can also evade by interfering with the activating receptor pathways that are on the surface and within NK cells. This causes the recognition of these viruses by immune cells to decrease. Now, KARs become vital. These evaded cells become more susceptible to targeting and attack by NK cells by the use of KARs through recognition of stress-induced ligands.

NKG2D which is a KAR, is responsible for triggering intracellular signals through DAP10, and adaptor molecule. It does this through binding to ligands like MICA, MICB, and ULBP proteins which are commonly unregulated in cells that are infected. This activates MAPK and PI3K/AKT pathways, that leads to the cytotoxicity of NK cells.

== KARs in Cancer Immunity ==
In cancers, a Killer Activation Receptor (KAR), located on the surface of the NK cell, binds to certain molecules which only appear on cells that are undergoing stress situations. In humans, this KAR is called NKG2D and it recognizes the molecules MICA and MICB. These are two proteins that are also considered 'stress-induced ligands'. This binding provides a signal which induces the NK cell to kill the target cell.

Then, Killer Inhibitory Receptors (KIRs) examine the surface of the tumor cell in order to determine the levels of MHC class I molecules it has. If KIRs bind sufficiently to MHC class I molecules, the "killing signal" is overridden to prevent the killing of the cell. However, if KIRs are not sufficiently engaged to MHC class I molecules, killing of the target cell proceeds.
