= RAET1L =

Identifiers
- Aliases: RAET1L, ULBP6, retinoic acid early transcript 1L, RAET1H
- External IDs: OMIM: 611047; GeneCards: RAET1L
Available structures
PDB	Human UniProt search: PDBe RCSB
PDB	List of PDB id codes 4S0U

Gene location (Human)
Chr.	Chromosome 6 (human)
Band	6q25.1	Start	150,018,334 bp
Band	6q25.1	End	150,025,532 bp
RNA expression pattern
Bgee	Human / Mouse (ortholog); Top expressed in: vagina; skin of leg; skin of abdomen; minor salivary glands; olfactory zone of nasal mucosa; islet of Langerhans; tonsil; ectocervix; stromal cell of endometrium; smooth muscle tissue / n/a; More reference expression data
BioGPS	n/a
Gene ontology
Molecular function	natural killer cell lectin-like receptor binding; protein binding
Cellular component	anchored component of membrane; membrane; extracellular region; plasma membrane; endoplasmic reticulum; extracellular space; external side of plasma membrane
Biological process	natural killer cell mediated cytotoxicity; immune system process; viral process; T cell mediated cytotoxicity; immune response; natural killer cell activation; susceptibility to natural killer cell mediated cytotoxicity
Sources:Amigo / QuickGO
Orthologs
Databases	NCBI: entry; OMA: entry
Species	Human	Mouse
Entrez	154064	n/a
Ensembl	ENSG00000155918	n/a
UniProt	Q5VY80	n/a
RefSeq (mRNA)	NM_130900	n/a
RefSeq (protein)	NP_570970	n/a
Location (UCSC)	Chr 6: 150.02 – 150.03 Mb	n/a
PubMed search		n/a
- Wikidata
View/Edit Human

Retinoic acid early transcript 1L (RAET1L) is a cell surface glycoprotein encoded by RAET1L gene located on the chromosome 6. RAET1L is related to MHC class I molecules, but its gene maps outside the MHC locus. RAET1L is composed of the α1α2 domain and is linked to the cell membrane by the GPI anchor. It functions as a stress-induced ligand for NKG2D receptor. Its expression is, for example, triggered in course of HCMV infection, but HCMV alters its function. HCMV-encoded UL16 glycoprotein retains ULBP6 inside the cells, preventing it from reaching the cell surface and being exposed to cells of the immune system.
