= Rae-1 family =

Protein family

Retinoic acid early inducible 1 (RAE-1) family of murine cell surface glycoproteins is composed of at least five members (RAE-1α-ε). Genes encoding these proteins are located on mouse chromosome 10. RAE-1 proteins are related to MHC class I, they are made up of external α1α2 domain which is linked to the cell membrane by the GPI anchor. They function as stress-induced ligands for NKG2D receptor and their expression is low or absent on normal cells. However, they are constitutively expressed on some tumour cells and they can be upregulated by retinoic acid.
