= ULBP3 =

Protein-coding gene in the species Homo sapiens

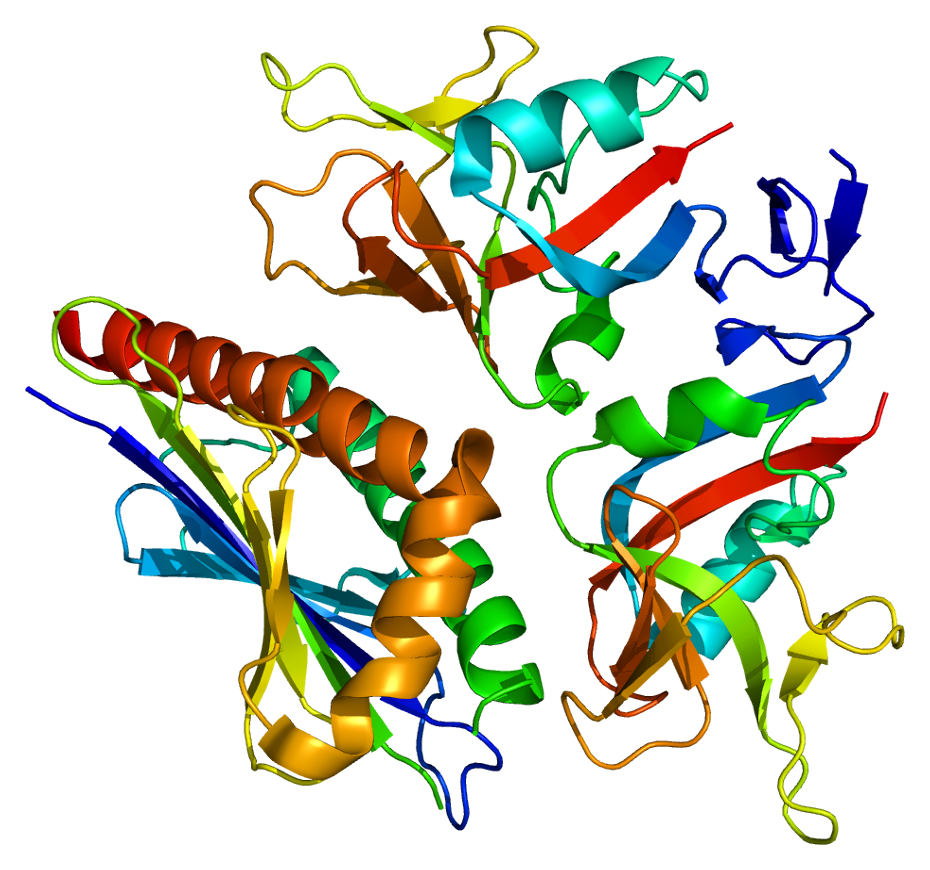

Identifiers
- Aliases: ULBP3, RAET1N, N2DL-3, NKG2DL3, UL16 binding protein 3
- External IDs: OMIM: 605699; GeneCards: ULBP3
Available structures
PDB	Human UniProt search: PDBe RCSB
PDB	List of PDB id codes 1KCG

Gene location (Human)
Chr.	Chromosome 6 (human)
Band	6q25.1	Start	150,061,053 bp
Band	6q25.1	End	150,069,121 bp
RNA expression pattern
Bgee	Human / Mouse (ortholog); Top expressed in: testicle; pancreatic epithelial cell; cartilage tissue; stromal cell of endometrium; gingival epithelium; tibia; gonad; ventricular zone; islet of Langerhans; retinal pigment epithelium / n/a; More reference expression data
BioGPS	n/a
Gene ontology
Molecular function	natural killer cell lectin-like receptor binding; protein binding
Cellular component	anchored component of membrane; anchored component of plasma membrane; plasma membrane; membrane; extracellular space; external side of plasma membrane
Biological process	natural killer cell activation; viral process; natural killer cell mediated cytotoxicity; regulation of immune response; immune system process; T cell mediated cytotoxicity; immune response; susceptibility to natural killer cell mediated cytotoxicity
Sources:Amigo / QuickGO
Orthologs
Databases	NCBI: entry; OMA: entry
Species	Human	Mouse
Entrez	79465	n/a
Ensembl	ENSG00000131019	n/a
UniProt	Q9BZM4	n/a
RefSeq (mRNA)	NM_024518	n/a
RefSeq (protein)	NP_078794	n/a
Location (UCSC)	Chr 6: 150.06 – 150.07 Mb	n/a
PubMed search		n/a
- Wikidata
View/Edit Human

UL16 binding protein 3 (ULBP3) is a cell surface glycoprotein encoded by ULBP3 gene located on the chromosome 6. ULBP3 is related to MHC class I molecules, but its gene maps outside the MHC locus. The domain structure of ULBP3 differs significantly from those of conventional MHC class I molecules. It does not contain the α3 domain and the transmembrane segment. ULBP3 is thus composed of only the α1α2 domain which is linked to the cell membrane by the GPI anchor. It functions as a stress-induced ligand for NKG2D receptor.
