= RAET1G =

Identifiers
- Aliases: RAET1G, ULBP5, retinoic acid early transcript 1G
- External IDs: OMIM: 609244; GeneCards: RAET1G

Gene location (Human)
Chr.	Chromosome 6 (human)
Band	6q25.1	Start	149,916,878 bp
Band	6q25.1	End	149,923,121 bp
RNA expression pattern
Bgee	Human / Mouse (ortholog); Top expressed in: mucosa of esophagus; left adrenal gland; right adrenal gland; left adrenal cortex; right adrenal cortex; vagina; stromal cell of endometrium; olfactory zone of nasal mucosa; ectocervix; skin of abdomen / n/a; More reference expression data
BioGPS	n/a
Gene ontology
Molecular function	natural killer cell lectin-like receptor binding; protein binding
Cellular component	integral component of membrane; anchored component of membrane; endoplasmic reticulum; membrane; extracellular region; plasma membrane; extracellular space; external side of plasma membrane
Biological process	natural killer cell mediated cytotoxicity; immune system process; viral process; positive regulation of natural killer cell cytokine production; T cell mediated cytotoxicity; immune response; natural killer cell activation; susceptibility to natural killer cell mediated cytotoxicity
Sources:Amigo / QuickGO
Orthologs
Databases	NCBI: entry; OMA: entry
Species	Human	Mouse
Entrez	353091	n/a
Ensembl	ENSG00000203722	n/a
UniProt	Q6H3X3	n/a
RefSeq (mRNA)	NM_001001788	n/a
RefSeq (protein)	NP_001001788	n/a
Location (UCSC)	Chr 6: 149.92 – 149.92 Mb	n/a
PubMed search		n/a
- Wikidata
View/Edit Human

Retinoic acid early transcript 1G (RAET1G) is a cell surface glycoprotein encoded by RAET1G gene located on chromosome 6. RAET1G is related to MHC class I molecules, but its gene maps outside the MHC locus. RAET1G is composed of an external α1α2 domain, a transmembrane segment, and C-terminal cytoplasmic tail. RAET1E functions as a stress-induced ligand for NKG2D receptors.
