= RAET1E =

Protein-coding gene in the species Homo sapiens

Identifiers
- Aliases: RAET1E, LETAL, N2DL-4, NKG2DL4, RAET1E2, RL-4, ULBP4, bA350J20.7, retinoic acid early transcript 1E
- External IDs: OMIM: 609243; GeneCards: RAET1E

Gene location (Human)
| Chr. | Chromosome 6 (human) |
| Band | 6q25.1 | Start | 149,883,179 bp |
| Band | 6q25.1 | End | 149,898,113 bp |
RNA expression pattern
| Bgee | Human / Mouse (ortholog); Top expressed in: mucosa of esophagus; zone of skin; skin of abdomen; skin of leg; vagina; testicle; olfactory zone of nasal mucosa; Achilles tendon; tonsil; gonad / n/a; More reference expression data |
| BioGPS | n/a |
Gene ontology
| Molecular function | natural killer cell lectin-like receptor binding; protein binding |
| Cellular component | integral component of membrane; extracellular region; plasma membrane; membrane; extracellular space; external side of plasma membrane |
| Biological process | T cell mediated cytotoxicity; natural killer cell mediated cytotoxicity; regulation of immune response; immune system process; positive regulation of natural killer cell mediated cytotoxicity; immune response; natural killer cell activation; susceptibility to natural killer cell mediated cytotoxicity |
Sources:Amigo / QuickGO
Orthologs
| Databases | NCBI: entry; OMA: entry |
| Species | Human | Mouse |
| Entrez | 135250 | n/a |
| Ensembl | ENSG00000164520 | n/a |
| UniProt | Q8TD07 | n/a |
| RefSeq (mRNA) | NM_001243325; NM_001243327; NM_001243328; NM_139165; NM_001394056 NM_001394057 | n/a |
| RefSeq (protein) | NP_001230254; NP_001230256; NP_001230257; NP_631904 | n/a |
| Location (UCSC) | Chr 6: 149.88 – 149.9 Mb | n/a |
| PubMed search | | n/a |
- Wikidata
| View/Edit Human |

Retinoic acid early transcript 1E (RAET1E) is a cell surface glycoprotein encoded by RAET1E gene located on the chromosome 6. RAET1E is related to MHC class I molecules, but its gene maps outside the MHC locus. RAET1E is composed of external α1α2 domain, transmembrane segment and C-terminal cytoplasmic tail. RAET1E functions as a stress-induced ligand for NKG2D receptor.
