= H60 family =

The histocompatibility 60 (H60) was originally identified as a transplant rejection antigen and it is a family of murine cell surface glycoproteins contains three members: H60a, H60b, H60c. The genes encoding these proteins are located on murine chromosome 10. H60 family members are related to MHC class I. H60a and H60b consist of external α1α2 domain, a transmembrane segment, and a cytoplasmic domain. H60c is made up of α1α2 domain which is linked to the cell membrane by GPI anchor. All these proteins function as stress-induced ligands for NKG2D receptor.
