= AIRIM =

Protein-coding gene in humans

Identifiers
- Aliases: AIRIM, C1orf109, AFG2-Interacting Ribosome Maturation Factor, Ribosome Biogenesis Protein C1orf109, FLJ20508, Chromosome 1 Open Reading Frame 109, Uncharacterized Protein C1orf109
- External IDs: OMIM: 614799; MGI: 3041172; GeneCards: AIRIM

Gene location (Mouse)
Chr.	Chromosome 4 (mouse)
Band	4|4 D2.2	Start	124,830,841 bp
Band	4|4 D2.2	End	124,838,449 bp
Orthologs
Databases	NCBI: entry; OMA: entry
Species	Human	Mouse
Entrez	54955	194268
Ensembl	ENSG00000116922	ENSMUSG00000044730
UniProt	Q9NX04	Q499E6
RefSeq (mRNA)	NM_001303030; NM_001303031; NM_017850	NM_177573; NM_001355603; NM_001355605
RefSeq (protein)	NP_001289959; NP_001289960; NP_060320; NP_001337684; NP_001337685 NP_001337686; NP_001337687; NP_001337688; NP_001337689; NP_001337690; NP_001337691; NP_001337692; NP_001337693; NP_001337694; NP_001337695; NP_001337696; NP_001337697; NP_001337698; NP_001337699; NP_001337700	NP_808241; NP_001342532; NP_001342534
Location (UCSC)	n/a	Chr 4: 124.83 – 124.84 Mb
PubMed search
- Wikidata
View/Edit Human	View/Edit Mouse

AFG2-interacting ribosome maturation factor is a protein in humans that is encoded by the gene AIRIM (previously C1orf109).

== Clinical significance ==
This gene may play a role in cancer cell proliferation.
