= HCST =

HCST may refer to:

- HCST (gene)
- Hudson County Schools of Technology, a public school district in Hudson County, New Jersey
