= MHC class I polypeptide–related sequence A =

Protein-coding gene in the species Homo sapiens

MICA

Identifiers
- Aliases: MICA, MIC-A, PERB11.1, MHC class I polypeptide-related sequence A, MHC class I chain–related protein A, MHC class I polypeptide–related protein A
- External IDs: OMIM: 600169; MGI: 2179989; GeneCards: MICA
Available structures
PDB	Ortholog search: PDBe RCSB
PDB	List of PDB id codes 1B3J, 1HYR

Gene location (Human)
Chr.	Chromosome 6 (human)
Band	6p21.33	Start	31,399,784 bp
Band	6p21.33	End	31,415,315 bp

Gene location (Mouse)
Chr.	Chromosome 7 (mouse)
Band	7 A3|7 9.35 cM	Start	18,573,891 bp
Band	7 A3|7 9.35 cM	End	18,599,327 bp
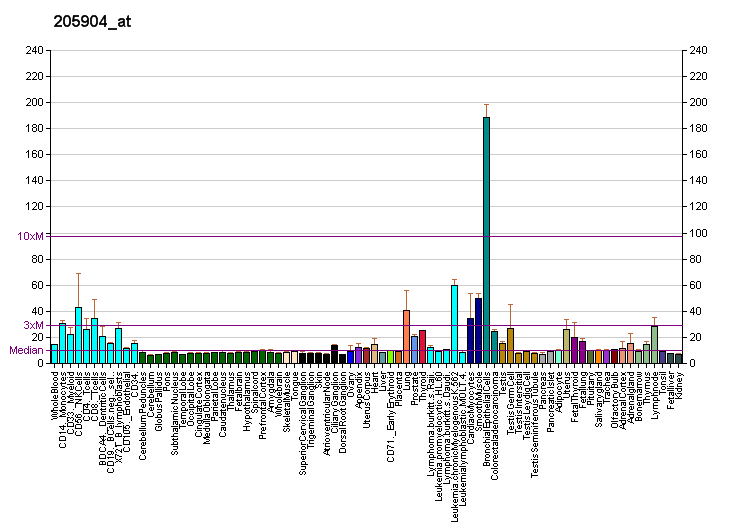

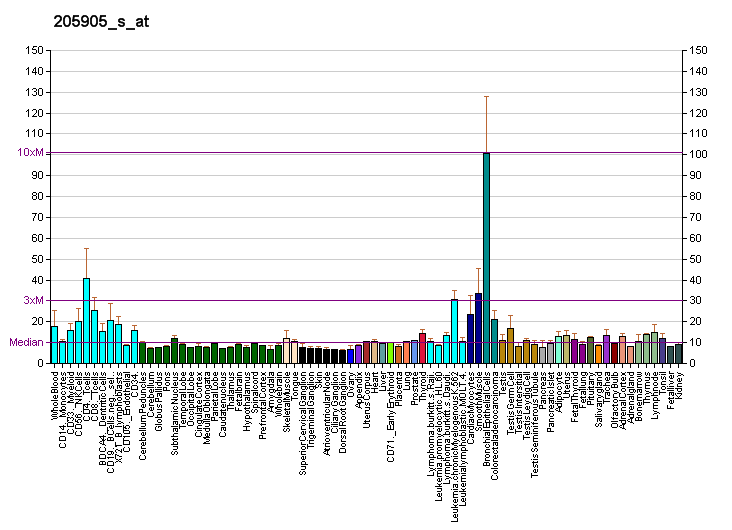
RNA expression pattern
Bgee	Human / Mouse (ortholog); Top expressed in: Descending thoracic aorta; left ovary; popliteal artery; tibial arteries; body of uterus; ascending aorta; right uterine tube; stromal cell of endometrium; left coronary artery; right ovary / Top expressed in: urinary bladder; uterus; lung; ovary; white adipose tissue; adrenal gland; zone of skin; esophagus; muscle tissue; skeletal muscle tissue; More reference expression data
BioGPS	More reference expression data
Gene ontology
Molecular function	beta-2-microglobulin binding; protein binding; natural killer cell lectin-like receptor binding
Cellular component	cytoplasm; integral component of membrane; membrane; plasma membrane; integral component of plasma membrane; cell surface; extracellular space; external side of plasma membrane
Biological process	cytolysis; adaptive immune response; negative regulation of natural killer cell activation; immune system process; gamma-delta T cell activation; response to heat; immune response to tumor cell; cellular response to DNA damage stimulus; defense response to bacterium; defense response to virus; regulation of immune response; negative regulation of natural killer cell mediated cytotoxicity; viral process; T cell mediated cytotoxicity; natural killer cell mediated cytotoxicity; immune response; natural killer cell activation; susceptibility to natural killer cell mediated cytotoxicity
Sources:Amigo / QuickGO
Orthologs
Databases	NCBI: entry; OMA: entry
Species	Human	Mouse
Entrez	100507436	243864
Ensembl	ENSG00000231225; ENSG00000235233; ENSG00000204520; ENSG00000183214; ENSG00000233051 n/a	ENSMUSG00000040987
UniProt	Q29983	Q8HWE5
RefSeq (mRNA)	NM_001289154; NM_000247; NM_001177519; NM_001289152; NM_001289153	NM_153760; NM_153761
RefSeq (protein)	NP_000238; NP_001170990; NP_001276081; NP_001276082; NP_001276083	NP_715641; NP_715642
Location (UCSC)	Chr 6: 31.4 – 31.42 Mb	Chr 7: 18.57 – 18.6 Mb
PubMed search
- Wikidata
View/Edit Human	View/Edit Mouse

MHC class I polypeptide–related sequence A (MICA) is a highly polymorphic cell surface glycoprotein encoded by the MICA gene located within the MHC locus. MICA is related to MHC class I and it has similar domain structure, however, it is not associated with β2-microglobulin nor binds peptides as conventional MHC class I molecules do. MICA rather functions as a stress-induced ligand (as a danger signal) for integral membrane protein receptor NKG2D ("natural-killer group 2, member D"). MICA is broadly recognized by NK cells, γδ T cells, and CD8^{+} αβ T cells which carry NKG2D receptor on their cell surface and which are activated via this interaction.

== Structure ==
The MICA gene is highly polymorphic in humans with more than 50 defined alleles. It is located on chromosome 6 and the protein is expressed in two isoforms formed by alternative splicing: MICA1 and MICA2 which is lacking exon 3. MICA contains external α1α2α3 domain, transmembrane segment and C-terminal cytoplasmic tail. It binds in a form of monomer to a KLRK1/NKG2D homodimer.

There are no orthologs of the MICA in mice species.

== Expression ==
Expression of MICA can be upregulated by heat shock or by exposure of the cells to DNA damaging conditions (for example ionizing radiation, chromatin-modifying interventions and inhibitors of DNA replication). The expression can be as well affected by some infectious agents such as human cytomegalovirus (HCMV), human adenovirus 5, M. tuberculosis, diarrheagenic E.coli, or human papillomavirus (HPV).

microRNA-183 downregulates MICA expression after exposure to transforming growth factor beta (TGFβ).

In normal tissue, MICA is expressed mainly intracellularly with just a small fraction appearing on the surface of some epithelial cells. There is no expression of MICA in the cells of the central nervous system (CNS).

== Function ==
MICA plays the role of stress-induced self-antigen and serves as a ligand for the KLRK1/NKG2D killer activation receptor. Engagement of NKG2D-MICA results in activation of effector cytolytic responses of T cells and NK cells against epithelial tumor cells (or other stressed cells) expressing MICA on their surface.

As a defense mechanism, tumor cells are able to avoid recognition of MICA by the immune system through proteolytic shedding of the surface expressed protein by the cooperation of disulfide isomerase (ERp5) and ADAM (a disintegrin and metalloproteinase) and MMP (matrix metalloproteinase) proteases targeting membrane-proximal α3 domain. High levels of MICA in the serum of tumor patients are positively related to tumor size and poor prognosis.

Variations in the MICA gene are also associated with susceptibility to psoriasis 1 and psoriatic arthritis and MICA-specific antibodies or its shedding are involved in the monoclonal gammopathy of undetermined significance´s (MGUS) progression to multiple myeloma.

== See also ==
- MHC class I
- Major histocompatibility complex
- MHC class I polypeptide-related sequence B
