= Murine UL16 binding protein-like transcript =

Murine UL16 binding protein-like transcript (MULT-1) is a murine cell surface glycoprotein encoded by MULT-1 gene located on murine chromosome 10. MULT-1 is related to MHC class I and is composed of α1α2 domain, a transmembrane segment, and a large cytoplasmic domain. MULT-1 functions as a stress-induced ligand for NKG2D receptor.
