= Cancer cell =

Tumor cell

Cancer cells are cells that divide continually, forming solid tumors or flooding the blood or lymph with abnormal cells. Cell division is a normal process used by the body for growth and repair. A parent cell divides to form two daughter cells, and these daughter cells are used to build new tissue or to replace cells that have died because of aging or damage. Healthy cells stop dividing when there is no longer a need for more daughter cells, but cancer cells continue to produce copies. They are also able to spread from one part of the body to another in a process known as metastasis.

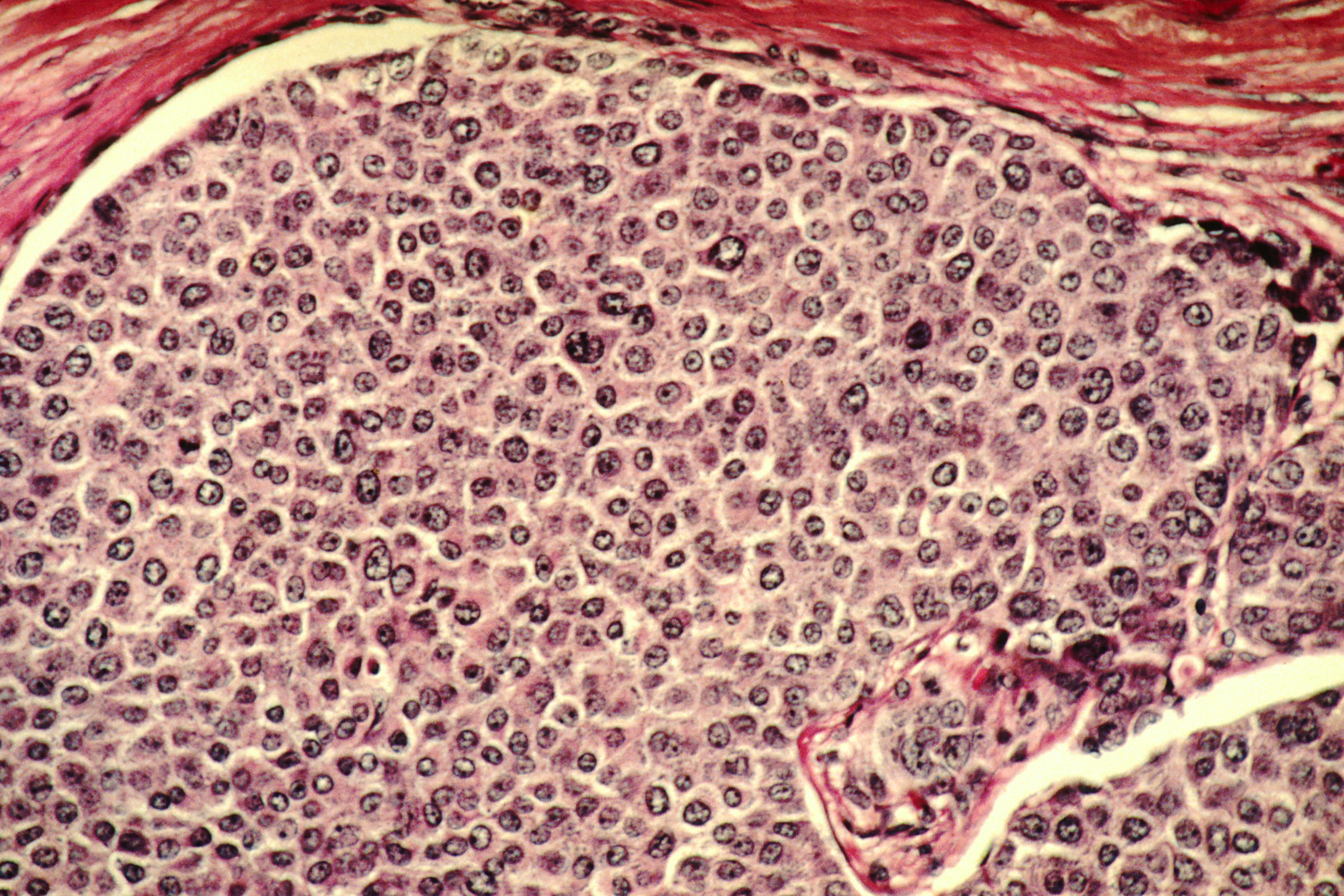
Breast cancer cells

== Classification ==
There are different categories of cancer cell, defined according to the cell type from which they originate.

- Carcinoma, the majority of cancer cells are epithelial in origin, beginning in a tissue that lines the inner or outer surfaces of the body.
- Leukaemia, originate in the tissues responsible for producing new blood cells, most commonly in the bone marrow.
- Lymphoma and myeloma, derived from cells of the immune system.
- Sarcoma, originating in connective tissue, including fat, muscle, and bone.
- Central nervous system, derived from cells of the brain and spinal cord.
- Mesothelioma, originating in the mesothelium; the lining of body cavities.
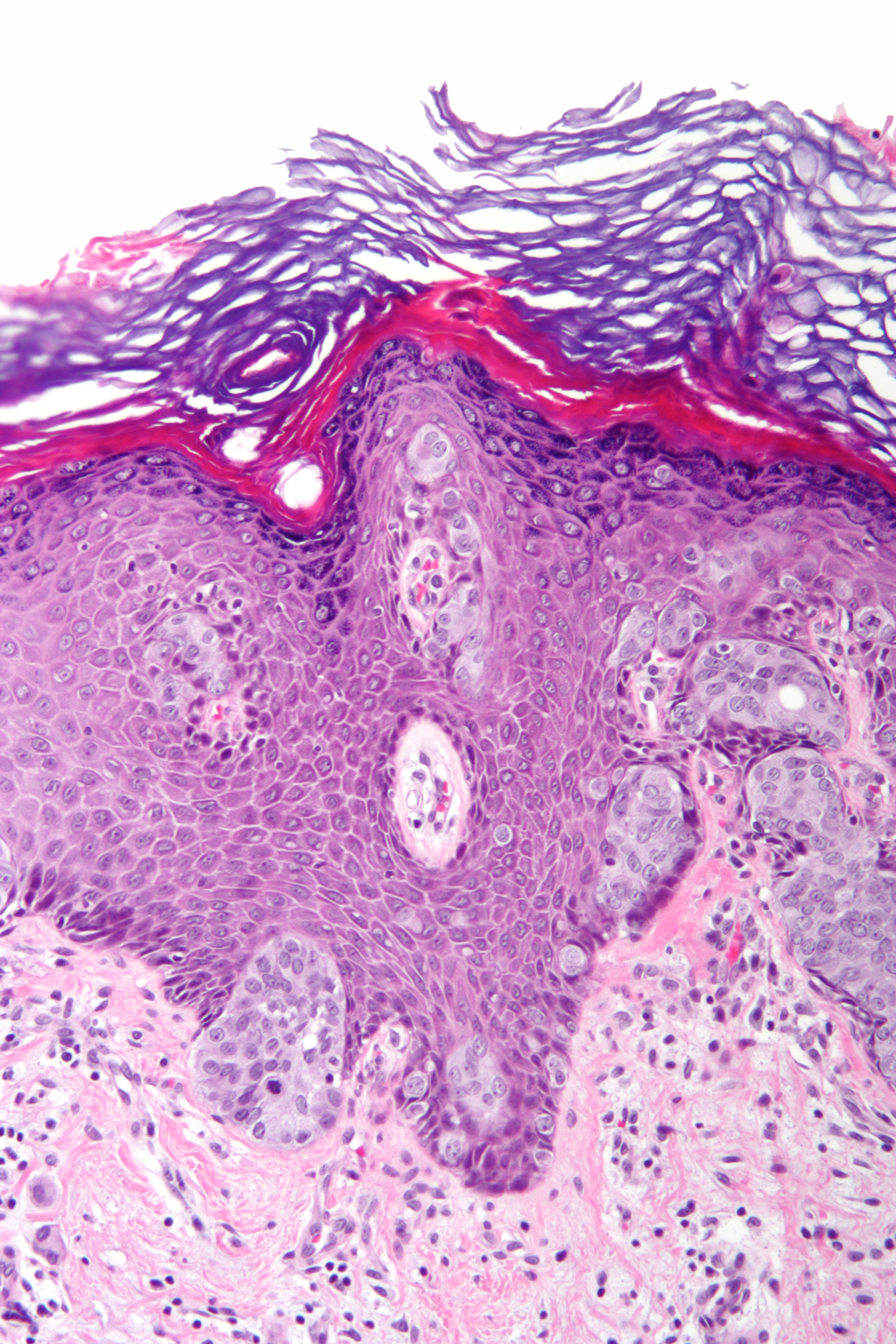
Carcinoma

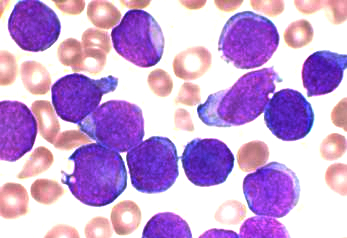
Leukaemia

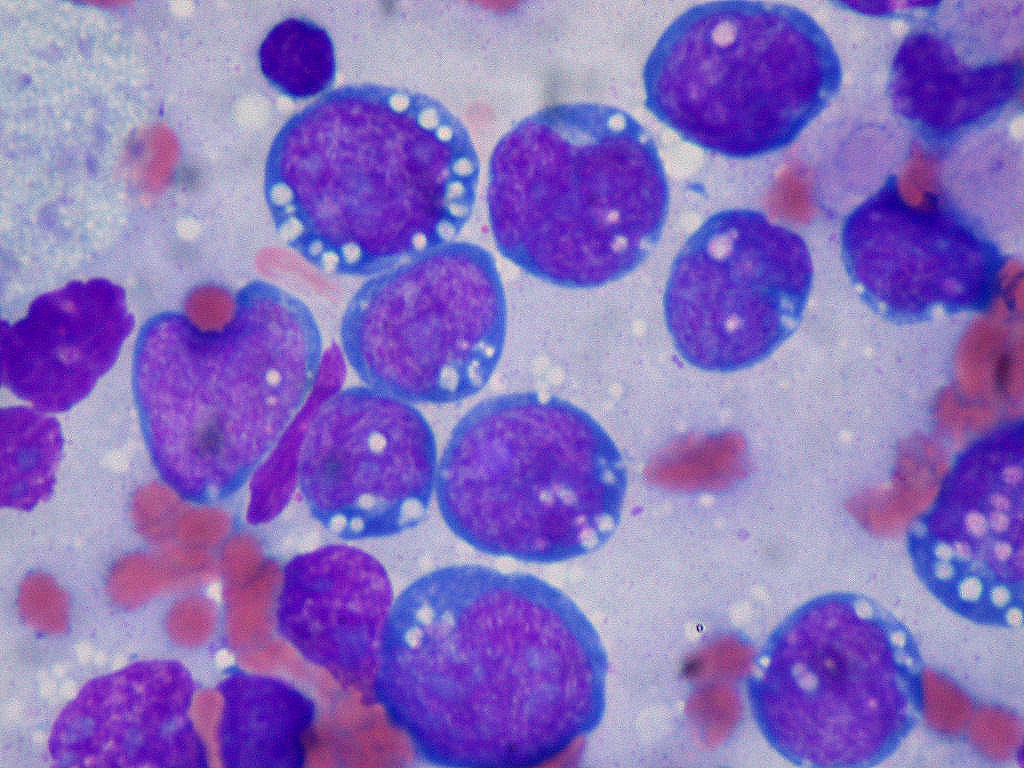
Lymphoma

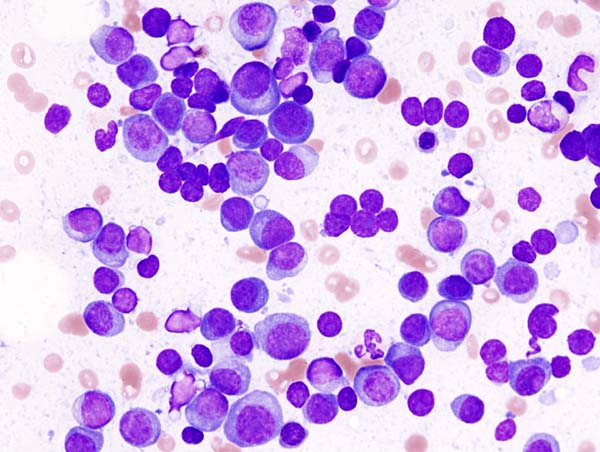
Myeloma

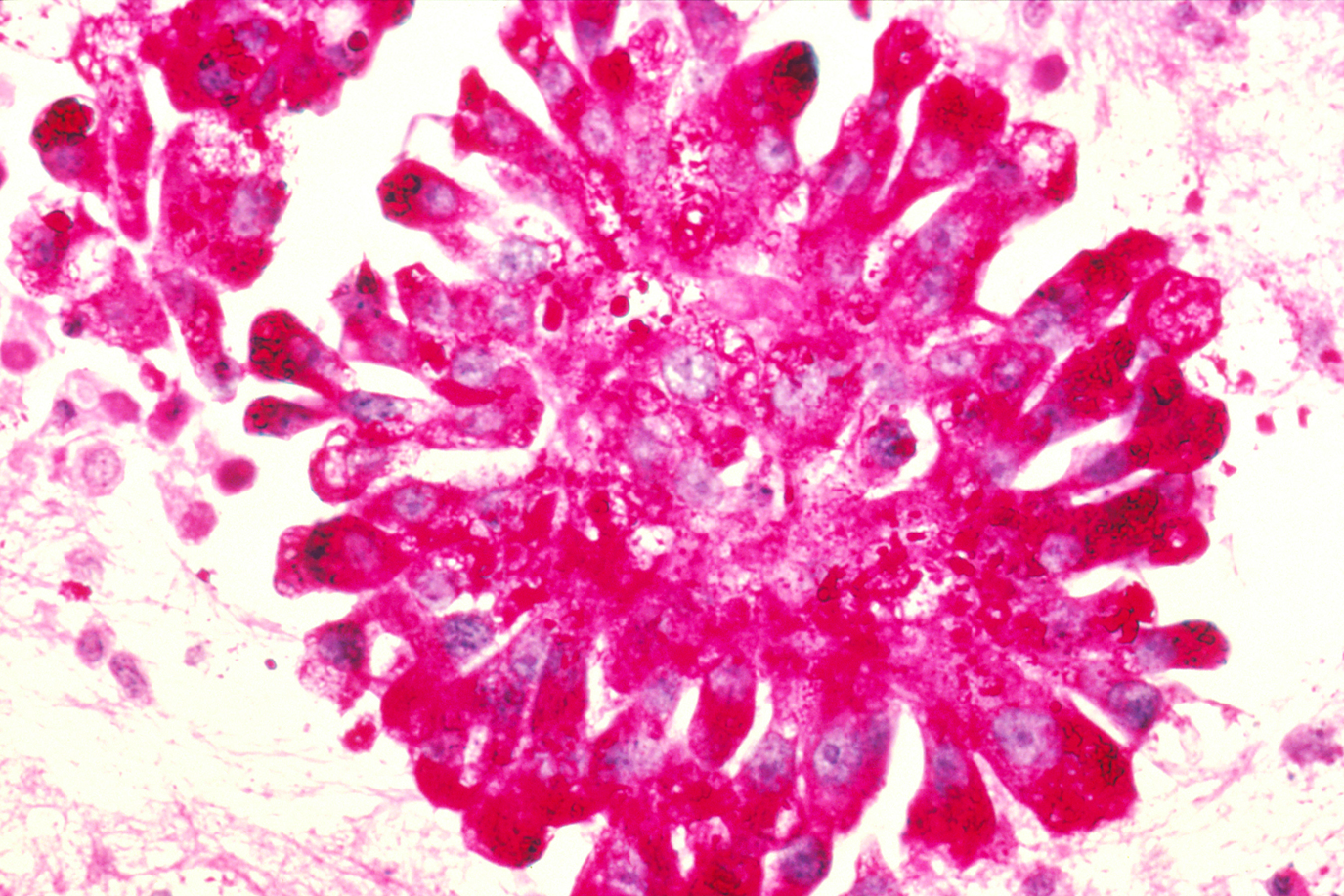
Sarcoma

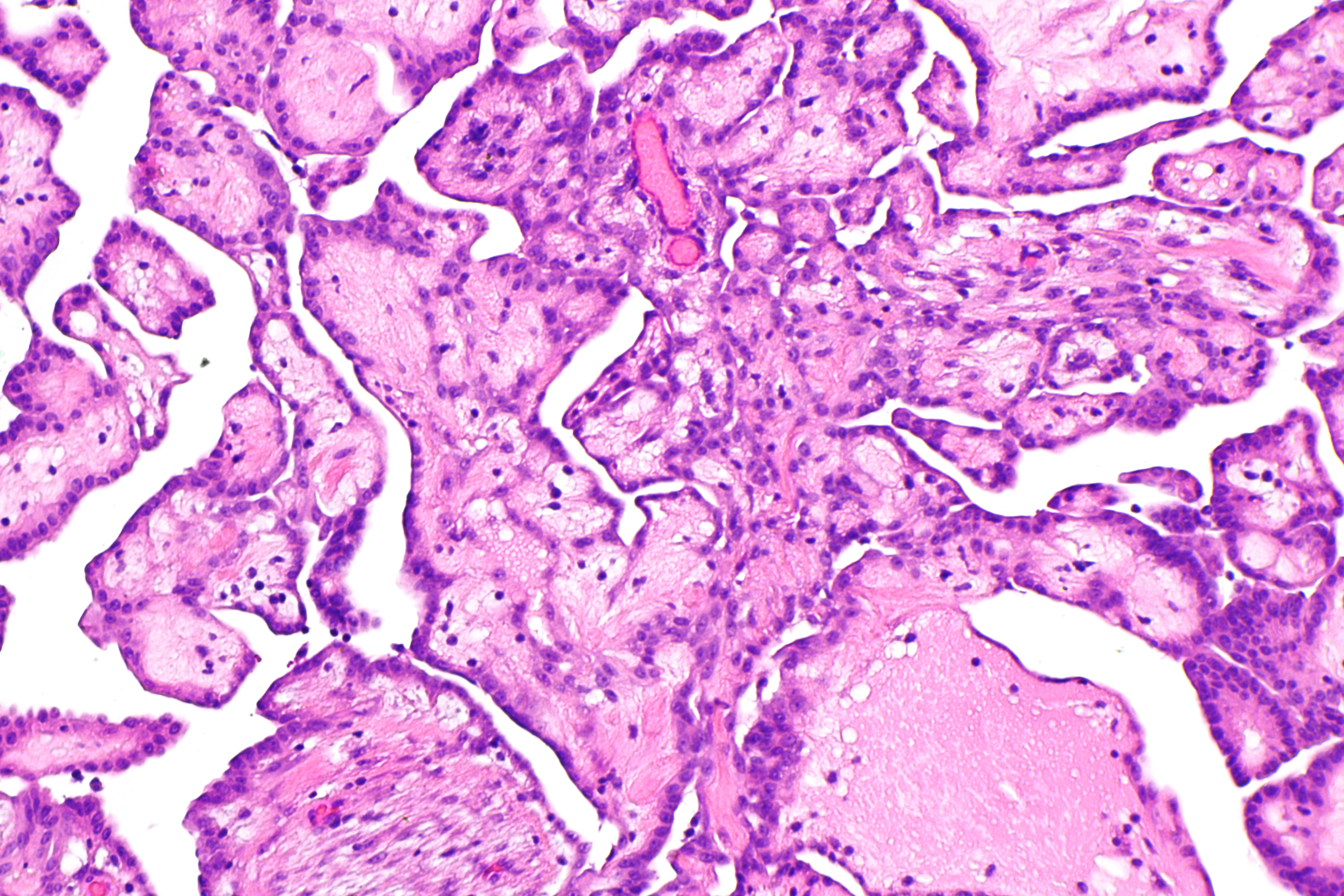
Mesothelioma

== Histology ==
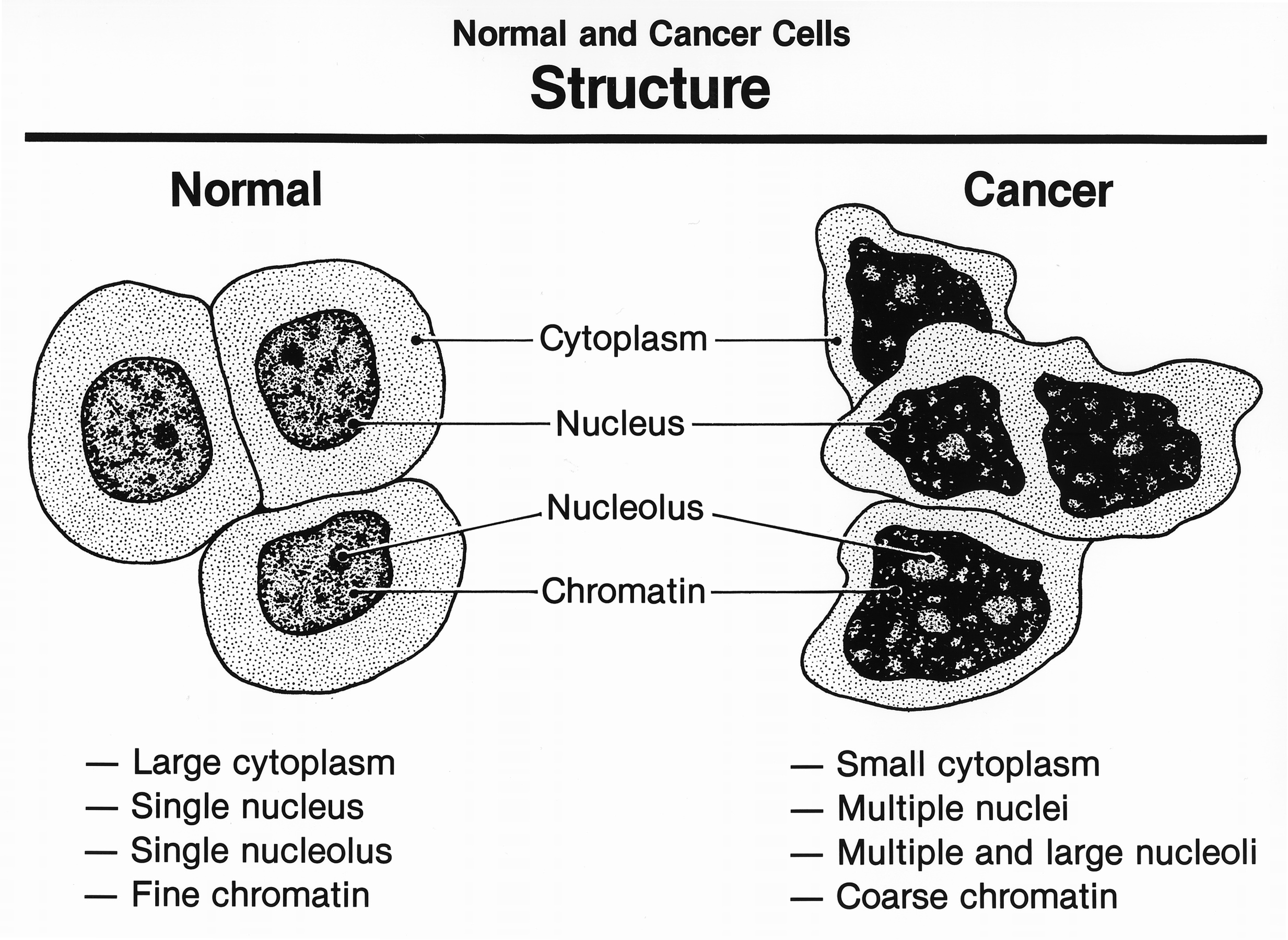
Histological features of normal cells and cancer cells

Cancer cells have distinguishing histological features visible under the microscope. The nucleus is often large and irregular, and the cytoplasm may also display abnormalities.

=== Nucleus ===
The shape, size, protein composition, and texture of the nucleus are often altered in malignant cells. The nucleus may acquire grooves, folds or indentations, chromatin may aggregate or disperse, and the nucleolus can become enlarged. In normal cells, the nucleus is often round or solid in shape, but in cancer cells the outline is often irregular. Different combinations of abnormalities are characteristic of different cancer types, to the extent that nuclear appearance can be used as a marker in cancer diagnostics and staging.

== Causes ==
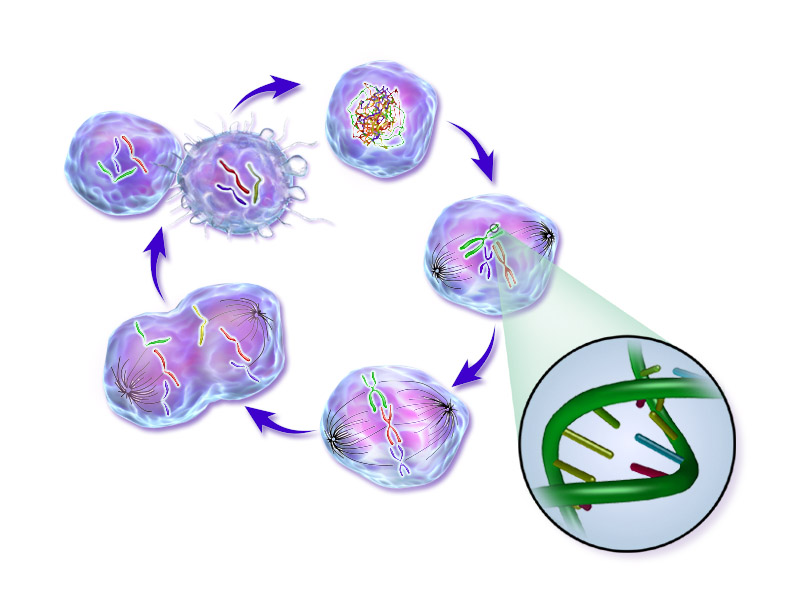
Life cycle of a cancer cell

Cancer cells are created when the genes responsible for regulating cell division are damaged. Carcinogenesis is caused by mutation and epimutation of the genetic material of normal cells, which upsets the normal balance between proliferation and cell death. This results in uncontrolled cell division in the body. The uncontrolled and often rapid proliferation of cells can lead to benign or malignant tumours (cancer). Benign tumors do not spread to other parts of the body or invade other tissues. Malignant tumors can invade other organs, spread to distant locations (metastasis) and become life-threatening.

More than one mutation is necessary for carcinogenesis. In fact, a series of several mutations to certain classes of genes is usually required before a normal cell will transform into a cancer cell.

Damage to DNA can be caused by exposure to radiation, chemicals, and other environmental sources, but mutations also accumulate naturally over time through uncorrected errors in DNA transcription, making age another risk factor. Oncoviruses can cause certain types of cancer, and genetics are also known to play a role.

Stem cell research suggests that excess SP2 protein may turn stem cells into cancer cells. However, a lack of particular co-stimulated molecules that aid in the way antigens react with lymphocytes can impair the natural killer cells' function, ultimately leading to cancer.

== DNA repair and mutation ==
When a cell is deficient in the capacity to repair DNA damages, such damages tend to be retained within the cell at an increased level. These damages, upon replication of the cell's DNA, may cause replication errors, including mutations that lead to cancer. Numerous inherited DNA repair disorders have been described that increase cancer risk (see Wikipedia article DNA repair-deficiency disorder). In addition, particular DNA repair enzymes have been found to be deficient in multiple cancers. For example, deficient expression of the DNA repair enzyme O-6-methylguanine-DNA methyltransferase is observed in several kinds of cancer.

Although a DNA repair deficiency can predispose a cell lineage to develop cancer, increased (rather than decreased) expression of a repair capability may also emerge in the progression of cancer cell lineages, and this capability may be clinically important as reviewed by Lingg et al. For instance, the DNA repair gene DMC1 encodes a protein that is normally expressed only in cells undergoing meiosis where it helps maintain an undamaged germ-line. However, DMC1 is also expressed in various cancer cell lines including cervical, breast, and lymphoma cancer cell lines. Expression of meiotic DNA repair genes such as DMC1 may promote tumor cell growth by dealing with endogenous DNA damage within the tumor, and may also diminish the effectiveness of anticancer therapy, such as radiation therapy.

== Pathology ==
Cells playing roles in the immune system, such as T-cells, are thought to use a dual receptor system when they determine whether or not to kill sick or damaged human cells. If a cell is under stress, turning into tumors, or infected, molecules including MIC-A and MIC-B are produced so that they can attach to the surface of the cell. These work to help macrophages detect and kill cancer cells.

== Discovery ==
Early evidence of human cancer can be interpreted from Egyptian papers (1538 BCE) and mummified remains. In 2016, a 1.7 million-year-old osteosarcoma was reported by Edward John Odes (a doctoral student in Anatomical Sciences from Witwatersrand Medical School, South Africa) and colleagues, representing the oldest documented malignant hominin cancer.

The understanding of cancer was significantly advanced during the Renaissance period and in the Age of Discovery. Sir Rudolf Virchow, a German biologist and politician, studied microscopic pathology, and linked his observations to illness. He is described as "the founder of cellular pathology". In 1845, Virchow and John Hughes Bennett independently observed an abnormal increase in white blood cells in patients. Virchow correctly identified the condition as a blood disease, and named it leukämie in 1847 (later anglicised to leukemia). In 1857, he was the first to describe a type of tumour called chordoma that originated from the clivus (at the base of the skull).

== Telomerase ==
Cancer cells have unique features that make them "immortal" according to some researchers. The enzyme telomerase is used to extend the cancer cell's life span. While the telomeres of most cells shorten after each division, eventually causing the cell to die, telomerase extends the cell's telomeres. This is a major reason that cancer cells can accumulate over time, creating tumors.

A diagram illustrating the distinction between cancer stem cell targeted and conventional cancer therapies

== Treatment ==
In February 2019, medical scientists announced that iridium attached to albumin, creating a photosensitized molecule, can penetrate cancer cells and, after being irradiated with light (a process called photodynamic therapy), destroy the cancer cells.

== See also ==
- Apoptosis
- BRCA1
- Carcinogen
- Carcinogenesis
- Epidemiology of cancer
- Oncology
- Tumour heterogeneity
