= ULBP1 =

Protein-coding gene in the species Homo sapiens

Identifiers
- Aliases: ULBP1, RAET1I, N2DL-1, NKG2DL1, UL16 binding protein 1
- External IDs: OMIM: 605697; MGI: 1925027; GeneCards: ULBP1

Gene location (Human)
Chr.	Chromosome 6 (human)
Band	6q25.1	Start	149,963,943 bp
Band	6q25.1	End	149,973,715 bp

Gene location (Mouse)
Chr.	Chromosome 10 (mouse)
Band	10|10 A1	Start	7,390,362 bp
Band	10|10 A1	End	7,423,638 bp
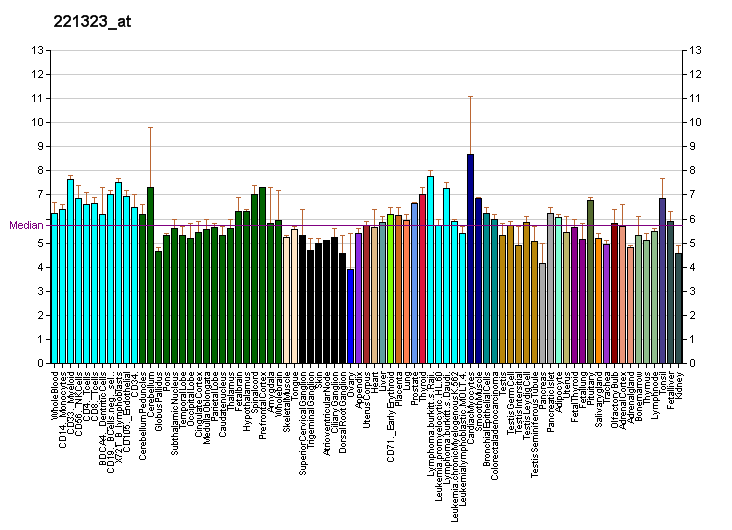
RNA expression pattern
Bgee	Human / Mouse (ortholog); Top expressed in: stromal cell of endometrium; pancreatic ductal cell; right lung; cerebellar hemisphere; right hemisphere of cerebellum; upper lobe of left lung; islet of Langerhans; ventricular zone; ganglionic eminence; right testis / Top expressed in: thymus; yolk sac; granulocyte; spermatocyte; secondary oocyte; placenta; embryo; epiblast; primary oocyte; embryo; More reference expression data
BioGPS	More reference expression data
Gene ontology
Molecular function	natural killer cell lectin-like receptor binding; protein binding
Cellular component	anchored component of membrane; anchored component of plasma membrane; endoplasmic reticulum; membrane; cytosol; plasma membrane; actin cytoskeleton; extracellular space; external side of plasma membrane
Biological process	natural killer cell activation; natural killer cell mediated cytotoxicity; regulation of immune response; immune system process; viral process; T cell mediated cytotoxicity; immune response; susceptibility to natural killer cell mediated cytotoxicity
Sources:Amigo / QuickGO
Orthologs
Databases	NCBI: entry; OMA: entry
Species	Human	Mouse
Entrez	80329	77777
Ensembl	ENSG00000111981	ENSMUSG00000079685
UniProt	Q9BZM6	n/a
RefSeq (mRNA)	NM_025218; NM_001317089	NM_029975
RefSeq (protein)	NP_001304018; NP_079494	n/a
Location (UCSC)	Chr 6: 149.96 – 149.97 Mb	Chr 10: 7.39 – 7.42 Mb
PubMed search
- Wikidata
View/Edit Human	View/Edit Mouse

UL16 binding protein 1 (ULBP1) is a cell surface glycoprotein encoded by ULBP1 gene located on the chromosome 6. ULBP1 is related to MHC class I molecules, but its gene maps outside the MHC locus. The domain structure of ULBP1 differs significantly from those of conventional MHC class I molecules. It does not contain the α3 domain and the transmembrane segment. ULBP1 is thus composed of only the α1α2 domain which is linked to the cell membrane by the GPI anchor. It functions as a stress-induced ligand for NKG2D receptor. ULBP1 is, for example, upregulated during HCMV infection. Binding of HCMV-encoded UL16 glycoprotein to ULBP1 interferes with cell surface localization of ULBP1; this represents another mechanism by which HCMV-infected cells might escape the immune system.
