= NKG2D =

Protein-coding gene in the species Homo sapiens

KLRK1
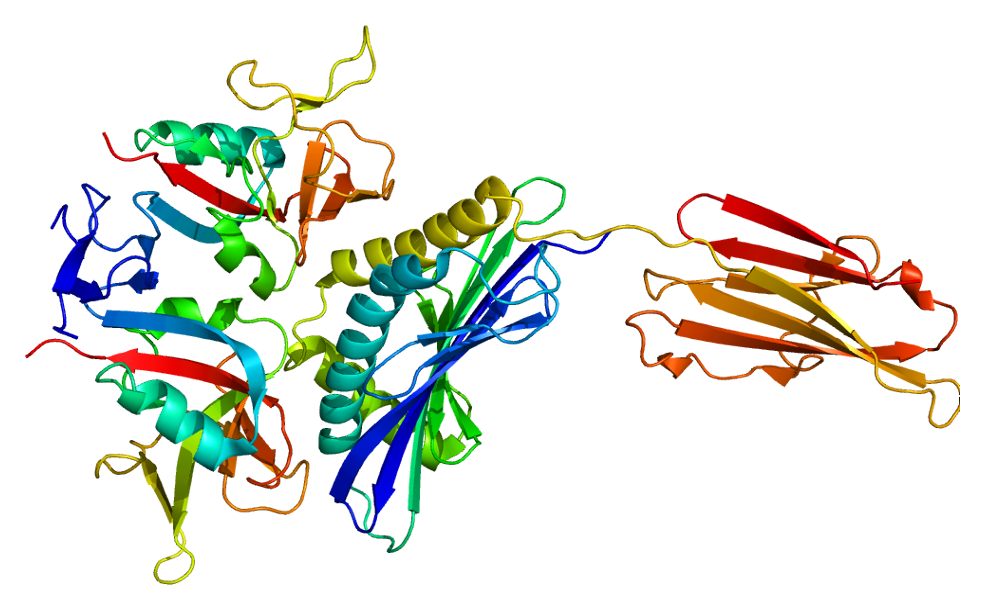

Identifiers
- Aliases: KLRK1, CD314, D12S2489E, KLR, NKG2-D, NKG2D, natural killer group 2D, killer cell lectin-like receptor K1, killer cell lectin like receptor K1
- External IDs: OMIM: 611817; MGI: 1196250; GeneCards: KLRK1
Available structures
PDB	Ortholog search: PDBe RCSB
PDB	List of PDB id codes 1KCG, 4PDC, 1HYR, 1MPU, 4S0U

Gene location (Human)
Chr.	Chromosome 12 (human)
Band	12p13.2	Start	10,372,353 bp
Band	12p13.2	End	10,391,874 bp

Gene location (Mouse)
Chr.	Chromosome 6 (mouse)
Band	6 F3|6 63.44 cM	Start	129,587,286 bp
Band	6 F3|6 63.44 cM	End	129,600,827 bp
RNA expression pattern
Bgee	Human / Mouse (ortholog); Top expressed in: granulocyte; spleen; lymph node; blood; appendix; gallbladder; upper lobe of left lung; mucosa of transverse colon; bone marrow; testicle / Top expressed in: superior surface of tongue; gallbladder; plantaris muscle; extensor digitorum longus muscle; morula; spleen; corneal stroma; mesenteric lymph nodes; granulocyte; interventricular septum; More reference expression data
BioGPS	n/a
Gene ontology
Molecular function	protein homodimerization activity; protein binding; MHC class Ib receptor activity; MHC class I protein binding; carbohydrate binding; signaling receptor activity; kinase binding
Cellular component	integral component of membrane; membrane; integral component of plasma membrane; cell surface; external side of plasma membrane; plasma membrane
Biological process	cell differentiation; adaptive immune response; immune system process; positive regulation of nitric oxide biosynthetic process; negative regulation of natural killer cell chemotaxis; T cell costimulation; natural killer cell activation; positive regulation of interferon-gamma production; stimulatory C-type lectin receptor signaling pathway; negative regulation of GTPase activity; regulation of immune response; cellular response to lipopolysaccharide; positive regulation of natural killer cell mediated cytotoxicity; signal transduction; defense response to Gram-positive bacterium; innate immune response; natural killer cell mediated cytotoxicity; positive regulation of natural killer cell mediated cytotoxicity directed against tumor cell target; positive regulation of myeloid dendritic cell activation; positive regulation of apoptotic process
Sources:Amigo / QuickGO
Orthologs
Databases	NCBI: entry; OMA: entry
Species	Human	Mouse
Entrez	22914	27007
Ensembl	ENSG00000213809	ENSMUSG00000030149
UniProt	P26718	O54709
RefSeq (mRNA)	NM_007360	NM_001083322; NM_001286018; NM_033078
RefSeq (protein)	NP_001186734	NP_001076791; NP_001272947; NP_149069
Location (UCSC)	Chr 12: 10.37 – 10.39 Mb	Chr 6: 129.59 – 129.6 Mb
PubMed search
- Wikidata
View/Edit Human	View/Edit Mouse

NKG2D is an activating receptor (transmembrane protein) belonging to the NKG2 family of C-type lectin-like receptors. NKG2D is encoded by KLRK1 (killer cell lectin like receptor K1) gene which is located in the NK-gene complex (NKC) situated on chromosome 6 in mice and chromosome 12 in humans. In mice, it is expressed by NK cells, NK1.1^{+} T cells, γδ T cells, activated CD8^{+} αβ T cells and activated macrophages. In humans, it is expressed by NK cells, γδ T cells and CD8^{+} αβ T cells. NKG2D recognizes induced-self proteins from MIC and RAET1/ULBP families which appear on the surface of stressed, malignant transformed, and infected cells.

== Structure ==
Human NKG2D receptor complex assembles into a hexameric structure. NKG2D itself forms a homodimer whose ectodomains serve for ligand binding. Each NKG2D monomer is associated with DAP10 dimer. This association is maintained by ionic interaction of a positively charged arginine present in a transmembrane segment of NKG2D and negatively charged aspartic acids within both transmembrane regions of DAP10 dimer. DAP10 functions as an adaptor protein and transduces the signal after the ligand binding by recruiting the p85 subunit of PI3K and Grb2-Vav1 complex which are responsible for subsequent downstream events.

In mice, alternative splicing generates two distinct NKG2D isoforms: the long one (NKG2D-L) and the short one (NKG2D-S). NKG2D-L binds DAP10 similarly to human NKG2D. By contrast, NKG2D-S associates with two adaptor proteins: DAP10 and DAP12. DAP10 recruits the p85 subunit of PI3K and a complex of Grb2 and Vav1. DAP12 bears ITAM motif and activates protein tyrosine kinases Syk and Zap70 signalling.

== NKG2D ligands ==
NKG2D ligands are induced-self proteins which are completely absent or present only at low levels on surface of normal cells, but they are overexpressed by infected, transformed, senescent and stressed cells. Their expression is regulated at different stages (transcription, mRNA and protein stabilization, cleavage from the cell surface) by various stress pathways. Among them, one of the most prominent stress pathways is DNA damage response. Genotoxic stress, stalled DNA replication, poorly regulated cell proliferation in tumorigenesis, viral replication or some viral products activate the ATM and ATR kinases. These kinases initiate the DNA damage response pathway which participates in NKG2D ligand upregulation. DNA damage response thus participate in alerting the immune system to the presence of potentially dangerous cells.

All NKG2D ligands are homologous to MHC class I molecules and are divided into two families: MIC and RAET1/ULBP.

=== MIC family ===
Human MIC genes are located within the MHC locus and are composed of seven members (MICA-G), of which only MICA and MICB produce functional transcripts. In mice, MIC genes are absent.

=== RAET1/ULBP family ===
Among ten known human RAET1/ULBP genes, six encode functional proteins: RAET1E/ULBP4, RAET1G/ULBP5, RAET1H/ULBP2, RAET1/ULBP1, RAET1L/ULBP6, RAET1N/ULBP3. In mice, proteins from orthologous RAET1/ULBP family fall into three subfamilies: Rae-1, H60, and MULT-1. ULBP2 is a stress-induced ligand often found on senescent cells.

=== NKG2D ligand regulation ===
NKG2D ligand expression is regulated on multiple levels such as transcriptional, RNA splicing, posttranscriptional and posttranslational. On the transcriptional level, NKG2D ligands can be regulated by transcription factors or regulatory sequences in various molecular pathways. Also, the regulation of NKG2D ligands after cell stress, proliferation signals, infection or oxidative stress is able to activate a DNA damage response (DDR). Ligation of sensor kinases ATM and ATR leads to activation of different checkpoint kinases, such as Chk1 and Chk2, which are important for the induction of MIC, ULBPs or Reat1 genes ). One of the major signals for cell expression of NKG2D is the triggering of DDR along with the induction of senescence program. RNA splicing is another mechanism influencing NKG2D ligand expression. For MICA, ULBP4 and ULBP5, alternative splicing isoforms have been shown. However, the molecular mechanisms of this type of regulation are unknown. In posttranscriptional regulation, stabilization of NKG2D ligand mRNA plays a key role. For example AUF1 protein, which mediates RNA degradation, constitutively targets mRNA of NKG2D ligands. Additionally, surface expression levels of NKG2D can be controlled by soluble forms of various protease-mediated cleavages and exosome expression.

== Function ==
NKG2D is a major recognition receptor for the detection and elimination of transformed and infected cells as its ligands are induced during cellular stress, either as a result of infection or genomic stress such as in cancer. In NK cells, NKG2D serves as an activating receptor, which itself is able to trigger cytotoxicity. The function of NKG2D on CD8^{+} T cells is to send co-stimulatory signals to activate them.

=== Role in viral infection ===
Viruses, as intracellular pathogens, can induce the expression of stress ligands for NKG2D. NKG2D is thought to be important in viral control as viruses have adapted mechanisms by which to evade NKG2D responses. For example, cytomegalovirus (CMV) encodes a protein, UL16, which binds to NKG2D ligands ULBP1 and 2 (thus their name "UL16-binding protein") and MICB, which prevents their surface expression.

=== Role in tumor control ===
As cancerous cells are "stressed", NKG2D ligands become upregulated, rendering the cell susceptible to NK cell-mediated lysis. However, some tumor cells have acquired the capacity to evade this immune surveillance. They have created the capacity of reducing and eliminating the high volume of NKG2DL present on the cell surface of tumor cells by secreting metalloproteases that cleave these ligands, and therefore they escape from the control of NK cells and their cytotoxic activity. TGF-β allows immune surveillance escape by inhibiting T and NK cell function. Tumor cells that can evade NKG2D responses are thus more likely to propagate.

=== Role in senescent cell removal ===
As part of the DNA damage response during induction of cellular senescence, cells upregulate the expression of NKG2D ligands that enable NK-mediated killing of senescent cells via the granule exocytosis pathway. Specifically, MICA and ULBP2 proteins on senescent cells are recognized by the NKG2D receptor on Natural Killer cells, which is necessary for efficient recognition and elimination of senescent cells.

Interventions to increase senescent cell surface ligands of the Natural Killer cell receptor NKG2D have been proposed as a senolytic therapy to remove senescent cells.

== NKG2D signalling ==
When NKG2D receptor binds to any of its ligands, an activation cascade starts for activating the respective immune cell. NKG2D does not possess any signaling elements within its intracellular domain. NKG2D forms a homodimer and associates with adaptor proteins in its transmembrane domain to a hexameric complex structure and initiate signaling cascades. In both mice and humans, this signalling depends on the association between NKG2D and DAP10 protein forming a complex. Upon ligand engagement, Tyr-X-X-Meth (YXXM) motif within the cytoplasmic domain of DAP10 recruits PI3K and Grb2 to activate NK cell cytotoxicity pathways. In mice, NKG2D associates with DAP 12, instead of DAP 10, and NKG2D-DAP12 complex is involved in IFN-γ production through the Syk and ZAP70 pathway.

Therefore, NKG2D is implicated in NK and other immune cells activation through the PI3K-AKT pathway. This pathway activation depend on two main basis. The first is the plasticity and structural changes of NKG2D (receptor) when binding to its ligands. The last one is the association of DAP10 in the intracellular domain of the receptor and the recruitment of PI3K and Grb.

== NKG2D and NK cells ==
NK cells are a key part of innate immunity, mainly involved in the early cytolytic defense against infections and tumors. NK cell activity is mediated by a variety of cell surface receptors with stimulatory and inhibitory activity. Under normal conditions, NK cells exist in an inactive state, with signaling dominated by inhibitory receptor activation.

NKG2G is a key stimulatory cell surface receptor. A low expression of the receptor is observed already in the early NK cells precursor stages, also the concentration of receptors is increased with maturation of NK cells. In mice, both NKG2D isoforms were detected. During resting state, predominance of long forms of NKG2D is typical, while in activated cells there is a higher number of short forms.

Interaction with IL-15 receptor (IL-15R) is a crucial factor for development, homeostasis and survival of NK cells and NKG2D signaling seems to be similarly critical. Connection between these two pathways is the binding of DAP10, adaptor protein and signal transducer, which associates with IL-15R or NKG2D, respectively. This phenomenon was proven by experiments on mice knocked out in Klrk1 – such mice have higher proliferation rate, faster differentiation and maturation of NK cells, resulting in a misbalance of immature NK cell subpopulations and higher susceptibility to apoptosis of NK cells.

NKG2D is involved in the generation of peripheral tolerance by the effective downregulation of NKG2D ligands, for the prevention from recognition by NK cells. It is supposed to act as a form of obstacle against NK cells' hyper-responsiveness to ligands, without complete education in bone marrow. Tolerance of NK cells is likewise observed during pregnancy, when placenta produces soluble and exosome-bound ligands for NKG2D and accumulates large number of NK cells which prevent recognition of fetus as non-self.

== NKG2D and T cells ==
For priming of T cells, binding of ligand on T cell receptors (TCR), co-stimulation by membrane receptors and cytokines are all necessary components. Co-stimulation regulates responsiveness of T cells and NKG2D is one of well-documented co-stimulatory molecules for T cells., CD28 –mediated co-stimulation is required for promotion of cytokine production and cytotoxicity in CD8^{+} T cells by NKG2D. For cytokine production and cytolytic killing by γδ T cells, priming is not required, however NKG2D expression is constitutive while solely triggering NKG2D in γδ T cells does not mediate cytotoxicity.

In T cells, NKG2D is associated with IL15-receptor signaling and also with the development of memory CD8 T cells. Key role in the transformation of CD8^{+} T cells into effector or memory types is played by mammalian target of rapamycin complex 1 (mTORC1) – memory precursor cells are characteristic by the low level of mTORC1 and for terminally differentiated CD8^{+} T cells, high level of mTORC1 activity is typical. Upregulation of antiapoptic Mcl-1 protein by NKG2D also induces formation of memory T cells. In murine memory T cell precursors, downregulation of T-bet transcription factor is likewise affected by NKG2D.

== NKG2D and B cells ==
Also development of B cells is regulated by NKG2D—NKG2D deficient mice have reduced number of B cells in spleen, which is partially depended on DAP10. In comparison to NK cells, mature B cells do not express NKG2D.

== See also ==
- CD94/NKG2
- Natural killer cell
- NKG2
- Immunoevasin
