= Cytomegalovirus colitis =

- Other names: CMV colitis
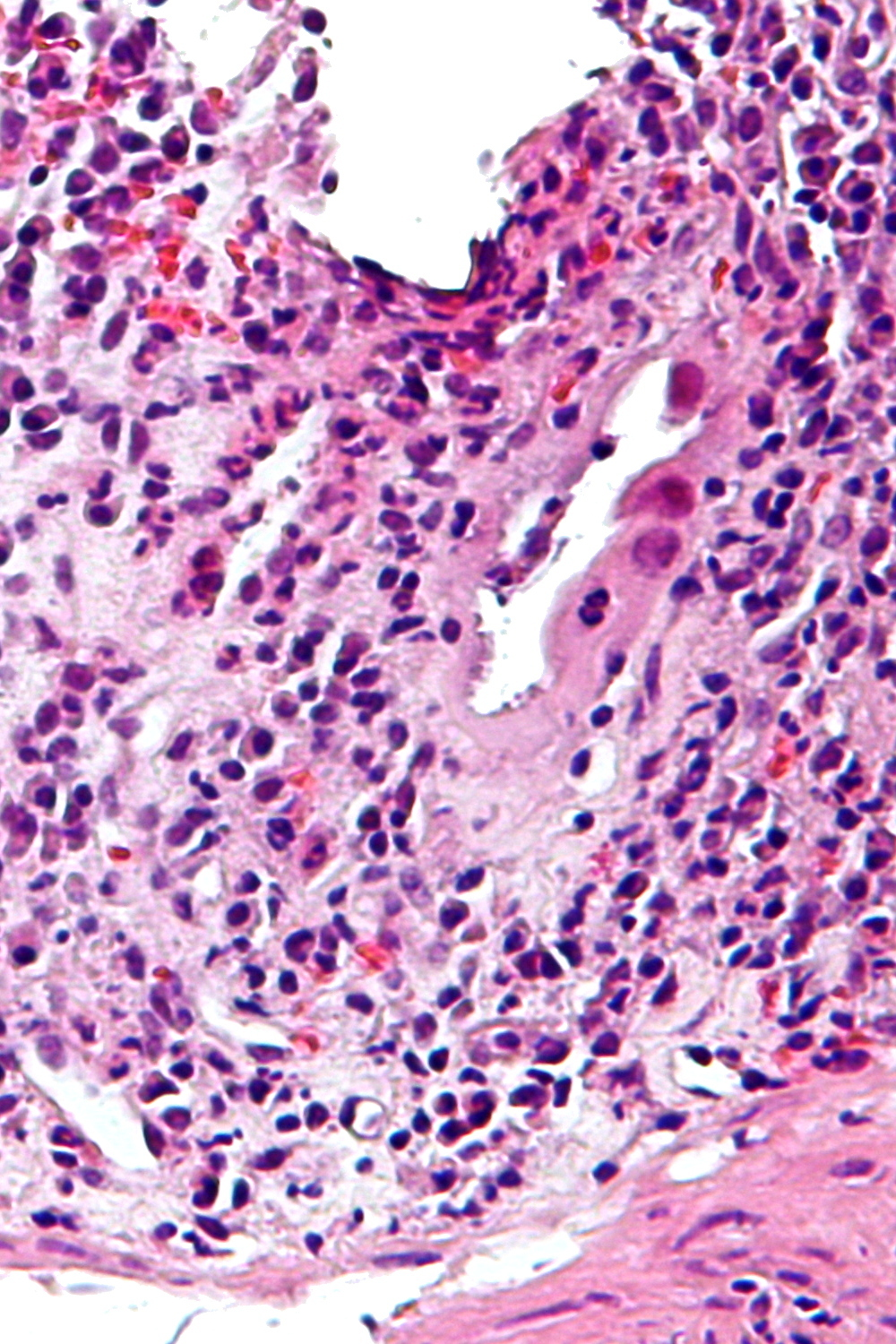
- Micrograph of CMV colitis. H&E stain.
- Specialty: Infectious diseases

Cytomegalovirus colitis (CMV colitis) is an inflammation of the colon.

== Causes ==
The infection is spread by saliva, urine, respiratory droplets, sexual contact, and blood transfusions. Most people are exposed to the virus in their lifetime, but it usually produces mild or no symptoms in healthy people.

However, serious CMV infections can occur in people with weakened immune systems. This includes patients receiving chemotherapy for cancer and patients on immune-suppressing medicines following an organ transplant.

In rare instances, more severe CMV infection involving the gastrointestinal tract has been reported in people with a healthy immune system.

=== Risk factors ===
The systemic use of corticosteroids in the context of inflammatory bowel disease can promote CMV infection in the colon. The corticosteroids used as a primary treatment for flare-up events of inflammatory bowel disease reduce the autoimmune activity of the T lymphocytes and monocytes that contribute to the inflammation of the colon and small intestine. By inhibiting the function of these leukocytes, corticosteroids reduce the inflammation caused by IBD, but this immunosuppression enables CMV to infect the colon. Similarly, use of the immunosuppressive drug that is required to decrease risk of rejection in patients who received transplant as Liver transplantation or Kidney transplantation is a risk factor for CMV infection.

== Diagnosis ==
CMV colitis may be clinically manifested with diarrhea (usually non-bloody), abdominal pain, weight loss and anorexia. The diagnosis of CMV colitis is based on serology, CMV antigen testing and colonoscopy with biopsy. CMV colitis usually occurs in immunocompromised patient and is much rarer in immunocompetent patients. Although it is known that CMV colitis is almost always caused by reactivation of latent CMV infection in immunocompromised patients, new infection of CMV or reinfection of different strain of CMV can cause colitis in immunocompetent hosts. Because asymptomatic CMV viremia and viruria is common and about 1/3 of symptomatic CMV infection is caused by reinfection of different strain of CMV, the diagnosis of CMV colitis needs more direct causality. It is practically achieved by colonoscopy or sigmoidoscopy tissue sampling and pathological evidence of CMV infection under microscope, more specifically macroscopic picture will show many ulcers that appear on the mucous membrane and microscopically the biopsy will show intranuclear and cytoplasmic inclusion bodies. Positive CMV IgG doesn't necessarily mean that it is reactivation of latent infection because of the possibility of reinfection of different strain.

== Treatment ==
The usual treatment is antivirals, specifically ganciclovir or valganciclovir. Severe CMV colitis may lead a colectomy.

== See also ==
- Crohn's disease
- Kidney transplantation
