= ULBP2 =

Protein-coding gene in the species Homo sapiens

Identifiers
- Aliases: ULBP2, N2DL2, RAET1H, ALCAN-alpha, NKG2DL2, UL16 binding protein 2, RAET1L
- External IDs: OMIM: 605698; GeneCards: ULBP2

Gene location (Human)
Chr.	Chromosome 6 (human)
Band	6q25.1	Start	149,942,014 bp
Band	6q25.1	End	149,949,235 bp
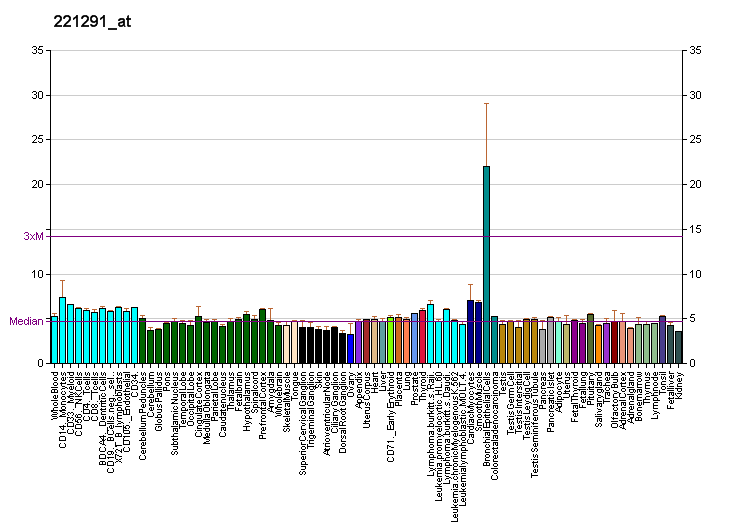
RNA expression pattern
Bgee	Human / Mouse (ortholog); Top expressed in: gingival epithelium; mucosa of pharynx; oral cavity; cartilage tissue; stromal cell of endometrium; sperm; amniotic fluid; cervix epithelium; right lung; middle temporal gyrus / n/a; More reference expression data
BioGPS	More reference expression data
Gene ontology
Molecular function	natural killer cell lectin-like receptor binding; protein binding
Cellular component	cell surface; anchored component of plasma membrane; anchored component of membrane; membrane; extracellular region; extracellular space; plasma membrane; endoplasmic reticulum; external side of plasma membrane
Biological process	natural killer cell activation; natural killer cell mediated cytotoxicity; immune system process; viral process; T cell mediated cytotoxicity; immune response; susceptibility to natural killer cell mediated cytotoxicity
Sources:Amigo / QuickGO
Orthologs
Databases	NCBI: entry; OMA: entry
Species	Human	Mouse
Entrez	80328	n/a
Ensembl	ENSG00000131015	n/a
UniProt	Q9BZM5	n/a
RefSeq (mRNA)	NM_025217	n/a
RefSeq (protein)	NP_079493	n/a
Location (UCSC)	Chr 6: 149.94 – 149.95 Mb	n/a
PubMed search		n/a
- Wikidata
View/Edit Human

UL16 binding protein 2 (ULBP2) is a cell surface glycoprotein encoded by ULBP2 gene located on the chromosome 6. ULBP2 is related to MHC class I molecules, but its gene maps outside the MHC locus. The domain structure of ULBP2 differs significantly from those of conventional MHC class I molecules. It does not contain the α3 domain and the transmembrane segment. ULBP2 is thus composed of only the α1α2 domain which is linked to the cell membrane by the GPI anchor.

ULBP2 functions as a stress-induced ligand for the NKG2D killer activation receptor on natural killer cells.
