= HCST (gene) =

Protein-coding gene in the species Homo sapiens

Identifiers
- Aliases: HCST, DAP10, KAP10, PIK3AP, hematopoietic cell signal transducer
- External IDs: OMIM: 604089; MGI: 1344360; HomoloGene: 8024; GeneCards: HCST; OMA:HCST - orthologs

Gene location (Human)
Chr.	Chromosome 19 (human)
Band	19q13.12	Start	35,902,529 bp
Band	19q13.12	End	35,904,377 bp

Gene location (Mouse)
Chr.	Chromosome 7 (mouse)
Band	7 B1|7 17.45 cM	Start	30,117,137 bp
Band	7 B1|7 17.45 cM	End	30,119,279 bp
RNA expression pattern
Bgee	Human / Mouse (ortholog); Top expressed in: granulocyte; monocyte; bone marrow; blood; bone marrow cells; spleen; appendix; lymph node; thymus; trabecular bone / Top expressed in: granulocyte; thymus; tibiofemoral joint; blood; spleen; mesenteric lymph nodes; embryo; embryo; duodenum; right kidney; More reference expression data
BioGPS	n/a
Gene ontology
Molecular function	signaling receptor binding; protein binding; phosphatidylinositol 3-kinase binding
Cellular component	integral component of membrane; cell surface; plasma membrane; membrane
Biological process	protein phosphorylation; regulation of immune response; positive regulation of phosphatidylinositol 3-kinase signaling
Sources:Amigo / QuickGO
Orthologs
Species	Human	Mouse
Entrez	10870	23900
Ensembl	ENSG00000126264	ENSMUSG00000064109
UniProt	Q9UBK5	Q9QUJ0
RefSeq (mRNA)	NM_014266; NM_001007469	NM_011827
RefSeq (protein)	NP_001007470; NP_055081	NP_035957
Location (UCSC)	Chr 19: 35.9 – 35.9 Mb	Chr 7: 30.12 – 30.12 Mb
PubMed search
- Wikidata
View/Edit Human	View/Edit Mouse

Hematopoietic cell signal transducer is a protein that in humans is encoded by the HCST gene.

This gene encodes a transmembrane signaling adaptor that contains a YxxM motif in its cytoplasmic domain. The encoded protein may form part of the immune recognition receptor complex with the C-type lectin-like receptor NKG2D. As part of this receptor complex, this protein may activate phosphatidylinositol 3-kinase dependent signaling pathways through its intracytoplasmic YxxM motif. This receptor complex may have a role in cell survival and proliferation by activation of NK and T cell responses. Alternative splicing results in two transcript variants encoding different isoforms.
