= MHC class I polypeptide–related sequence B =

Protein-coding gene in the species Homo sapiens

MICB
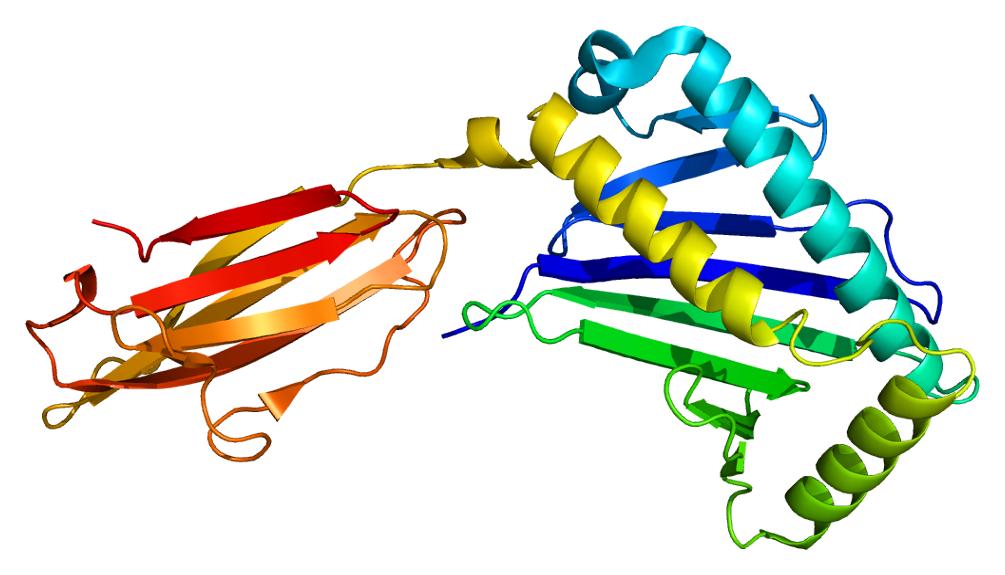

Identifiers
- Aliases: MICB, PERB11.2, MHC class I polypeptide-related sequence B
- External IDs: OMIM: 602436; MGI: 2179989; GeneCards: MICB
Available structures
PDB	Ortholog search: PDBe RCSB
PDB	List of PDB id codes 1JE6, 2WY3

Gene location (Human)
Chr.	Chromosome 6 (human)
Band	6p21.33	Start	31,494,881 bp
Band	6p21.33	End	31,511,124 bp

Gene location (Mouse)
Chr.	Chromosome 7 (mouse)
Band	7 A3|7 9.35 cM	Start	18,573,891 bp
Band	7 A3|7 9.35 cM	End	18,599,327 bp
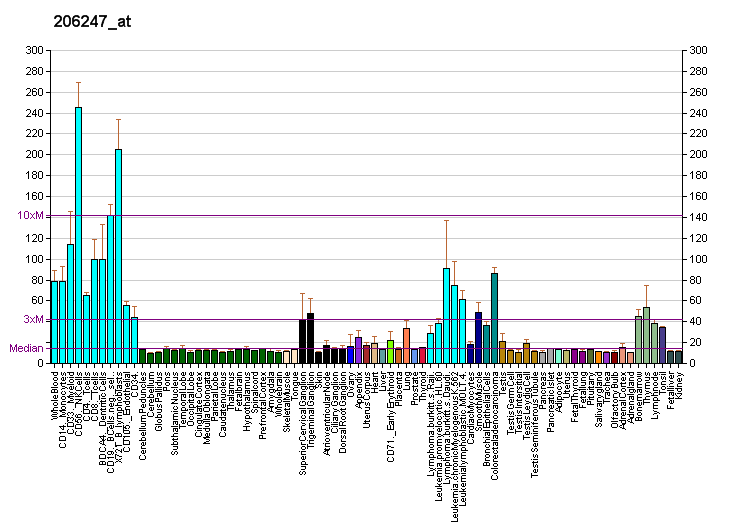
RNA expression pattern
Bgee	Human / Mouse (ortholog); Top expressed in: granulocyte; monocyte; blood; stromal cell of endometrium; lymph node; bone marrow; gonad; bone marrow cell; spleen; appendix / Top expressed in: urinary bladder; uterus; lung; ovary; white adipose tissue; adrenal gland; zone of skin; esophagus; muscle tissue; skeletal muscle tissue; More reference expression data
BioGPS	More reference expression data
Gene ontology
Molecular function	natural killer cell lectin-like receptor binding
Cellular component	integral component of membrane; cell surface; plasma membrane; membrane; extracellular space; external side of plasma membrane
Biological process	immune system process; gamma-delta T cell activation; viral process; response to heat; cytolysis; adaptive immune response; response to oxidative stress; response to retinoic acid; T cell mediated cytotoxicity; natural killer cell mediated cytotoxicity; regulation of immune response; immune response-activating cell surface receptor signaling pathway; immune response; natural killer cell activation; susceptibility to natural killer cell mediated cytotoxicity
Sources:Amigo / QuickGO
Orthologs
Databases	NCBI: entry; OMA: entry
Species	Human	Mouse
Entrez	4277	243864
Ensembl	ENSG00000231179; ENSG00000224378; ENSG00000206449; ENSG00000227772; ENSG00000238289 ENSG00000231372; ENSG00000234218; ENSG00000204516	ENSMUSG00000040987
UniProt	Q29980	Q8HWE5
RefSeq (mRNA)	NM_001289160; NM_001289161; NM_005931	NM_153760; NM_153761
RefSeq (protein)	NP_001276089; NP_001276090; NP_005922	NP_715641; NP_715642
Location (UCSC)	Chr 6: 31.49 – 31.51 Mb	Chr 7: 18.57 – 18.6 Mb
PubMed search
- Wikidata
View/Edit Human	View/Edit Mouse

MHC class I polypeptide-related sequence B (MICB) is a protein that is encoded by the MICB gene located within MHC locus. MICB is related to MHC class I and has similar domain structure, which is made up of external α1α2α3 domain, transmembrane segment and C-terminal cytoplasmic tail. MICB is a stress-induced ligand for NKG2D receptor. The heat shock stress pathway is involved in the regulation of MICB expression as transcription of MICB is regulated by promoter heat shock element.

== See also ==
- MICA
