= Induced-self antigen =

Induced-self Antigens or cell surface molecules that appear when a cell undergoes infection, stress, injury, inflammatory response, tissue remodeling, and malignant transformation. Induced-self antigens are antigens that under normal circumstances are not present or present only in small quantities. When they appear, the immune system is able to detect abnormal cells.

Induced-self antigens may elicit an immune response that yields various results. The immune system can either kill the altered cell, become tolerant to the antigen, or produce an autoimmune response. The outcomes are dependent on the quantity and length of time that the antigen is expressed, the tissue in which the antigen is found, the presence of inflammation, and availability of costimulation signals.

== Recognition by Immune Receptors ==
The most well described receptor that participates in induced self recognition is NKG₂D. Natural killer cells and subsets of T cells and NKT cells express an activating receptor called NKG₂D. Identifies ligands that are not present or expressed in normal cells, but are elevated in cells under stress, viral infection, DNA damage or tumor transformation.

The NKG₂D ligand families that are important include MICA, MICB, and ULBP/RAET1. These ligands, on infected or transformed cells, can trigger activation of natural killer cells and induce the secretion of inflammatory cytokines and cytotoxic molecules. The expression of an induced self ligand, does not necessarily lead to destruction. The final response also relies on inhibitory receptors, antigen persistence, tissue conditions and balance of immune signals.

Induced self antigens can also be recognized by adaptive immune cells. In addition to obtaining antigens from infected, damaged or transformed cells, dendritic cells can present them to CD8+ T cells via MHC class I molecules. This mechanism is termed cross-presentation, and enables CD8+ cytotoxic T cells to respond even if the dendritic cell is not infected.

== Cross Presentation and Immune Activation ==
Cross-presentation is essential for antiviral immunity and tumor surveillance. Infection causes dendritic cells to capture material from infected cells, process it and display viral peptides on MHC class I molecules. This triggers CD8+ T lymphocytes that then recognize and kill cells displaying the same antigen later on.

This can lead to the immune system being stimulated with altered self-antigens due to damaged tissues or transformed cells. Thus, cross-presentation links innate recognition of cellular damage to adaptive immune responses to infected or abnormal cells.

Cross-presentation does not always produce an aggressive immune response. When the antigen is presented without adequate inflammatory or costimulation signals, the antigen-specific T cells can be rendered inactive or tolerant. This means that the immune system has to be able to tell whether an induced-self antigen is a dangerous threat or a normal or innocent change in tissue state.

== Induced Self Antigens and T-Cell Tolerance ==
There are several mechanisms by which induced or tissue-restricted self-antigens can induce tolerance of the immune system. These include T-cell anergy, self-reactive T-cell deletion, receptor desensitization, and suppression by regulatory T cells.

The tolerance is not necessarily the same if the antigen is systemic (body) or contained to a particular tissue. Regulatory T cells and receptor desensitization by CTLA-4 may be effective in controlling tissue-restricted antigens, while receptor desensitization or deletion may be more effective in the case of systemic antigens.

The length of the antigen expression is also important. Temporary expression can activate effector T cells and inflammation, whereas prolonged expression can result in functional inactivation of effector cells and maintenance or growth of regulatory T cells. It is known that the same antigen can induce immunity when presented for a short time, but induce tolerance when presented for a long time.

== B-Cell Responses and the Central Nervous System ==
Induced-self antigens can activate both B cells and NK cells and T cells. Clonally expanded antibody secreting cells that recognized a glycoprotein from a virus due to its transient induction as a Neoself antigen in astrocytes were discovered in a study of central nervous system inflammation. These cells were class switched and somatically mutated and were still present in the brain after the initial viral infection had cleared.

A continued antigen expression resulted in a different response. The expanded B-cell population had less specificity for the Neoself antigen when it was continuously present in the CNS, indicating local tolerance. Patients with relapsing multiple sclerosis (MS) also had expanded and class switched antibody secreting cells identified in the cerebrospinal fluid of their patients.

These results indicate the potential for induced self antigens to play a role in protective immunity and chronic inflammation. Temporary antigen expression could induce immune surveillance while persistent expression could induce tolerance or autoimmunity, depending on the context.

== Antigens Released During Cellular Damage ==
Self material is exposed that is typically not accessible to the immune system because of cellular damage and apoptosis.Damage and apoptosis can bring the exposure of self material that is normally sequestered from the immune system. Microparticles are vesicles, which are membrane bound small vesicles, released from activated or dying cells. They can include DNA, nuclear proteins, membrane proteins and molecules that have antigenic or inflammatory properties.

DNA within the Microparticles can be recognized by B cell receptors and innate immune sensors. Self antigens acquire immunological significance in diseases like systemic lupus erythematosus, where they can participate in the immune complex formation and the generation of self antigen specific antibodies, due to changes in their structure, location, or to the presence of inflammatory molecules.

Induced self recognition is an important characteristic of the process the antigen does not have to be newly synthesized. Self antigen can be “induced” from the immune system's point of view, when it is exposed to an inflammatory environment for the first time due to damage to the tissue.

== Autoimmunity and Transformed Self ==
The relevance of induced-self recognition in autoimmune disease and tissue injury following transplantation is also relevant. The immune responses against self-antigens could arise in the event of disruption of the tolerance mechanisms due to tissue damage, inflammation or antigen presentation.

A study of diabetic autoimmunity also illustrates that certain auto-reactive peptides in the context of MHC molecules may play a role in the immune response to the disease. The following factors may affect the activity of self reactive T cells and whether they remain under control or contribute to destruction of insulin-producing pancreatic B cells: genetic susceptibility, environment, and presentation of certain antigenic epitopes.

All of the examples are not necessarily induced-self antigens. Instead, they demonstrate the role that impaired antigen processing, tissue damage, and inflammatory mediators can play in increased visibility and/or immunogenicity of normal self-antigens.

== Tumor Recognition ==
Tumor cells are often stressed, metabolizing abnormally, proliferating rapidly, and suffering from DNA damage. The changes can enhance the expression of induced-self-ligands, such as NKG₂D ligands. This makes the tumor cells easier to see by NK cells and cytotoxic T cells.

Such a mechanism could be applied in cancer immunology. Enhancing the expression or presentation of stress-associated ligands will enhance the immune recognition of tumor cells. Tumors, however, can escape immune destruction by decreasing the expression of ligands, secreting soluble ligands, expressing immunosuppressive molecules, or downregulating the function of the NK cells and the function of T cells.
