= NKG2 =

Mammalian protein found in Homo sapiens

killer cell lectin-like receptor subfamily C, member 1

Identifiers
- Symbol: KLRC1
- Alt. symbols: NKG2, NKG2-A, NKG2-B, CD159a
- NCBI gene: 3821
- HGNC: 6374
- OMIM: 161555
- RefSeq: NM_007328
- UniProt: P26715

Other data
- Locus: Chr. 12 p13
Search for
- Structures: Swiss-model
- Domains: InterPro

NKG2 also known as CD159 (Cluster of Differentiation 159) is a receptor family for natural killer cells (NK cells). There are 7 NKG2 members: A, B, C, D, E, F and H. NKG2D is an activating receptor on the NK cell surface. NKG2A dimerizes with CD94 to make an inhibitory receptor (CD94/NKG2A).

IPH2201 is a monoclonal antibody targeted at NKG2A.

== Gene expression ==
In both humans and mice, genes encoding the NKG2 family are clustered – in human genome on chromosome 12, in mouse on chromosome 6. They are generally expressed on NK cells and a subset of CD8^{+} T cells, although the expression of NKG2D was also confirmed on γδ T cells, NKT cells, and even on some subsets of CD4^{+} T cells or myeloid cells. NKG2D expression can also be present on cancer cells and is proven to stimulate oncogenic bioenergetic metabolism, proliferation and metastases generation.

On NK cells, NKG2 genes are expressed through the ontogeny as well as in adulthood. As about 90% of fetal NK cells express NKG2 genes, one of the proposed functions of the gene family is contribution to self-tolerance. The level of expression of NKG2 genes is not constant, rather it is affected by cytokine environment (mainly interleukin-2 (IL-2), IL-7 and IL-15).

For CD8^{+} T lymphocytes, NKG2 family expression is believed to be a marker of activated or memory T cells. The expression is triggered namely by IL-15, IL-12, IL-10 and TGF-β. CD94/NKG2 expression is shown to significantly increase the survival of T cells.

== Structure ==
NKG2 are members of the C-type lectin-like receptor superfamily. NKG2A, -B, -C, -E and -H form heterodimers with CD94, linked by disulfide bonds, whereas NKG2D forms homodimers.

Inhibitory molecules NKG2A and its splice variant NKG2B contain immunoreceptor tyrosine-based inhibition motifs (ITIMs) in the intracellular part of the molecule. Activatory molecules NKG2C, NKG2E and its splice variant NKG2H do not have an activating immunoreceptor tyrosine-based activation motifs (ITAMs) in their molecule. Rather, they contain a positively charged residue in their transmembrane regions by which they interact with adaptor molecules containing ITAMs, mainly DNAX-activating protein of 12 kDa (DAP-12).

NKG2D pairs with either DAP-12 or DAP-10, depending on the isoform. There are two isoforms in mice – the long isoform (NKG2D-L) pairs only with DAP-10, whereas the short isoform (NKG2-S) can also pair with DAP-12. Only long isoform is present in humans.

NKG2F also does not dimerize with CD94, rather it associates with DAP-12. It is only expressed on membranes of intracellular compartments.

== Signalling ==
Inhibitory NKG2 molecules containing ITIMs recruite the Src homology 2 domain containing phosphatases SHP-1 and SHP-2, which leads to the inhibition of cytotoxicity. ITAMs, included in DAP-12, on the other hand, recruite the Src homology domain containing kinases Syk (spleen tyrosine kinase) or Zap70 (Zeta-chain-associated protein kinase 70). Kinase activation is followed by NK cell degranulation and transcription of cytokine and chemokine genes.

DAP-10 connects to GRB2 or p85, leading to signalling through phosphoinositide 3-kinase (PI3K) and other molecules, leading to cytotoxicity.

== Ligands ==
Ligands of CD94/NKG2 heterodimeric molecules are nonclassical MHC class I molecules – Qa1^{b} molecules in mice and HLA-E in humans. These molecules both present sequences from the digested leading peptides of classical MHC class I molecules. This enables the monitoring of classical MHC class I expression on target cells.

NKG2D recognizes mostly stress-induced proteins, namely human MHC class-I-chain related protein (MIC-A) and MIC-B, and also other stress-induced proteins common to humans and mice – retinoic acid early transcript 1 (Rae1) and RAET1 in humans, H60 and UL16-binding protein-like transcript 1 (Mult1) in mice, and the UL16-binding proteins (ULBPs) in humans.

== Function ==
=== CD94/NKG2 ===
NKG2A was documented to promote survival in T cells. Along with its splice variant NKG2B, these molecules are inhibitory and lead to a decrease in cytotoxicity. NKG2C and NKG2E (and its splice variant NKG2H) recognize the same ligand with different (usually lower in physiological conditions) affinity. However, the affinity for HLA-E (or Qa1^{b}) can drastically change after a small change in the presented peptide, which can lead to NK cell activation.

CD94/NKG2 and their ligands can also play a role in certain diseases, where their expression can be modified on different cell types. These include viral and bacterial infections by HCMV, HIV-1 and Hepatitis virus type C (HCV) in humans, or LCMV, HSV-1, Influenza and Listeria monocytogenes infections in mice. In cancers, a role of CD94/NKG2 was demonstrated for melanoma, cervical cancer, lymphoma/leukemia and more. NKG2 match can also prevent graft versus leukemia effect (GvL) as well as the graft versus host disease (GvHD).

=== NKG2D ===
NKG2D is an activating receptor playing a role in the cell-mediated control of some cancers. Many tumors avoid the cytotoxicity by excreting soluble NKG2D ligands or secreting TGF-β, leading to the downregulation of the NKG2D expression. NKG2D ligands are also upregulated by cells infected with viral pathogens. Certain viruses can produce proteins that block the expression of NKG2D ligands on the cell surface to decrease the recognition by NK cells, increasing virus pathogenicity.

== See also ==
- Cluster of differentiation
- CD94/NKG2
- NKG2D
