= Adaptive NK cell =

Specialized subtype of cytotoxic lymphocyte

Adaptive natural killer cell
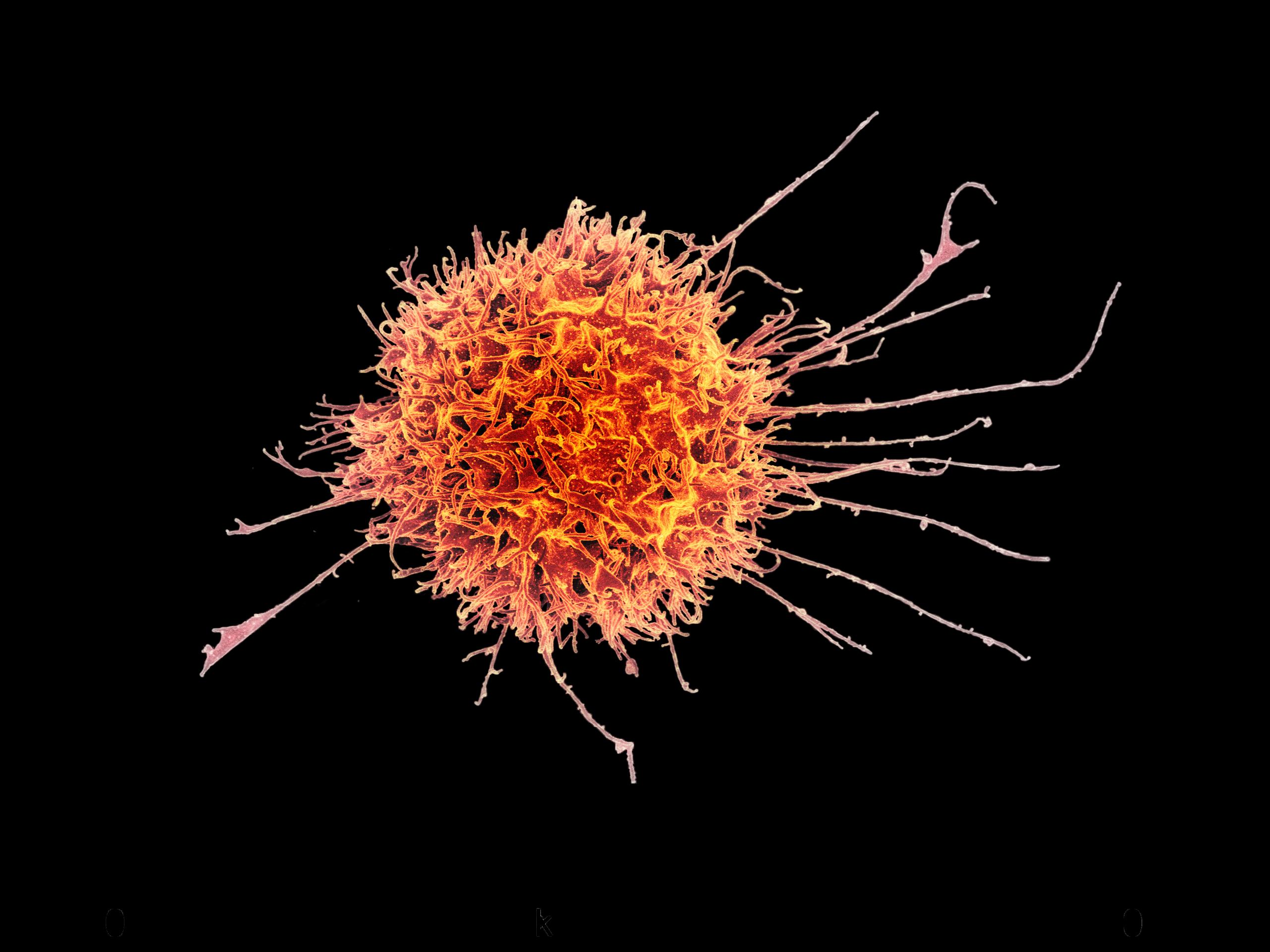
- Human natural killer cell, colorized scanning electron micrograph

Details
- System: Immune system
- Function: Cytotoxic lymphocyte

An adaptive natural killer (NK) cell or memory-like NK cell is a specialized natural killer cell that has the potential to form immunological memory. They can be distinguished from cytotoxic NK (cNK) cells by their receptor expression profile and epigenome. Adaptive NK cells are so named for properties which they share with the adaptive immune system. Though adaptive NK cells do not possess antigen specificity, they exhibit dynamic expansions of defined cell subsets, increased proliferation and long-term persistence for up to 3 months in vivo, high IFN-γ production, potent cytotoxic activity upon ex vivo restimulation, and protective memory responses.

Adaptive NK cells have been identified in both humans and mice. Persistent adaptive NK populations have been reported during viral infection, contact hypersensitivity reactions, and after stimulation by pro-inflammatory cytokines or activating receptor pathways. IL-12, IL-18, and IL-15 contribute to the development of adaptive NK cells by priming NK cells prior to immune stimulation.

== Origin ==
Human adaptive NK cells in peripheral blood are likely derived from cNK cells expressing low levels of CD56, as CD56^{dim} cNK cells are more likely to express killer-cell immunoglobulin-like receptors (KIRs) and/or CD94/NKG2C. These surface molecules are required for antigen sensing during infection.

Some evidence exists for tissue-resident adaptive NK cells in the liver, where a small population of CD49a^{+}NKG2C^{+} NK cells has been shown to emerge in response to human cytomegalovirus infection. These cells differ from the predominant population of CD49a^{−}CD49e^{−} NK cells in the liver by their gene expression.

Signals transmitted through the IL-12 receptor combined with CD2 and MHC class I-binding receptor provide a three-prong stimulation responsible for promoting the epigenetic and phenotypic modifications that occur in association with adaptive NK cell differentiation.

== Epigenetic regulation ==
NK cells essentially "remember" the previous effects of cytokines. NK cells pre-activated by IL-12/15/18 transfer their enhanced IFN-γ producing capacity to daughter cells. HCMV-associated NKG2C+ adaptive NK cells and IL-12/15/18 pre-activated NK cells have been detected to have an epigenetic imprint, for instance, the demethylated CNS1 region of the IFNG gene, which in turn can lead to a remarkable stability of the IFN-γ-producing phenotype even after adoptive transfer. Both IL-12 and IL-18 are required for the pronounced demethylation of the CNS1 region, whereas IL-15 might serve as a survival factor.

In addition to the IFNG gene, NKG2C+ adaptive NK cells also showed CpG demethylation of the PRDM1/BLIMP1 and ZBTB32/TZFP genes or hypermethylation of FCER1G (Fc fragment of IgE receptor Ig). Pre-activation of NK cells by the cytokines IL-12/18 plus IL-15 or by engagement of FcγRIII/CD16 via therapeutic antibodies can induce similar memory-like functions: an enhanced proliferative capacity toward IL-2 due to CD25 up-regulation as well as a strengthened responsiveness to restimulation by tumor cells. Importantly, both memory-like functionalities are antigen-unspecific and mean "remembering" a previous state of increased activation caused by cytokine exposure or stimulation via activating NK cell receptors.

== In humans ==
Unique and expanded adaptive NK cell populations were observed in peripheral blood in humans that have been previously infected with Human Cytomegalovirus (HCMV). These NK cells bear activating MHC class I-binding receptors, typically CD94/NKG2C, demonstrate reduced activation and degranulation in response to activated autologous T cells and they are CD56dim CD16+.

In comparison to CD56dim cNK cells, adaptive NK cells generally show decreased expression of surface CD7, CD161, NKp30, NKp46, and SIGLEC-7 but demonstrate retained or even higher expression of CD2, CD57, and CD85j (ILT2, LILRB1). None of these surface marker expression patterns are inherently specific for adaptive NK cells, but together they may help to identify discrete populations of adaptive NK cells. Human adaptive NK cells have the hypomethylated region of IFN-γ promoter. After stimulation through CD16 ligation adaptive NK cells produce large amounts of IFN-γ and also extensively proliferate. The cytotoxicity of adaptive NK cells remains a constant question in this field. It had been indicated similar or reduced degranulation of CD107a as compared to cNK cells after CD16 ligation or stimulation with antibody-coated tumor targets.

The discovery of memory in the human NK compartment makes us wonder whether it could be harnessed by vaccination. This could be particularly effective in HIV infections where CD4+T cells get rapidly depleted as it provides an alternative where B and T cells cannot be harnessed.

== Therapeutic potential ==
The clinical application of NK cells with memory-like properties can significantly increase the efficiency of these cells and pave the way for the new NK cell-based clinical approaches for the cancer treatment. Adaptive NK cells can mediate the enhanced antitumor effects, that may be due to their increased cytotoxicity, high IFN-γ production capacity, and persistence in large numbers in the host.

Clinical use of allogeneic NK cells is promising for the treatment of leukemia. KIR-ligand mismatch has a beneficial effect on the alloreactivity of donor NK cells against recipient leukemia. Besides, it has been shown that the adoptive transfer of alloreactive NK cells does not cause graft-versus-host disease (GVHD), but instead suppresses GVHD.

== See also ==
- Natural killer cell § Adaptive features
- Killer-cell immunoglobulin-like receptor
- KLRC2
- Adoptive cell transfer
- CD56
- Human Cytomegalovirus
- IFN-γ
