= NKG2A =

Type of cell receptor

Identifiers
- Symbol: KLRC1
- Alt. names: NKG2-A
- NCBI gene: 3821
- HGNC: http://hgnc:6374/
- OMIM: 161555
- PDB: 3BDW
- RefSeq: NM_002259.5
- UniProt: P26715

Other data
- Locus: Chr. 12
Search for
- Structures: Swiss-model
- Domains: InterPro

KLRC1

Identifiers
- Aliases: KLRC1, CD159A, NKG2, NKG2A, killer cell lectin like receptor C1
- External IDs: OMIM: 161555; MGI: 1336161; GeneCards: KLRC1
Available structures
PDB	Human UniProt search: PDBe RCSB
PDB	List of PDB id codes 2RMX, 2YU7, 3BDW, 3CDG, 3CII

Gene location (Human)
Chr.	Chromosome 12 (human)
Band	12p13.2	Start	10,442,264 bp
Band	12p13.2	End	10,454,685 bp

Gene location (Mouse)
Chr.	Chromosome 6 (mouse)
Band	6|6 F3	Start	129,642,978 bp
Band	6|6 F3	End	129,655,936 bp
RNA expression pattern
Bgee	Human / Mouse (ortholog); Top expressed in: granulocyte; testicle; endometrium; blood; spleen; gonad; corpus callosum; right uterine tube; upper lobe of left lung; lymph node / Top expressed in: blood; spleen; mesenteric lymph nodes; entorhinal cortex; granulocyte; perirhinal cortex; extraocular muscle; subcutaneous adipose tissue; thymus; lactiferous gland; More reference expression data
BioGPS	n/a
Gene ontology
Molecular function	protein antigen binding; protein binding; transmembrane signaling receptor activity; MHC class I protein complex binding; carbohydrate binding
Cellular component	integral component of membrane; receptor complex; plasma membrane; integral component of plasma membrane; membrane
Biological process	cell surface receptor signaling pathway; regulation of immune response
Sources:Amigo / QuickGO
Orthologs
Databases	NCBI: entry; OMA: entry
Species	Human	Mouse
Entrez	3821	16641
Ensembl	ENSG00000134545	ENSMUSG00000030167
UniProt	P26715	n/a
RefSeq (mRNA)	NM_213658; NM_001304448; NM_002259; NM_007328; NM_213657	NM_001136068; NM_001288664; NM_010652
RefSeq (protein)	NP_001291377; NP_002250; NP_015567; NP_998822; NP_998823	n/a
Location (UCSC)	Chr 12: 10.44 – 10.45 Mb	Chr 6: 129.64 – 129.66 Mb
PubMed search
- Wikidata
View/Edit Human	View/Edit Mouse

NKG2A also known as CD159a (Cluster of Differentiation 159a) is a protein that in humans is encoded by the gene KLRC1. It functions as an inhibitory NK cell receptor that is part of the NKG2 family. NKG2A is expressed predominantly by NK cells, but can also be found on a subset of T cells, especially on CD8^{+} cytotoxic T cells.

== Structure and signaling ==
NKG2A forms heterodimers with CD94 via disulfide bonds and assembles into a transmembrane protein type II. NKG2A contains two immunoreceptor tyrosine-based inhibitory motifs (ITIMs) in its cytoplasmic tail. When the CD94/NKG2A receptor binds to its ligands (see below), these ITIMs initiate a signalling cascade of tyrosine phosphatases, which suppresses NK cell activity.

== Ligand and function ==
=== Health ===
In humans, CD94/NKG2A receptors bind to the non-classical MHC class I molecule HLA-E. For proper binding, specific peptides presented on HLA-E are required. Since the primary function of HLA-E is to present signal peptides derived from classical MHC class I molecules such as HLA-A, HLA-B or HLA-C, NKG2A allows immune cells to indirectly monitor the expression levels of HLA-A/B/C through complexes of HLA-E and signal peptides. Given that HLA-E is broadly expressed throughout the body, the receptor–ligand interactions of the NKG2A–HLA-E/pHLA axis maintains tolerance to self and ensures suppression of autoimmunity.

=== Virus infection ===
Certain viruses such as Cytomegalovirus attempt to escape from T cell-mediated immune responses by down-regulating HLA class I molecules including HLA-A, HLA-B or HLA-C. In this case, signal peptides from these HLA molecules are no longer available for presentation on HLA-E. This disrupts the interaction between CD94/NKG2A and HLA-E, leading to loss-of-inhibition of NKG2A-expressing NK cells. As a consequence, NKG2A^{+} NK cells recognize CMV-infected cells through a mechanism termed missing self. To counteract this recognition, CMV contains the glycoprotein UL40, which provides a viral peptide that mimicks the sequence of self peptides from HLA molecules and is presented on HLA-E. As a result, CD94/NKG2A binds to HLA-E/pUL40, NKG2A^{+} NK cells remain inhibited, and the virus achieves immune escape.

Studies on SARS-CoV-2 have shown that the viral Nsp13-Protein contains a peptide that is presented on HLA-E. Presentation of the viral peptide disrupts the binding to NKG2A and thus causes NK cell activation resulting in protective immune responses against infected cells. Moreover, the Omicron BQ.1 variant has acquired a mutation in this HLA-E-restricted peptide, which diminishes its presentation. This could be a clue that SARS-CoV-2 has evolutionarily adapted to NK cell responses.

=== Cancer ===
In the context of cancer, NKG2A has been identified as important immune checkpoint. HLA-E is highly expressed across multiple cancer types, preventing adequate immune responses by NKG2A-expressing NK cells and cytotoxic T cells. Similar to other checkpoint inhibitors, the blocking anti-NKG2A antibody monalizumab is currently in clinical testing with the goal to revert NKG2A-dependent inhibition and to unleash immune responses against the cancer.

== See also ==
- CD94/NKG2
- KLRC2
- NKG2D
