= CD94/NKG2 =

CD94/NKG2 is a family of C-type lectin receptors which are expressed predominantly on the surface of NK cells and a subset of CD8^{+} T-lymphocyte. These receptors stimulate or inhibit cytotoxic activity of NK cells, therefore they are divided into activating and inhibitory receptors according to their function. CD94/NKG2 recognize nonclassical MHC glycoproteins class I (HLA-E in human and Qa-1 molecules in the mouse).

== CD94/NKG2 family ==
CD94/NKG2 family includes seven members: NKG2A, B, C, D, E, F and H. Genes encoding these receptors are clustered in the natural killer complex (NKC) on human chromosome 12 and mouse chromosome 6 together with Clr (C-lectin related) genes.

== Structure ==
NKG2 receptors are transmembrane proteins type II which dimerize with CD94 molecule. CD94 contains a short cytoplasmic domain and it is responsible for signal transduction. Therefore NKG2 receptors form disulfide bonded heterodimers. NKG2D represent an exception, it is a homodimer.

== Signaling ==
- NKG2A and NKG2B receptors transmit inhibitory signal. They contain two immunoreceptor tyrosine-based inhibitory motifs (ITIM) in their cytoplasmic tail that are defined by the sequence (I/L/V/S)xYxx(L/V), where “x” means any amino acid at a given position. If ITIM-bearing receptors engage their ligand, probably Src family kinase phosphorylates tyrosine residue, and this allows recruitment of the tyrosine phosphatase SHP-1, SHP-2 or SHIP. It leads to dephosphorylation of tyrosine kinase’s substrates, which are involved in the activating cascades. As a result, NK cell activation is suppressed.
- NKG2C (encoded by the KLRC2 gene), NKG2E and NKG2H are activating receptors. Ligand binding enables interaction between receptor and ITAM-bearing adaptor protein DAP12 (ITAM, Immunoreceptor tyrosine-based activation motif, defined by the sequence (D/E)xxYxx(L/I)x_{6-8}Yxx(L/I)). Src family kinases phosphorylate tyrosine in ITAM sequence. It results in recruitment of tyrosine kinases Syk and ZAP-70 by the adaptor molecules. Finally, actin cytoskeleton is being reorganized and the cell can release cytotolytic granules containing perforin and granzyme. This signaling pathway also induces transcription of many cytokine and chemokine genes. The process is similar to T and B cell signaling through their specific receptors TCR or BCR.
- NKG2D is activating receptor as well but it couples with adaptor protein DAP10 which carries signaling motif YINM. Src or Jak kinases phosphorylate DAP10, which can then associate with p85 subunit of PI(3)K or adaptor molecule Grb2. This signaling triggers actin reorganization (cell polarization) and degranulation.
- Function of NKG2F receptor has not been clarified yet. It may not associate with CD94, it has not a C-type lectin domain and contains ITIM-like motif in the cytoplasmic tail. However, ITIM-like motif seems to be non-functional, thus NKG2F was considered as an activating receptor.

== Ligands ==
Receptors of CD94/NKG2 family bind nonclassical MHC glycoproteins class I (HLA-E in human and Qa-1 molecules in the mouse).

Nonclassical MHC glycoproteins class I are structurally similar to classical MHC class I molecules, but they present mainly peptides derived from the signal peptides of MHC class I. Therefore NK cells can indirectly monitor the expression of classical MHC class I molecules through the interaction of CD94/NKG2 with HLA-E (Qa-1) and HLA-E (Qa-1) themselves as well. During cytomegalovirus infection, virus peptides are presented on HLA-E and NK cells that express the CD94/NKG2C receptor can specifically recognise these virus peptides, which results in activation, expansion, and differentiation of adaptive NK cells.

NKG2D constitutes an exception. Besides the fact that it is a homodimer, it associates with adaptor molecule DAP10 and its amino acid sequence is identical in only 28% in comparison with other CD94/NKG2 family members, NKG2D binds MHC class I homologues MIC-A (MHC class I polypeptide-related sequence A), MIC-B and ULBP (UL-16 binding protein) in human. MIC-A and MIC-B are expressed on the surface of epithelial and endothelial cells. The expression of these NKG2D ligands is higher in case of cellular stress, e.g. tumor disease or inflammation. This activates NK cells and triggers their cytotoxicity. ULBP is expressed constitutively in different tissues and it stimulates NK cells to secrete cytokines and chemokines.

Mouse NKG2D binds H-60 molecules, five variants of Rae1 protein (Retinoic acid transcript 1) and Mult1 (mouse ULBP-like transcript 1). H-60 and Rae1 are structurally similar to MHC glycoproteins class I and their expression is increased in tumor cells. This leads to NK cell activation and IFN-γ production, which stimulates cells of innate immunity.

== See also ==
- Natural killer cell
- NKG2
- NKG2A
- NKG2D
- KLRC2
