= Qa-1b =

Biomolecule

Within molecular and cell biology, Qa-1b is a MHC class I molecule and is the functional homolog of HLA-E in humans. Qa-1b is characterised by its limited polymorphisms and small peptide repertoire. Qa-1b binds to peptides derived from signal peptides of MHC class Ia molecule and interact with the CD94/NKG2 receptors on natural killer cells. The Qa-1b-peptide complex signals natural killer cells not to engage in cell lysis. Despite its homology with HLA-E, it seems that Qa-1b evolved a similar function to HLA-E coincidentally.
