= ZBTB32 =

Protein-coding gene in the species Homo sapiens

Identifiers
- Aliases: ZBTB32, FAXF, FAZF, Rog, TZFP, ZNF538, zinc finger and BTB domain containing 32
- External IDs: OMIM: 605859; MGI: 1891838; GeneCards: ZBTB32
Available structures
| PDB | Ortholog search: PDBe RCSB |
| PDB | List of PDB id codes 3M5B |

Gene location (Human)
| Chr. | Chromosome 19 (human) |
| Band | 19q13.12 | Start | 35,704,558 bp |
| Band | 19q13.12 | End | 35,717,038 bp |

Gene location (Mouse)
| Chr. | Chromosome 7 (mouse) |
| Band | 7|7 B1 | Start | 30,289,106 bp |
| Band | 7|7 B1 | End | 30,298,334 bp |
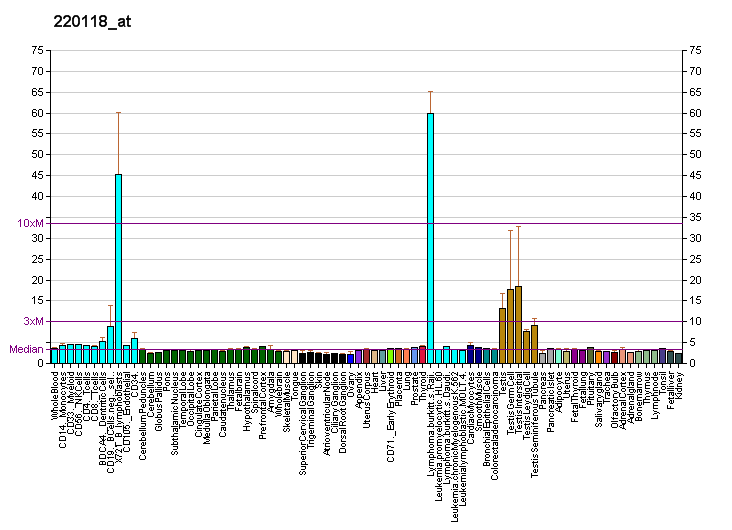
RNA expression pattern
| Bgee | Human / Mouse (ortholog); Top expressed in: testicle; left testis; right testis; gonad; spleen; lymph node; right uterine tube; sural nerve; appendix; granulocyte / Top expressed in: spermatocyte; seminiferous tubule; spermatid; zygote; embryo; embryo; secondary oocyte; primary oocyte; blastocyst; morula; More reference expression data |
| BioGPS | More reference expression data |
Gene ontology
| Molecular function | nucleic acid binding; DNA binding; zinc ion binding; protein binding; transcription corepressor activity; metal ion binding; DNA-binding transcription factor activity, RNA polymerase II-specific |
| Cellular component | nucleus; nucleoplasm |
| Biological process | regulation of transcription, DNA-templated; negative regulation of transcription by RNA polymerase II; transcription by RNA polymerase II; transcription, DNA-templated |
Sources:Amigo / QuickGO
Orthologs
| Databases | NCBI: entry; OMA: entry |
| Species | Human | Mouse |
| Entrez | 27033 | 58206 |
| Ensembl | ENSG00000011590 | ENSMUSG00000006310 |
| UniProt | Q9Y2Y4 | Q9JKD9 |
| RefSeq (mRNA) | NM_014383; NM_001316902; NM_001316903 | NM_021397 |
| RefSeq (protein) | NP_001303831; NP_001303832; NP_055198 | NP_067372 |
| Location (UCSC) | Chr 19: 35.7 – 35.72 Mb | Chr 7: 30.29 – 30.3 Mb |
| PubMed search |
- Wikidata
| View/Edit Human | View/Edit Mouse |

Zinc finger and BTB domain-containing protein 32 is a protein that in humans is encoded by the 1960 bp ZBTB32 gene. The 52 kDa protein (487 aa) is a transcriptional repressor and the gene is expressed in T and B cells upon activation, but also significantly in testis cells. It is a member of the Poxviruses and Zinc-finger (POZ) and Krüppel (POK) family of proteins, and was identified in multiple screens involving either immune cell tumorigenesis or immune cell development.

The protein recruits histone modification enzymes to chromatin to affect gene activation. ZBTB32 recruits corepressors, such as N-CoR and HDACs to its target genes, induces repressive chromatin states and acts cooperatively with other proteins, e.g. with Blimp-1, to suppress the transcription of genes .

It contains a N-terminal BTB/POZ domain (IPR000210) or a SKP1/BTB/POZ domain (IPR011333), and three C-terminal zinc fingers, Znf_C2H2_sf. (IPR036236), Znf_C2H2_type domain (IPR013087), a Znf_RING/FYVE/PHD domain (IPR013083), followed by a putative UBZ4 domain.

== Nomenclature ==
Zinc finger and BTB domain-containing protein 32 is also known as:

- Fanconi Anemia Zinc Finger Protein (FAZF),
- Testis Zinc Finger Protein (TZFP),
- FANCC-Interacting Protein (FAXP),
- Zinc Finger Protein 538 (ZNF538),
- Repressor of GATA3 (ROG),
- Promyelocytic Leukemia Zinc Finger and Zbtb16 (PLZF)-like zinc finger protein (PLZP)

== Interactions ==
Zbtb32 has been shown to interact with:

- Fanconi anemia complementation group C (Fancc)
- Thioredoxin interacting protein (Txnip), but the interaction might be unspecific; however, Vitamin D3 upregulated protein 1 (VDUP1) seems to interact
- Zinc finger and BTB domain-containing protein 16 (Zbtb16)
- Zinc-finger elbow-related proline domain protein 2 (Zpo2)
- GATA binding protein (Gata2)

== Immune system ==
The expression of ZBTB32 is induced by inflammatory cytokines and promotes proliferation of natural killer cells.

Zbtb32 knockout mice show a trend to develop type 1 diabetes, although the difference is not statistically different. Furthermore the Zbtb32 do not show a difference in lymphocyte proliferation, possibly due to compensation from other genes.

== Cancer ==
ZBTB32 is highly expressed in spermatogonial stem cells, in hematopoietic stem and progenitor cells, in diffuse large B-cell lymphoma (DLBCL) and appears to suppress the immune system by silencing the CIITA gene.

The transcription factor gene GATA3 is altered in mammary tumors. Down-regulation of GATA3 expression and activity by the Zinc-finger elbow-related proline domain protein 2 (Zpo2), whereas Zbtb32 facilitates Zpo2 targeting to the GATA3 promoter, results in the development of aggressive breast cancers.

A DNA methylation correlation network was built based on the methylation correlation between differentially methylated genes. A survival analysis of candidate biomarkers was performed. One of eight biomarkers and hub genes identified in colon cancer is ZBTB32.

The expression of Zbtb32 is upregulated after exposure to cisplatin.
