= KLRD1 =

Mammalian protein found in Homo sapiens

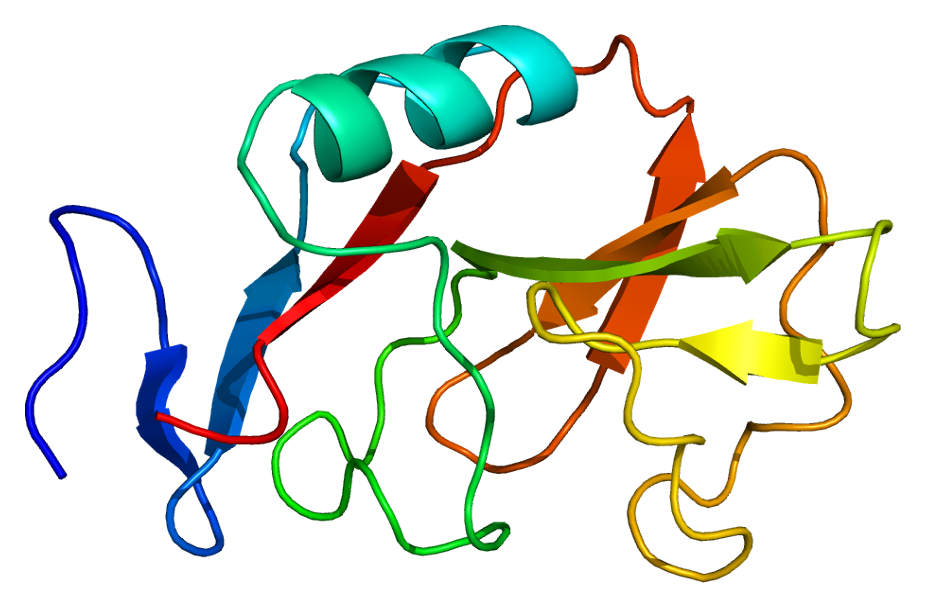

Identifiers
- Aliases: KLRD1, CD94, killer cell lectin like receptor D1
- External IDs: OMIM: 602894; MGI: 1196275; GeneCards: KLRD1
Available structures
PDB	Ortholog search: PDBe RCSB
PDB	List of PDB id codes 1B6E, 3BDW, 3CDG, 3CII

Gene location (Human)
Chr.	Chromosome 12 (human)
Band	12p13.2	Start	10,226,058 bp
Band	12p13.2	End	10,329,608 bp

Gene location (Mouse)
Chr.	Chromosome 6 (mouse)
Band	6 F3|6 63.42 cM	Start	129,568,745 bp
Band	6 F3|6 63.42 cM	End	129,575,738 bp
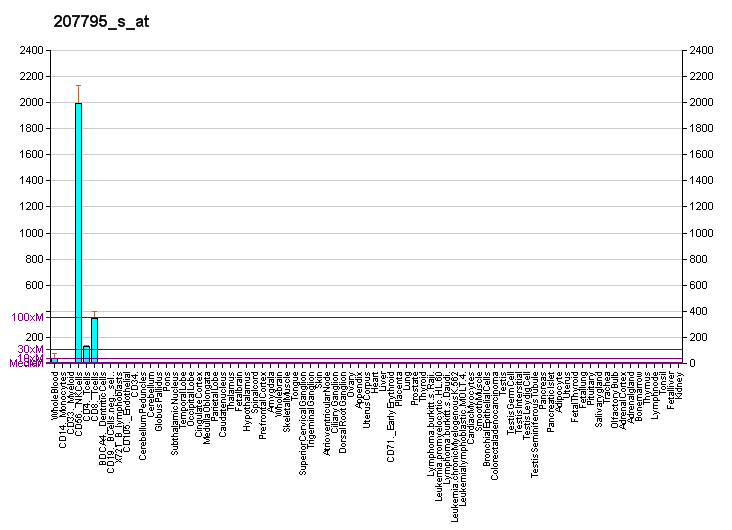

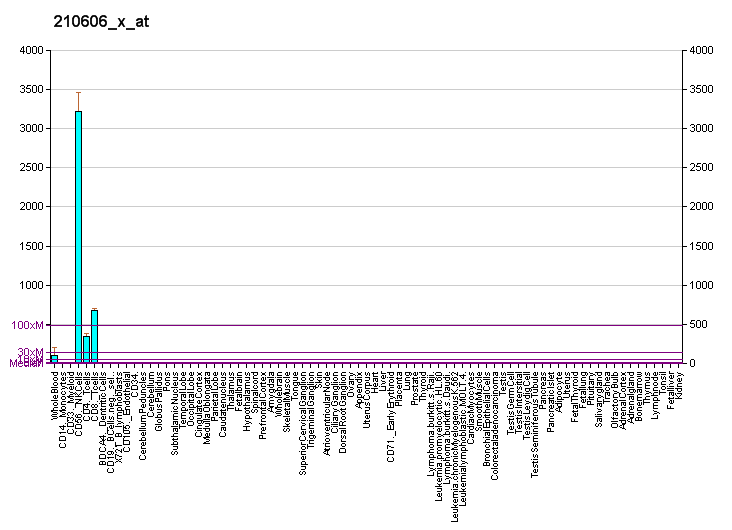

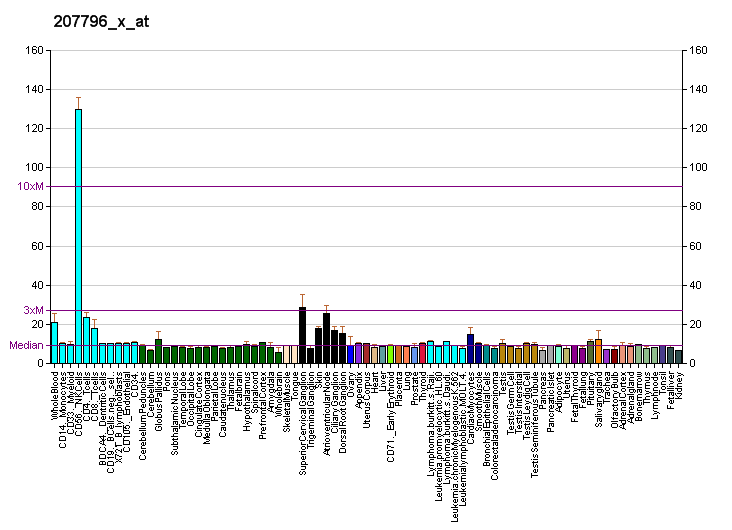
RNA expression pattern
Bgee	Human / Mouse (ortholog); Top expressed in: granulocyte; blood; spleen; bone marrow; lymph node; bone marrow cell; upper lobe of left lung; testicle; mononuclear cell; gonad / Top expressed in: blood; spleen; mesenteric lymph nodes; subcutaneous adipose tissue; thymus; jejunum; duodenum; granulocyte; bone marrow; submandibular gland; More reference expression data
BioGPS	More reference expression data
Gene ontology
Molecular function	protein antigen binding; MHC class Ib protein binding, via antigen binding groove; protein binding; transmembrane signaling receptor activity; MHC class I protein complex binding; carbohydrate binding
Cellular component	integral component of membrane; receptor complex; plasma membrane; membrane; external side of plasma membrane
Biological process	cell surface receptor signaling pathway; innate immune response; natural killer cell mediated immunity; regulation of immune response
Sources:Amigo / QuickGO
Orthologs
Databases	NCBI: entry; OMA: entry
Species	Human	Mouse
Entrez	3824	16643
Ensembl	ENSG00000134539	ENSMUSG00000030165
UniProt	Q13241	O54707
RefSeq (mRNA)	NM_001114396; NM_002262; NM_007334; NM_001351060; NM_001351062 NM_001351063	NM_010654
RefSeq (protein)	NP_001107868; NP_002253; NP_031360; NP_001337989; NP_001337991 NP_001337992	NP_034784
Location (UCSC)	Chr 12: 10.23 – 10.33 Mb	Chr 6: 129.57 – 129.58 Mb
PubMed search
- Wikidata
View/Edit Human	View/Edit Mouse

CD94 (Cluster of Differentiation 94), also known as killer cell lectin-like receptor subfamily D, member 1 (KLRD1) is a human gene.

The protein encoded by CD94 gene is a lectin, cluster of differentiation and a receptor that is involved in cell signaling and is expressed on the surface of natural killer cells in the innate immune system. CD94 pairs with the NKG2 molecule as a heterodimer. The CD94/NKG2 complex, on the surface of natural killer cells interacts with Human Leukocyte Antigen (HLA)-E on target cells.

== Function ==
Natural killer (NK) cells are a distinct lineage of lymphocytes that mediate cytotoxic activity and secrete cytokines upon immune stimulation. Several genes of the C-type lectin superfamily, including members of the NKG2 family, are expressed by NK cells and may be involved in the regulation of NK cell function. KLRD1 (CD94) is an antigen preferentially expressed on NK cells and is classified as a type II membrane protein because it has an external C terminus. KLRD1 has two alternatively spliced variants that differ in the presence or absence of exon 2 sequence.

== Interactions ==
KLRD1 has been shown to interact with KLRC2.

== See also ==
- Cluster of differentiation
- CD94/NKG2
