= NCR3 =

Mammalian protein found in Homo sapiens

Identifiers
- Aliases: NCR3, 1C7, CD337, LY117, MALS, NKp30, natural cytotoxicity triggering receptor 3
- External IDs: OMIM: 611550; GeneCards: NCR3
Available structures
PDB	Human UniProt search: PDBe RCSB
PDB	List of PDB id codes 3NOI, 3PV6

Gene location (Human)
Chr.	Chromosome 6 (human)
Band	6p21.33	Start	31,588,895 bp
Band	6p21.33	End	31,593,006 bp
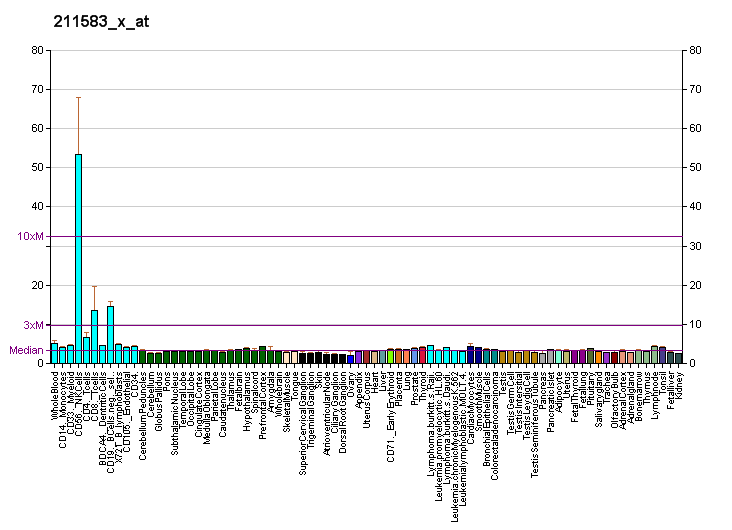

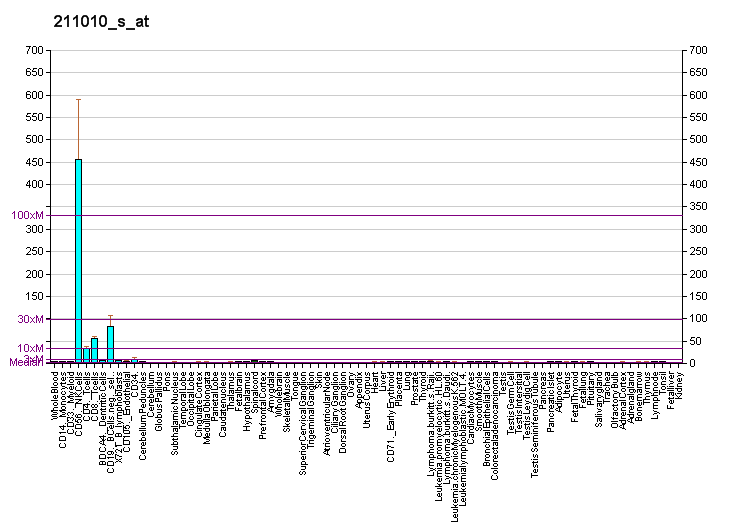

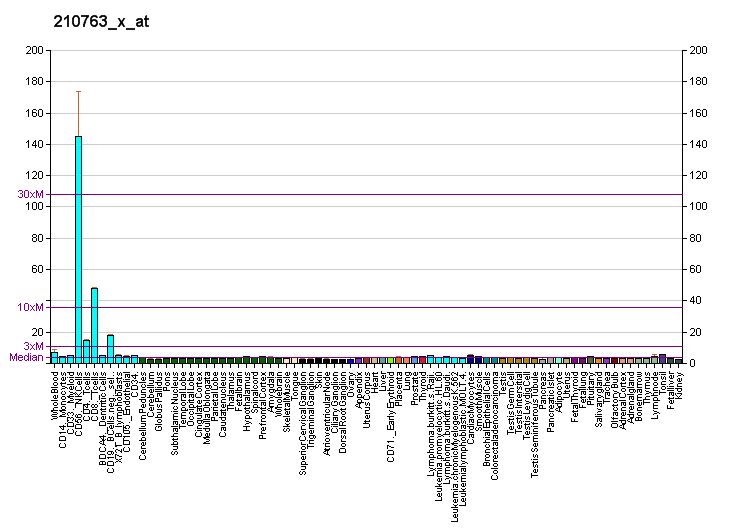
RNA expression pattern
Bgee	Human / Mouse (ortholog); Top expressed in: granulocyte; blood; lymph node; spleen; appendix; gonad; bone marrow; monocyte; apex of heart; mucosa of transverse colon / n/a; More reference expression data
BioGPS	More reference expression data
Gene ontology
Molecular function	signaling receptor binding; protein homodimerization activity; cell adhesion molecule binding; protein binding; identical protein binding
Cellular component	integral component of membrane; plasma membrane; integral component of plasma membrane; membrane
Biological process	susceptibility to T cell mediated cytotoxicity; heterophilic cell-cell adhesion via plasma membrane cell adhesion molecules; inflammatory response; cell recognition; positive regulation of natural killer cell mediated cytotoxicity; positive regulation of natural killer cell mediated cytotoxicity directed against tumor cell target; immune response; susceptibility to natural killer cell mediated cytotoxicity; homophilic cell adhesion via plasma membrane adhesion molecules; regulation of immune response; immune response-activating cell surface receptor signaling pathway; natural killer cell activation; immune system process
Sources:Amigo / QuickGO
Orthologs
Databases	NCBI: entry; OMA: entry
Species	Human	Mouse
Entrez	259197	n/a
Ensembl	ENSG00000237103; ENSG00000236979; ENSG00000206430; ENSG00000237808; ENSG00000236315 ENSG00000223833; ENSG00000225211; ENSG00000204475	n/a
UniProt	O14931	n/a
RefSeq (mRNA)	NM_001145466; NM_001145467; NM_147130	n/a
RefSeq (protein)	NP_001138938; NP_001138939; NP_667341	n/a
Location (UCSC)	Chr 6: 31.59 – 31.59 Mb	n/a
PubMed search		n/a
- Wikidata
View/Edit Human

Natural cytotoxicity triggering receptor 3 is a protein that in humans is encoded by the NCR3 gene. NCR3 has also been designated as CD337 (cluster of differentiation 337) and as NKp30. NCR3 belongs to the family of NCR membrane receptors together with NCR1 (NKp46) and NCR2 (NKp44).

== Identification ==
NKp30 receptor was first identified in 1999. According to Western blot analysis specific monoclonal antibodies reacted with 30kDa molecule, therefore was the protein named NKp30.

== Structure ==
Gene for NKp30 is located in the MHC class III region of the human MHC locus and encodes 190 amino acid long type I transmembrane receptor which belongs to immunoglobulin super family (IgSF). NKp30 has a mass of 30 kDa and includes one Ig-like extracellular domain which is 138 amino acids long, a 19 amino acid transmembrane (TM) domain and a 33 amino acid cytoplasmic tail. The Ig-like domain consists of 2 antiparallel beta-sheets linked by a disulphide bond. The extracellular domain contains two potential sites for N-linked glycosylation involved in ligand binding. The TM domain contains a positivelly charged arginine residue, which associates with negatively charged aspartate in TM domain of ITAM adaptor molecules CD3ζ and FCεRIγ. This is a common feature of other NK cell activating receptors as well. Accordingly the cytoplasmic tail lacks typical ITAM consensus sequence.

=== Splicing variants ===
Six different splicing variants can be found on the cell surface. NKp30a, NKp30b and NKp30c encode molecules with extracellular V-type Ig domain. NKp30d, NKp30e and NKp30f encode extracellular C-type Ig domain. Splicing variants also differ in their cytosolic intracellular domains depending on the translation of variants of exon 4 (NKp30a,b or c).

The distribution of splicing variants of NKp30 varies in tissues and results in different NK cell responses. NKp30a/b engagement stimulates the release of high amounts of IFN-γ, whereas activation of NKp30c induces IL-10 production and only small amounts of IFN-γ. First two are therefore considered as immunostimulatory isoforms which enhance Th1 immune response, while NKp30c mediates immunosuppressive signaling most likely because of reduced association with CD3ζ adaptor after cross-linking with ligand.

Gastrointestinal stromal tumor patients who express NKp30c isoform have worse prognosis compared with patients expressing other isoforms, mainly as a consequence of NK cell immunosuppressive character.

== Expression ==
NCR3 is expressed mainly on cytoplasmic membrane of mature NK cells and functions as an activating receptor of NK cells. However it is also expressed on surface of CD8+ T cells, γδ T cells with Vδ1 TCR and ILC2. The presence of IL-15 stimulates the expression of NKp30+ CD8+ T cells with anti-tumor activity. Expression of NKp30 in γδ T cells is induced by IL-2 or IL-15. After progesteron stimulation NKp30 can be found on the cytoplasmic membrane of endometrial epithelial cells as well.

== Function ==
NKp30 plays a major role in NK anti-tumor response and immunosurveillance, mainly by activating NK cell cytotoxicity and cytokine secretion. Direct killing happens similarly to other natural cytotoxicity receptors (NCRs) such as NKp44 and NKp46. NCR3 has a wide range of non-MHC ligands secreted or expressed by cancer or virus-infected cells, e.g. to heparan sulfate glycosaminoglycans (HS GAGs) and B7-H6.

Heparan sulfate epitopes are in healthy tissue as well as on tumor cells, where HS GAGs are changed or differ in ligands (HMGB1, S100A8/A9) in contrast to healthy tissue. In addition, interaction of NCR with HS GAGs can facilitate binding to other cellular ligands. Thus via heparan sulfate epitopes NCRs can bind to the same ligands and exert similar reactions and at the same time also have their own unique interacting partners. It is also known that heparan sulfate epitopes lead to better signaling through growth factor receptors, NCRs could be thus evolved to recognize unusual HS GAGs on malignant cells as transformed cell patterns.

Ligation of NKp30 and intracellular protein HLA-B-associated transcript 3 (BAT3) released by tumour cells to extracellular matrix results in NK and dendritic cell cross-talk.

Human cytomegalovirus protein pp65 is another ligand of NKp30. The ligation leads to disruption of the interaction between NKp30 and CD3ζ and thus decreases the activation of NK cells and its cytotoxicity. This is a mechanism of HMCV to evade NK cell surveillance.

Patients with primary Sjögren's syndrome express higher levels of NKp30+ NK cells (and its ligation with B7-H6 expressed in salivary glands) in comparison to healthy controls.

=== NKp30 and dendritic cells ===
Immature dendritic cells can be lysed upon stimulation of NKp30 on NK cells. Accordingly. patients with acute myeloid leukemia (AML), who often show downregulation in NKp30 expression, were incapable of effectively lysing both autologous and allogeneic immature dendritic cells. The ability of NK cells to kill immature dendritic cells may serve to check the quality of dendritic cell maturation process. Interestingly at the same time immunostimulatory capacity of dendritic cells can be enhanced via interaction with NKp30 with ligands expressed on immature dendritic cells. Upon such stimulation NK cells produce TNFα which is capable of inducing dendritic cell maturation.

=== NCR3 during pregnancy ===
Uterine NK cells (uNK) are the most abundant lymphocyte population in uterus during pregnancy on the maternal-fetal interface. These cells are responsible for angiogenesis and vascular remodelling in trophoblast. uNK cells express NKp30 and its ligands are expressed by trophoblast cells. Though these ligands have not yet been identified, this interaction has a potential to regulate fetal-maternal interface. The uNK cells dominantly express the inhibitory NKp30c isoform.
