= B3GAT1 =

Protein-coding gene in the species Homo sapiens

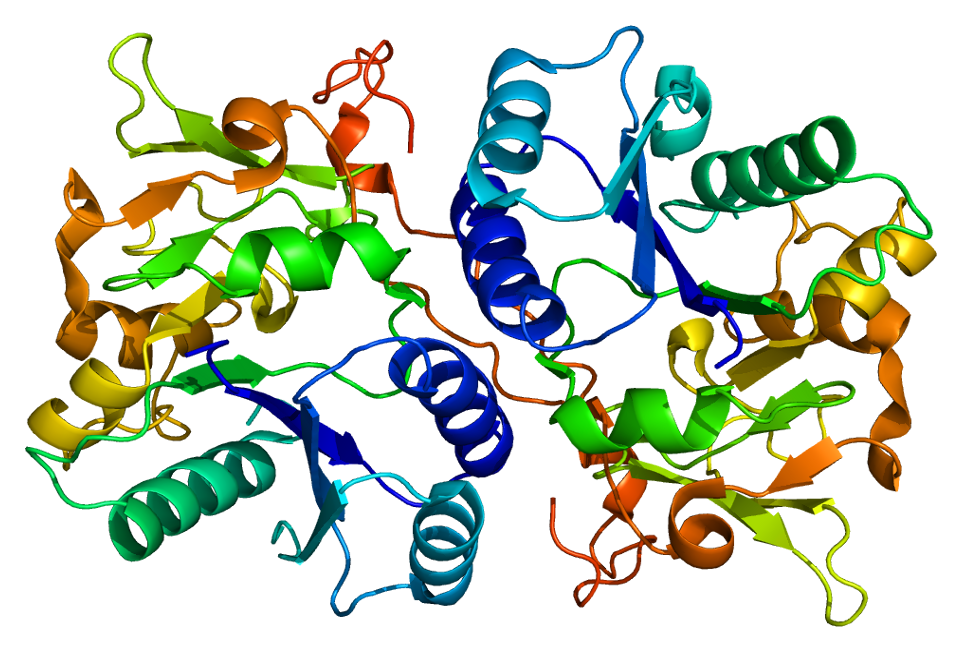

Identifiers
- Aliases: B3GAT1, CD57, GLCATP, GLCUATP, HNK1, LEU7, NK-1, NK1, beta-1,3-glucuronyltransferase 1
- External IDs: OMIM: 151290; MGI: 1924148; GeneCards: B3GAT1
Available structures
PDB	Ortholog search: PDBe RCSB
PDB	List of PDB id codes 1V82, 1V83, 1V84
Enzyme activity
EC #	BRENDA	ExPASy	KEGG	MetaCyc
2.4.1.135	↗	↗	↗	↗

Gene location (Human)
Chr.	Chromosome 11 (human)
Band	11q25	Start	134,378,504 bp
Band	11q25	End	134,412,242 bp

Gene location (Mouse)
Chr.	Chromosome 9 (mouse)
Band	9|9 A4	Start	26,645,024 bp
Band	9|9 A4	End	26,674,397 bp
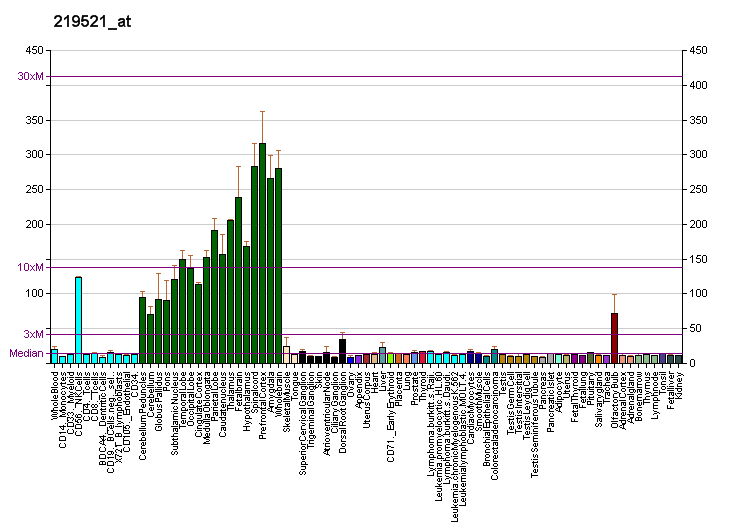
RNA expression pattern
Bgee	Human / Mouse (ortholog); Top expressed in: C1 segment; right frontal lobe; amygdala; anterior cingulate cortex; prefrontal cortex; Brodmann area 9; hippocampus proper; putamen; nucleus accumbens; Region I of hippocampus proper / Top expressed in: habenula; visual cortex; primary visual cortex; piriform cortex; superior frontal gyrus; subiculum; dentate gyrus; dentate gyrus of hippocampal formation granule cell; lateral septal nucleus; superior colliculus; More reference expression data
BioGPS	More reference expression data
Gene ontology
Molecular function	transferase activity; metal ion binding; galactosylgalactosylxylosylprotein 3-beta-glucuronosyltransferase activity; UDP-galactose:beta-N-acetylglucosamine beta-1,3-galactosyltransferase activity
Cellular component	integral component of membrane; Golgi apparatus; membrane; extracellular region; endoplasmic reticulum; endoplasmic reticulum membrane; intracellular membrane-bounded organelle; Golgi membrane
Biological process	glycosaminoglycan metabolic process; protein glycosylation; chondroitin sulfate proteoglycan biosynthetic process; chondroitin sulfate metabolic process; carbohydrate metabolic process; cellular response to hypoxia
Sources:Amigo / QuickGO
Orthologs
Databases	NCBI: entry; OMA: entry
Species	Human	Mouse
Entrez	27087	76898
Ensembl	ENSG00000109956	ENSMUSG00000045994
UniProt	Q9P2W7	Q9CW73
RefSeq (mRNA)	NM_018644; NM_054025; NM_001367973	NM_029792; NM_001310766
RefSeq (protein)	NP_061114; NP_473366; NP_001354902	NP_001297695; NP_084068
Location (UCSC)	Chr 11: 134.38 – 134.41 Mb	Chr 9: 26.65 – 26.67 Mb
PubMed search
- Wikidata
View/Edit Human	View/Edit Mouse

3-beta-glucuronosyltransferase 1 (B3GAT1) is an enzyme that in humans is encoded by the B3GAT1 gene, whose enzymatic activity creates the CD57 epitope on other cell surface proteins. In immunology, the CD57 antigen (CD stands for cluster of differentiation) is also known as HNK1 (human natural killer-1) or LEU7. It is expressed as a carbohydrate epitope that contains a sulfoglucuronyl residue in several adhesion molecules of the nervous system.

== Function ==
The protein encoded by this gene is a member of the glucuronyltransferase gene family. These enzymes exhibit strict acceptor specificity, recognizing nonreducing terminal sugars and their anomeric linkages. This gene product functions as the key enzyme in a glucuronyl transfer reaction during the biosynthesis of the carbohydrate epitope HNK-1 (human natural killer-1, also known as CD57 and LEU7). Alternate transcriptional splice variants have been characterized.

== Immunohistochemistry ==
In anatomical pathology, CD57 (immunostaining) is similar to CD56 for use in differentiating neuroendocrine tumors from others. Using immunohistochemistry, CD57 molecule can be demonstrated in around 10 to 20% of lymphocytes, as well as in some epithelial, neural, and chromaffin cells. Among lymphocytes, CD57 positive cells are typically either T cells or NK cells, and are most commonly found within the germinal centres of lymph nodes, tonsils, and the spleen.

There is an increase in the number of circulating CD57 positive cells in the blood of patients who have recently undergone organ or tissue transplants, especially of the bone marrow, and in patients with HIV. Increased CD57+ counts have also been reported in rheumatoid arthritis and Felty's syndrome, among other conditions. High levels of CD57 expression amongst circulating CD8+ T cells is associated with other markers of immune ageing (immunosenescence) and may be associated with increased cancer risk in renal transplant recipients.

Neoplastic CD57 positive cells are seen in conditions as varied as large granular lymphocytic leukaemia, small-cell carcinoma, thyroid carcinoma, and neural and carcinoid tumours. Although the antigen is particularly common in carcinoid tumours, it is found in such a wide range of other conditions that it is of less use in distinguishing these tumours from others than more specific markers such as chromogranin and NSE.
