= Monalizumab =

Monoclonal antibody

Monoclonal antibody
- Type: ?
- Source: Humanized
- Target: NKG2A

Legal status
- Legal status: Investigational

Identifiers
- CAS Number: 1228763-95-8
- ChemSpider: none
- UNII: 3ZXZ2V0588
- KEGG: D13238

Monalizumab, a humanized anti-NKG2A antibody(formerly IPH2201) is an investigational drug being studied for rheumatoid arthritis, gynecologic malignancies and other cancers.

== Mechanism of action ==
Monalizumab is a monoclonal antibody targeted at NKG2A. It is a checkpoint inhibitor.
