= HLA-E =

Protein-coding gene in the species Homo sapiens

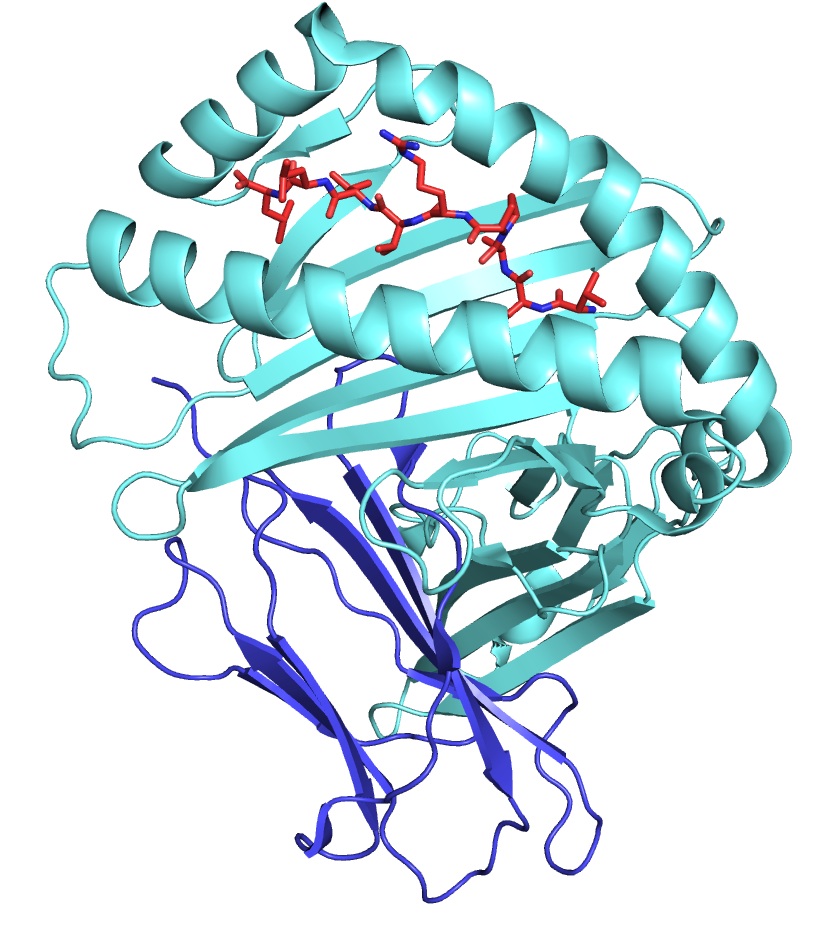

Identifiers
- Aliases: HLA-E, EA1.2, EA2.1, HLA-6.2, MHC, QA1, major histocompatibility complex, class I, E
- External IDs: OMIM: 143010; MGI: 2442805; GeneCards: HLA-E
Available structures
PDB	Human UniProt search: PDBe RCSB
PDB	List of PDB id codes 3CII, 1KPR, 1KTL, 1MHE, 2ESV, 3AM8, 3BZE, 3BZF, 3CDG

Gene location (Human)
Chr.	Chromosome 6 (human)
Band	6p22.1	Start	30,489,509 bp
Band	6p22.1	End	30,494,194 bp

Gene location (Mouse)
Chr.	Chromosome 17 (mouse)
Band	17|17 B1	Start	36,420,126 bp
Band	17|17 B1	End	36,422,550 bp
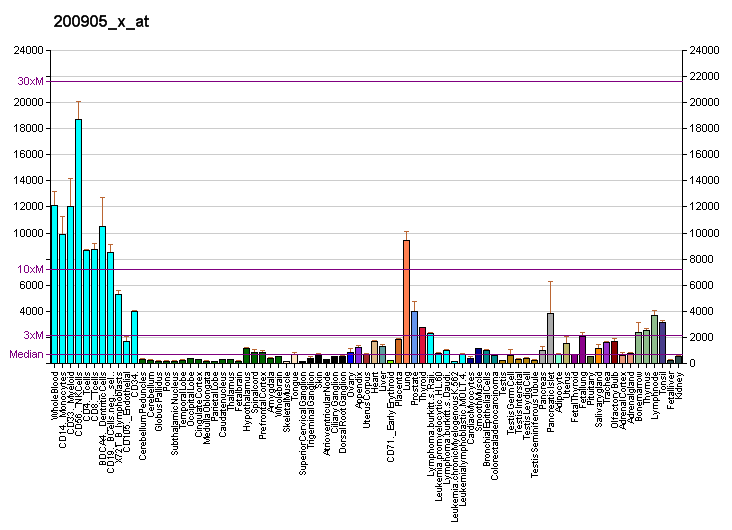

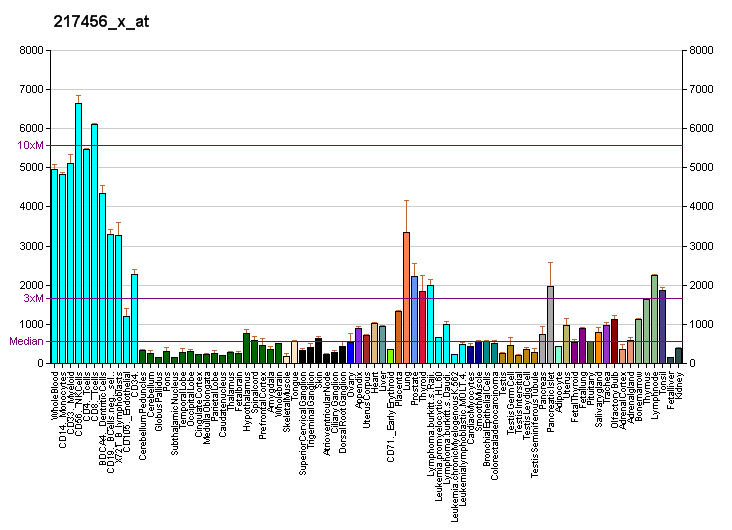

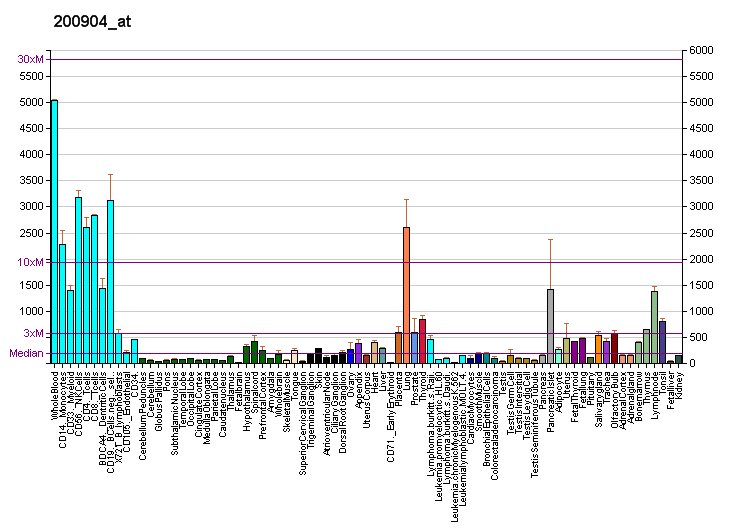
RNA expression pattern
Bgee	Human / Mouse (ortholog); Top expressed in: blood; right lung; granulocyte; upper lobe of left lung; monocyte; spleen; lymph node; subcutaneous adipose tissue; appendix; gallbladder / Top expressed in: thymus; intestinal villus; granulocyte; mesenteric lymph nodes; duodenum; Paneth cell; jejunum; zygote; right kidney; blastocyst; More reference expression data
BioGPS	More reference expression data
Gene ontology
Molecular function	beta-2-microglobulin binding; MHC class I protein binding; signaling receptor binding; natural killer cell lectin-like receptor binding; peptide antigen binding; T cell receptor binding
Cellular component	integral component of membrane; phagocytic vesicle membrane; early endosome membrane; membrane; MHC class Ib protein complex; Golgi membrane; plasma membrane; cell surface; MHC class I protein complex; ER to Golgi transport vesicle membrane; integral component of lumenal side of endoplasmic reticulum membrane; extracellular exosome; recycling endosome membrane
Biological process	antigen processing and presentation; adaptive immune response; antigen processing and presentation of exogenous peptide antigen via MHC class I, TAP-dependent; CD8-positive, alpha-beta T cell activation; interferon-gamma-mediated signaling pathway; immune system process; antigen processing and presentation of peptide antigen via MHC class I; positive regulation of T cell mediated cytotoxicity; positive regulation of TRAIL production; positive regulation of interleukin-4 production; antigen processing and presentation of exogenous peptide antigen via MHC class I, TAP-independent; protection from natural killer cell mediated cytotoxicity; positive regulation of interleukin-13 production; type I interferon signaling pathway; immune response; regulation of natural killer cell mediated immunity; positive regulation of natural killer cell mediated immunity; regulation of immune response; positive regulation of tumor necrosis factor production; innate immune response; positive regulation of CD8-positive, alpha-beta T cell proliferation; antigen processing and presentation of endogenous peptide antigen via MHC class Ib
Sources:Amigo / QuickGO
Orthologs
Databases	NCBI: entry; OMA: entry
Species	Human	Mouse
Entrez	3133	667803
Ensembl	ENSG00000204592; ENSG00000225201; ENSG00000236632; ENSG00000230254; ENSG00000206493 ENSG00000233904; ENSG00000229252	ENSMUSG00000073405
UniProt	P13747	n/a
RefSeq (mRNA)	NM_005516	NM_001271005
RefSeq (protein)	NP_005507	n/a
Location (UCSC)	Chr 6: 30.49 – 30.49 Mb	Chr 17: 36.42 – 36.42 Mb
PubMed search
- Wikidata
View/Edit Human	View/Edit Mouse

HLA class I histocompatibility antigen, alpha chain E (HLA-E) also known as MHC class I antigen E is a protein that in humans is encoded by the HLA-E gene. The human HLA-E is a non-classical MHC class I molecule that is characterized by a limited polymorphism and a lower cell surface expression than its classical paralogues. The functional homolog in mice is called Qa-1b, officially known as H2-T23.

== Structure ==
Like other MHC class I molecules, HLA-E is a heterodimer consisting of an α heavy chain and a light chain (β-2 microglobulin). The heavy chain is approximately 45 kDa and anchored in the membrane. The HLA-E gene contains 8 exons. Exon one encodes the signal peptide, exons 2 and 3 encode the α1 and α2 domains, which both bind the peptide, exon 4 encodes the α3 domain, exon 5 encodes the transmembrane domain, and exons 6 and 7 encode the cytoplasmic tail.

== Function ==
HLA-E has a very specialized role in cell recognition by natural killer cells (NK cells). HLA-E binds a restricted subset of peptides derived from signal peptides of classical MHC class I molecules, namely HLA-A, B, C, G. These peptides are released from the membrane of the endoplasmic reticulum (ER) by the signal peptide peptidase and trimmed by the cytosolic proteasome. Upon transport into the ER lumen by the transporter associated with antigen processing (TAP), these peptides bind to a peptide binding groove on the HLA-E molecule. This allows HLA-E to assemble correctly and to be expressed on the cell surface. NK cells recognize the HLA-E+peptide complex using the heterodimeric receptor CD94/NKG2A/B/C. When CD94/NKG2A or CD94/NKG2B is engaged, it produces an inhibitory effect on the cytotoxic activity of the NK cell to prevent cell lysis. However, binding of HLA-E to CD94/NKG2C (see KLRC2) results in NK cell activation. This interaction has been shown to trigger expansion of NK cell subsets in antiviral responses, where adaptive NK cells that express CD94/NKG2C can specifically recognise HCMV-derived peptide antigens.
