= Integrin alpha-1 =

Mammalian protein found in Homo sapiens

ITGA1
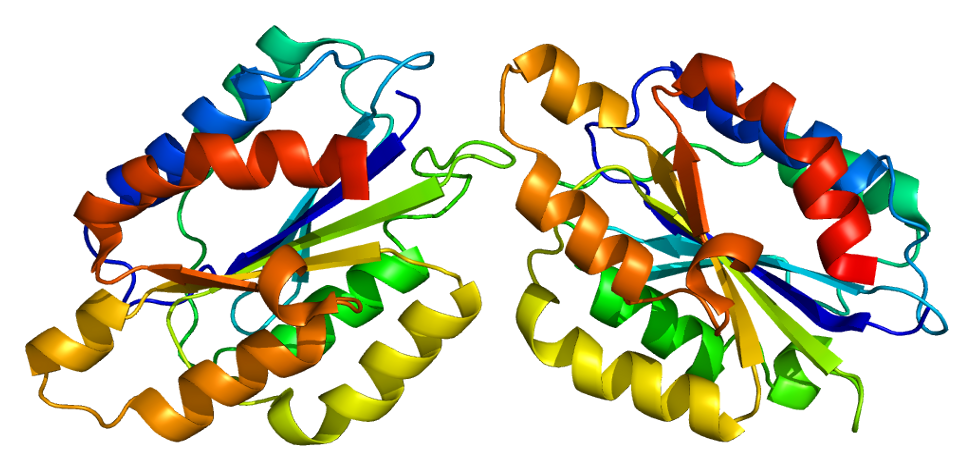

Identifiers
- Aliases: ITGA1, CD49a, VLA1, integrin subunit alpha 1
- External IDs: OMIM: 192968; MGI: 96599; GeneCards: ITGA1
Available structures
PDB	Ortholog search: PDBe RCSB
PDB	List of PDB id codes 1PT6, 1QC5, 1QCY, 2L8S, 4A0Q, 2M32

Gene location (Human)
Chr.	Chromosome 5 (human)
Band	5q11.2	Start	52,787,916 bp
Band	5q11.2	End	52,959,209 bp

Gene location (Mouse)
Chr.	Chromosome 13 (mouse)
Band	13 D2.2|13 64.61 cM	Start	115,089,632 bp
Band	13 D2.2|13 64.61 cM	End	115,238,500 bp
RNA expression pattern
Bgee	Human / Mouse (ortholog); Top expressed in: Achilles tendon; gastric mucosa; right coronary artery; stromal cell of endometrium; epithelium of colon; saphenous vein; right lung; popliteal artery; tibial arteries; left coronary artery / Top expressed in: right lung; right lung lobe; umbilical cord; aorta; left lung lobe; ascending aorta; sciatic nerve; brown adipose tissue; vas deferens; decidua; More reference expression data
BioGPS	n/a
Gene ontology
Molecular function	collagen binding; metal ion binding; protein binding; collagen binding involved in cell-matrix adhesion; protein phosphatase binding; signaling receptor binding
Cellular component	integral component of membrane; perikaryon; integrin alpha1-beta1 complex; membrane; focal adhesion; basal part of cell; plasma membrane; cell surface; integrin complex; acrosomal vesicle; membrane raft; neuron projection; extracellular exosome; external side of plasma membrane
Biological process	neuron projection morphogenesis; muscle contraction; negative regulation of epidermal growth factor receptor signaling pathway; extracellular matrix organization; vasodilation; neutrophil chemotaxis; positive regulation of neuron apoptotic process; positive regulation of phosphoprotein phosphatase activity; cell adhesion; cell chemotaxis; integrin-mediated signaling pathway; cellular extravasation; cell-matrix adhesion; negative regulation of cell population proliferation
Sources:Amigo / QuickGO
Orthologs
Databases	NCBI: entry; OMA: entry
Species	Human	Mouse
Entrez	3672	109700
Ensembl	ENSG00000213949	ENSMUSG00000042284
UniProt	P56199	Q3V3R4
RefSeq (mRNA)	NM_181501	NM_001033228
RefSeq (protein)	NP_852478	NP_001028400
Location (UCSC)	Chr 5: 52.79 – 52.96 Mb	Chr 13: 115.09 – 115.24 Mb
PubMed search
- Wikidata
View/Edit Human	View/Edit Mouse

Integrin alpha-1 also CD49a is an integrin alpha subunit encoded in humans by the gene ITGA1. It makes up half of the α1β1 integrin duplex. Though CD49a can bind a number of ligands including collagen IV, collagen I, and others.

CD49a has been implicated as a marker of tissue resident memory T cells, where it may be coexpressed with other markers CD103 and CD69. It has been shown to affect the motility of T cells.

== Expression ==
=== Normal tissue and immune expression ===
ITGA1 (integrin subunit alpha 1; CD49a/VLA1) is expressed across multiple tissue and cellular compartments. When it comes to cells, ITGA1 is expressed in multiple cell types such as epithelial cells, endothelial cells, stromal cells, and immune cells. Among immune cells, ITGA1 is specifically expressed on decidual natural killer (dNK) cells more than peripheral blood NK (pNK) cells. This tissue-specific expression contributes to the specialized functional properties of dNK cells previously stated (regulation of adhesion, migration, and immune activity at the maternal-fetal interface). Reduced expression of CD49 has been observed in dNK cells of patients with recurrent spontaneous abortion, which indicates a disease-associated dysregulation of ITGA1 expression. The molecular regulation of ITGA1 expression within immune cells involves non-coding RNA mechanisms. In human dNK cells, the long non-coding RNA: Inc-49a has been identified as a positive regulator of CD49a expression, influencing CD49a-dependent immune cell migration, adhesion, and cytotoxic regulation.

=== Cancer-associated expression ===
ITGA1 expression is frequently altered during tumor development and progression. In pancreatic ductal adenocarcinoma (PDAC), ITGA1 expression is typically low or absent in normal pancreatic ductal epithelial and acinar cells. Expression becomes increased during malignant transformation, however. Elevated ITGA1 expression is detected in pancreatic intraepithelial neoplasia (PanIN) lesions and PDAC tumors, with expression primarily found in tumor epithelial cells. Approximately 42% of PDAC patient samples demonstrate high ITGA1 protein expression. PDAC cell models also show increased surface ITGA1 expression, including enrichment within ALDH1^{hi} stem-like tumor cell populations, suggesting association with highly tumorigenic cell states. In retinoblastoma (Rb), ITGA1 is significantly upregulated compared to normal retinal tissue. Transcriptomic analysis identified ITGA1 as one of the most highly upregulated integrin subunits in Rb samples. Increased ITGA1 expression was confirmed at the protein level by immunohistochemistry, and retinoblastoma Y79 cells showed elevated ITGA1 and ITGB1 expression when compared with normal retinal pigment epithelial ARPE-19 cells. These findings indicate. tumor-associated activation of α1β1 integrin signaling in retinoblastoma. In glioma, ITGA1 expression is associated with chemotherapy resistance. TMZ-resistant glioma tissues and U87/R glioma cells exhibit increased ITGA1 mRNA and protein expression compared with TMZ-sensitive controls. Elevated ITGA1 expression correlates with activation of survival pathways and is regulated through a non-coding RNA mechanism involving hsa_circ_0110757, which increases ITGA1 expression by suppressing hsa-miR-1298-5p.

=== Vascular and metabolic disease expression ===
ITGA1 expression is also altered in non-cancer disease states. In diabetic foot ulcers (DFU), ITGA1 is upregulated in wound tissues from diabetic patients and in advanced glycation and end product (AGE)-treated human endothelial cells. Increased ITGA1 expression is associated with endothelial dysfunction, impaired proliferation and migration, reduced tube formation, and increased cellular senescence. Reduction of ITGA1 expression improves endothelial functional responses, suggesting that disease-associated ITGA1 activation contributes to impaired wound healing.

== Structure ==
The ITGA1 gene is located on chromosome 5 at cytogenetic band 5q11.2 and spans around 171kb on the positive strand of the human GRCh38 reference genome. The ITGA1 gene encodes the Integrin alpha-1 subunit, a type I transmembrane glycoprotein belonging to the integrin family of cell adhesion receptors. The alpha-1 (α1) Integrin subunit contains an inserted von Willebrand factor type I (I) domain, which mediates the action of binding to collagen. ITGA1 noncovalently associates with the Beta-1 (β1) integrin subunit to form the α1β1 integrin heterodimer, which is a cell-surface receptor also involved in extracellular matrix (ECM) adhesion and signal transduction. The α1β1 integrin receptor is mainly found in the plasma membrane and cell surface, where it is enriched at focal adhesions, which are specialized sites that mediate ECM attachment and intracellular signaling of cells. Gene Ontology annotations also support ITGA1 as a component of the integrin α1β1 complex, which is consistent with its role as an obligate heterodimeric receptor.

== Function ==
=== Extracellular matrix adhesion and signaling ===
Integrin alpha-1 (ITGA1), when linked with Integrin beta-1 (ITGB1), forms the α1β1 Integrin receptor. The α1β1 is a transmembrane extracellular matrix (ECM) receptor that mediates cell adhesion and intracellular signaling. By binding collagen and laminin, ITGA1 allows cells to sense and respond to changes in the ECM. These interactions are how ITGA1 regulates cell-matrix adhesion, focal adhesion formation, ECM organization, and downstream pathways controlling cell survival, proliferation, migration, and differentiation. The molecular functions of ITGA1 include collagen binding, collagen-mediated cell-matrix adhesion, protein interactions involved in signaling pathways, and localizations to the cell surface, plasma membrane, focal adhesions, and integrin complexes. These attributes aid in its function as a key mediator of ECM-dependent cellular communication.

=== Regulation of cell adhesion, migration, and survival ===
The α1β1 Integrin receptor binds collagens in the ECM and connects the α1β1 integrin complex to f-actin through the cytoplasmic tails of the integrin's recruitment of focal adhesion adaptor proteins (Talin, Kindlin, Paxillin, Vinculin, A-Actinin) which connects ECM to the actin cytoskeleton inside cells. This helps cells stick to and move throughout tissues. The interactions Integrin Alpha-1 has with the extracellular matrix promotes cell adhesion, migration, survival, and metastasis. In Pancreatic Ductal Adenocarcinoma (PDAC), ITGA1 promotes tumor cell adhesion and migration on collagen substrates. Loss of ITGA1 reduces collagen-dependent attachment, spreading, and cellular viability, demonstrating that ITGA1 functions as a receptor linking ECM composition to cellular behavior. ITGA1 also supports survival of aggressive tumor cell populations. In PDAC, ITGA1 identifies ALDH1-high stem-like cancer cells and contributes to the maintenance and viability of tumor-initiating populations. Reduction of ITGA1 decreases survival of ALDH1-high cells, which suggests that ITGA1 regulates pathways involved in tumor cell persistence and stem-like properties.

=== Regulation of epithelial-mesenchymal transition and metastasis ===
ITGA1 mediates communication between collagen-rich ECM environments and transforming growth factor-β (TGFβ) signaling pathways. In pancreatic cancer, ITGA1 promotes TGFβ/collagen-induced epithelial-mesenchymal transition (EMT), which is distinguishable by decreased epithelial markers such as E-cadherin (CDH1) as well as increased mesenchymal markers such as FN1, ZEB1, VIM, and MUC1. Through these mechanisms, ITGA1 promotes cellular plasticity. This is associated with invasion and metastatic progression. ITGA1 is required for efficient metastatic dissemination of living PDAC cells. Loss of ITGA1 reduces tumor spread in experimental models, displaying ITGA1's contribution to metastatic behavior by enabling tumor cells to respond to collagen and TGFβ-rich micro-environments.

=== Regulation of intracellular signaling pathways ===
TGA1 also regulates intracellular signaling pathways that control tumor-associated behaviors. In retinoblastoma, ITGA1 promotes proliferation, migration, and colony formation through the activation of STAT3 signaling. ITGA1 inhibition decreases STAT3 expression, phosphorylated STAT3 activity, STAT3 nuclear localization, and focal adhesion kinase (FAK) signaling. Restoring STAT3 activity partially recovers the effects of ITGA1 suppression. Transcriptomic analysis of ITGA1-inhibited retinoblastoma cells showed altered regulation of genes involved in focal adhesion, ECM-receptor interactions, integrin signaling, and JAK-STAT pathways, indicating that ITGA1 works as a regulator of multiple signaling networks.

== Physiological significance ==
ITGA1 is biologically significant because it functions as a key mediator of cell-extracellular matrix (ECM) communication. It's able to regulate interactions with ECM components (collagen and laminin) through the formation of the α1β1 integrin receptor. This influences cell adhesion, migration, survival, proliferation, tissue organization, and intracellular signaling, positioning ITGA1's significance as an important regulator of tissue maintenance, cellular adaptation, and responses to the surrounding microenvironment.

The significance of ITGA1 is highly dependent on tissue type, cellular identity, and ECM composition. Although ITGA1 frequently promotes tumor progression in cancers such as PDAC, retinoblastoma, osteosarcoma, and glioma, its biological effects are not universally pro-tumorigenic. In different tissue types, ITGA1 has been observed to exhibit both tumor promoting and tumor suppressive functions. For example, ITGA1 has been reported to influence fibrosis-related pathways and normal tissue remodeling responses. Therefore the significance of ITGA1 depends on the specific biological context in which it is expressed.

ITGA1 serves as a critical interface between the extracellular matrix (ECM) and intracellular signaling networks by mediating bidirectional communication between cells and their surrounding microenvironment. Its ability to regulate adhesion, migration, proliferation, immune regulation, and ECM remodeling makes it an important contributor in normal tissue development, homeostasis, and repair while also having a part in pathological processes such as fibrosis, inflammation, and cancer. The diverse roles of ITGA1 highlight its importance as both a mediator of tissue homeostasis and a potential target for diseases driven by abnormal cell-ECM interactions.

== Clinical significance ==
=== Role in cancer progression and therapy resistance ===
ITGA1 contributes to tumor progression by regulating survival, migration, invasion, and resistance to anticancer therapies. In Pancreatic Ductal Adenocarcinoma (PDAC), ITGA1-mediated collagen EMT signaling promotes the survival of mesenchymal tumor cell populations, metastatic dissemination, and resistance to gemcitabine treatment. Inhibition of ITGA1 increases sensitivity to chemotherapy, making treatment more effective and supporting its capacity as a potential therapeutic target. In glioma, ITGA1 contributes to temozolomide (TMZ) resistance by activating the PI3K/AKT/Bcl-2 signaling pathway. Increased ITGA1 activity promotes anti-apoptotic signaling which prevents tumor cells from apoptosizing therefore leading to survival of tumor cells. Suppressing ITGA1 increases apoptosis and improves TMZ sensitivity. ITGA1 expression in glioma is regulated by the hsa-miR01298-5p pathway, which directly binds the ITGA1 3' untranslated region to suppress ITGA1 expression. Increased ITGA1 reverses those effects, making resistance to chemotherapy more likely.

=== Regulation of vascular function and tissue repair ===
ITGA1 influences endothelial cell function during wound healing in patients with diabetes. When tested, increased ITGA1 activity in advanced glycation end produce (AGE)-treated endothelial cells contributed to impaired proliferation, reduced migration, decreased tube formation, and increased cellular senescence. Once ITGA1 was reduced, cell proliferation, metastasis, formation of blood vessels, and fewer signs of aging in cells improved. This suggests a possible link between vascular repair and angiogenic regulation.

=== Immune regulation ===
ITGA1 is expressed on multiple immune cell populations, including T cells, natural killer T (NKT) cells, and natural killer (NK) cells. It contributes to innate and adaptive immune responses by regulating immune cell adhesion, migration, tissue retention, inflammatory signaling, cell growth, and differentiation. In human decidual NK (dNK) cells, ITGA1 regulates adhesion, migration, and cytotoxic activity. Blocking CD49a (aka ITGA1) limits dNK migration and adhesion while increasing expression of cytotoxic molecules such as perforin, granzyme B, and interferon-γ, indicating that ITGA1 maintains the specialized immune-regulatory phenotype of dNK cells during pregnancy. ITGA1 also contributes to immune cell retention and tissue maintenance through collagen-dependent signaling. Collagen binding activates pathways that promote immune cell proliferation and inflammatory cytokine secretion and may regulate angiogenic responses through increased ITGA1 expression on endothelial and mesangial cells.

=== Importance in cancer biology ===
ITGA1 has shown to be an important regulator of cancer progression because malignant cells frequently exploit integrin-mediated ECM signaling to promote survival, invasion, metastasis, and therapy resistance. Dysregulated integrin signaling is associated with tumor development across multiple types of cancer, making ITGA1 a potential biomarker and therapeutic target. In PDAC, ITGA1 contributes to tumor progression by linking collagen-rich ECM environments with intracellular signaling pathways that support EMT, metastatic dissemination and survival. ITGA1 was identified as part of a protein network associated with PDAC progression emphasizing its importance in tumor biology. In retinoblastoma, ITGA1 is a possible therapeutic target because ITGA1 expression promotes the same functions of tumor cells through activation of downstream signaling pathways like FAK and STAT3. Pharmacological or genetic inhibition of ITGA1 reduces tumor progression, exhibiting the potential importance of targeting ITGA1-associated signaling pathways in pediatric cancers. In glioma, ITGA1 contributes to treatment resistance by promoting cell survival signaling. Increased ITGA1 activity supports activation of the PI3K/AKT pathway and anti-apoptotic signaling through Bcl-2, promoting resistance toward temozolomide. The involvement of ITGA1 in drug resistance highlights its role in regulating tumor cell adaptation to therapeutic stress.

=== Therapeutic significance ===
Because ITGA1 regulates ECM interactions and signaling pathways involved in cell survival, migration, metastasis, invasion, and treatment resistance, it has emerged as a potential therapeutic target in several diseases. However, the context dependent nature of ITGA1 suggests that therapeutic strategies targeting ITGA1 will likely require tissue and disease-specific approaches to maximize therapeutic efficacy while minimizing disruption of normal physiological processes. Preclinical research indicates that inhibition of ITGA1 or its downstream signaling molecules, such as FAK, PI3K/AKT, and in some cases STAT3, could suppress disease progression; however, these approaches have not yet been validated in clinical trials.

== Relevance ==
ITGA1 has been connected to a variety of pathological conditions such as cancer progression, therapy resistance, fibrosis, and immune-mediated disorders. As the α1 subunit of the α1β1 integrin receptor, ITGA1 forms a heterodimer with ITGB1 that mediates interactions between cells and the extracellular matrix (ECM), linking extracellular cues to intracellular signaling pathways that regulate cell adhesion, survival, migration, invasion, and tissue remodeling. Dysregulation of α1β1 integrin signaling can promote tumor progression by enhancing communication between tumor cells and the surrounding microenvironment.

=== Cancer progression and metastasis ===
ITGA1 has emerged as an important mediator of pancreatic ductal adenocarcinoma (PDAC) progression. In PDAC and pancreatic intraepithelial neoplasia (PanIN), increased ITGA1 expression has been associated with aggressive disease features as well as poor prognosis of patients. Because ITGA1 is increased in premalignant lesions and encodes a cell-surface receptor, it has been proposed as a potential biomarker for early disease detection and as a therapeutic target. The ITGA1-collagen signaling axis contributes to tumor progression by regulating extracellular matrix interactions, invasion, metastatic dissemination, and resistance to chemotherapies. Increased expression of ITGA1-associated collagen ligands including type IV and type VI collagen, is also associated with aggressive tumor features, including higher tumor grade, TP53 mutation status, and erlotinib resistance. Overexpression of ITGA1 has similarly been found in other malignancies like melanoma, prostate cancer, bladder cancer, hepatocellular carcinoma, and multiple myeloma, where it is associated with invasive phenotypes, metastatic behavior and tumor progression. This association supports the identification of ITGA1 as a potential biomarker and therapeutic target across multiple cancer types.

=== Therapeutic resistance and tumor aggressiveness ===
In pancreatic ductal adenocarcinoma (PDAC), ITGA1 promotes tumor progression by regulating tumor cell survival, extracellular matrix (ECM) signaling, and chemotherapy resistance. ITGA1-mediated signaling enhances epithelial-mesenchymal transition (EMT), metastatic potential, and resistance to gemcitabine, a commonly used chemotherapeutic agent for PDAC. Inhibition of ITGA1 increases sensitivity to chemotherapy, suggesting that targeting ITGA1-dependent ECM signaling may improve therapeutic responses in aggressive pancreatic cancer. In PDAC, ITGA1 marks and functionally regulates AIDH1-high pancreatic cancer cells with stem-like properties. These ITGA1-positive tumor-initiating cells lead to metastasis, therapy resistance, as well as poor prognosis. Inhibition of ITGA1 reduces the tumor-initiating ability of these cells, suggesting that ITGA1 may represent a strategy for targeting resistant cancer populations in PDAC.

=== Retinoblastoma ===
More recent studies have identified ITGA1 as a potential therapeutic target in retinoblastoma (Rb). ITGA1 promotes Rb progression by activating the FAK/STAT3 signaling pathway. Restoration of STAT3 partially reverses the effects of ITGA1 inhibition, supporting the role of this pathway in ITGA1-mediated tumor growth. Genetic knockdown or pharmacological inhibition of ITGA1 suppresses retinoblastoma cell proliferation, migration, colony formation, and growth in vivo. Inhibition of the α1β1 integrin receptor using genetic approaches or the α1β1 inhibitor obtustatin reduces tumor progression, suggesting that ITGA1-targeted therapies may represent a potential strategy for treating high-risk retinobloastoma. However, further research and testing are needed to confirm the safety and efficacy of ITGA1 inhibition before it is used as a clinical treatment.

=== Glioma and chemotherapy resistance ===
ITGA1 has been implicated in resistance to glioma treatment as well. The particular treatment it is resistant to is temozolomide (TMZ), which is the standard first-line chemotherapy agent used with radiotherapy and adjuvant treatment. There is an observed elevation of ITGA1 expression in TMZ-resistant glioma tissues when compared with a control group of TMZ-sensitive cell lines. Tumor cell survival is promoted by ITGA1 activating the PI3K/AKT pathway, subsequently increasing the anti-apoptotic Bcl-2 signaling and reducing apoptosis. A regulatory pathway involving hsa_circ_0110757 and hsa-miR-1298-5p controls ITGA1 expression in TMZ-resistant glioma. hsc_circ_0110757 functions as a competing endogenous RNA by sponging miR-1298-5p, which promotes ITGA1 expression and leads to increased PI3K/AKT activation as well as reduced apoptosis, and enhanced TMZ resistance. Disrupting this pathway restores the cell sensitivity to chemotherapy. This supports ITGA1 as a possible therapeutic target to overcome drug resistance in glioma.

=== Immune regulation and pregnancy-associated disorders ===
Beyond cancer, ITGA1 (also known as CD49a) plays an important role in immune cell regulation, particularly in decidual natural killer (dNK) cells. CD49a (ITGA1) is highly expressed on dNK cells, and reduced CD49a expression has been observed in dNK cells from patients with recurrent spontaneous abortion (RSA), suggesting that impaired ITGA1 signaling may contribute to and pregnancy complications. CD49a regulates dNK cell function by influencing migration, adhesion, and expression of cytotoxic molecules (perforin, granzyme B, interferon-γ). Long non-coding RNA Inc-49a has been identified as a positive regulator of CD49a expression, indicating that ITGA1 may be controlled through RNA-mediated regulatory mechanisms in immune cells.

=== Endothelial dysfunction and diabetic would healing ===
ITGA1 has been associated with vascular dysfunction in diabetic would healing, more specifically diabetic foot ulcers. Increased ITGA1 expression has been observed in diabetic wound tissues and AGEs-treated human umbilical vein endothelial cells (HUVECs). While elevated ITGA1 expression contributes to endothelial cell dysfunction by impairing proliferation, migration, and tube formation, while promoting cellular senescence; inhibiting ITGA1 restores endothelial cell function. This suggests ITGA1's contribution to diabetic wound pathology, and may represent a potential therapeutic target for vascular repair.

== History ==
ITGA1 was first identified in 1986 as a Very Late Antigen-1 (VLA-1), a surface protein expressed on activated T lymphocytes. Later studies demonstrated that VLA-1 corresponds to the α1 integrin subunit, which pairs with the β1 integrin subunit to fom the α1β1 heterodimer, a receptor for collagen and laminin. During the early 1990s, cloning of the human ITGA1 gene enabled detailed characterization of its structure and tissue distribution. Structural studies later identified the α1 subunit as one of the integrins containing an inserted von Willebrand factor A domain responsible for collagen recognition. More recent research has expanded the biological significance of ITGA1 beyond cell adhesion to include roles in mechanotransduction, immune regulation, fibrosis, and cancer, leading to growing interest in ITGA1 as a potential therapeutic target.
