= KLRC2 =

Protein-coding gene in humans

Identifiers
- Aliases: KLRC2, CD159c, NKG2-C, NKG2C, killer cell lectin like receptor C2
- External IDs: OMIM: 602891; GeneCards: KLRC2
Available structures
PDB	Human UniProt search: PDBe RCSB
PDB	List of PDB id codes 2L35

Gene location (Human)
Chr.	Chromosome 12 (human)
Band	12p13.2	Start	10,426,854 bp
Band	12p13.2	End	10,442,300 bp
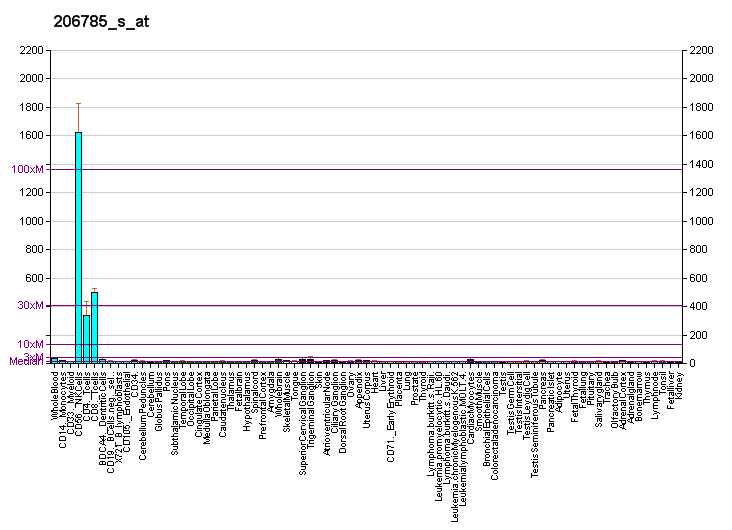
RNA expression pattern
Bgee	Human / Mouse (ortholog); Top expressed in: granulocyte; testicle; amygdala; hypothalamus; substantia nigra; hippocampus proper; C1 segment; putamen; prefrontal cortex; anterior cingulate cortex / n/a; More reference expression data
BioGPS	More reference expression data
Gene ontology
Molecular function	protein antigen binding; protein binding; transmembrane signaling receptor activity; MHC class I protein complex binding; carbohydrate binding
Cellular component	integral component of membrane; receptor complex; plasma membrane; integral component of plasma membrane; membrane
Biological process	cellular defense response; innate immune response; signal transduction; natural killer cell mediated immunity
Sources:Amigo / QuickGO
Orthologs
Databases	NCBI: entry; OMA: entry
Species	Human	Mouse
Entrez	3822	n/a
Ensembl	ENSG00000205809	n/a
UniProt	P26717	n/a
RefSeq (mRNA)	NM_002260	n/a
RefSeq (protein)	NP_002251	n/a
Location (UCSC)	Chr 12: 10.43 – 10.44 Mb	n/a
PubMed search		n/a
- Wikidata
View/Edit Human

NKG2-C type II integral membrane protein or NKG2C is a protein that in humans is encoded by the KLRC2 gene. It is also known as or cluster of differentiation 159c (CD159c).

== Function ==
Natural killer (NK) cells are lymphocytes that can mediate lysis of certain tumor cells and virus-infected cells without previous activation. They can also regulate specific humoral and cell-mediated immunity. NK cells preferentially express several calcium-dependent (C-type) lectins, which have been implicated in the regulation of NK cell function. The group, designated KLRC (NKG2) are expressed primarily in natural killer (NK) cells and encodes a family of transmembrane proteins characterized by a type II membrane orientation (extracellular C terminus) and the presence of a C-type lectin domain. The KLRC (NKG2) gene family is located within the NK complex, a region that contains several C-type lectin genes preferentially expressed on NK cells. KLRC2 alternative splice variants have been described but their full-length nature has not been determined.

== Interactions ==
KLRC2 has been shown to interact and form dimers with CD94. The CD94/NKG2C heterodimer can bind to HLA-E and this binding leads to NK cells activation.

During infection with human cytomegalovirus, peptides derived from the virus are presented on HLA-E and natural killer cells that express the CD94/NKG2C receptor can specifically recognise the virus peptides. This recognition leads to activation, expansion, and differentiation of adaptive NK cells.

== See also ==
- Cluster of differentiation
