= NCR1 =

Mammalian protein found in Homo sapiens

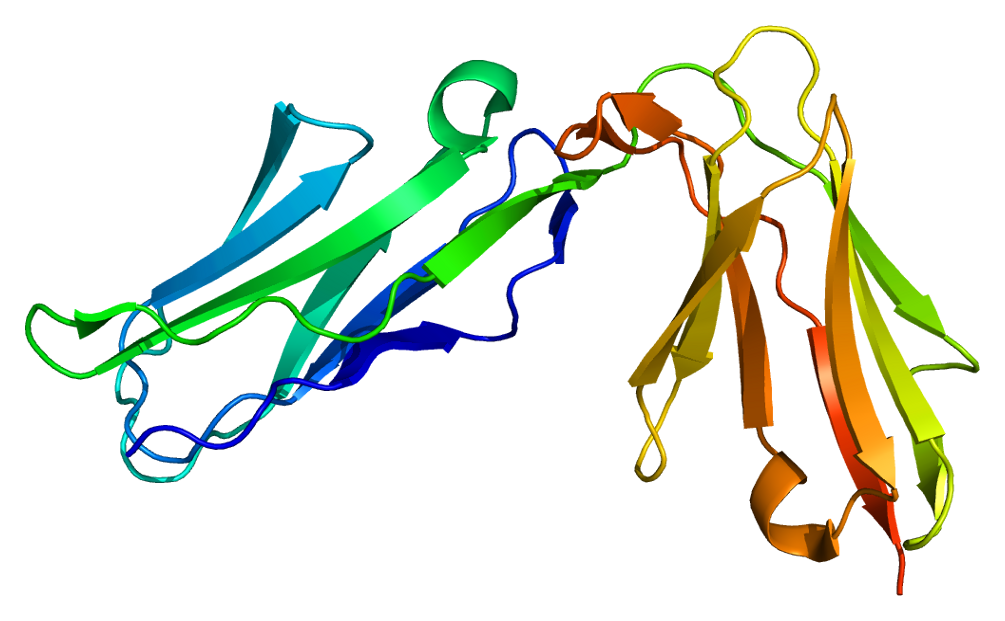

Identifiers
- Aliases: NCR1, CD335, LY94, NK-p46, NKP46, natural cytotoxicity triggering receptor 1
- External IDs: OMIM: 604530; MGI: 1336212; GeneCards: NCR1
Available structures
PDB	Ortholog search: PDBe RCSB
PDB	List of PDB id codes 1OLL, 1P6F

Gene location (Human)
Chr.	Chromosome 19 (human)
Band	19q13.42	Start	54,906,148 bp
Band	19q13.42	End	54,916,140 bp

Gene location (Mouse)
Chr.	Chromosome 7 (mouse)
Band	7|7 A1	Start	4,340,723 bp
Band	7|7 A1	End	4,348,163 bp
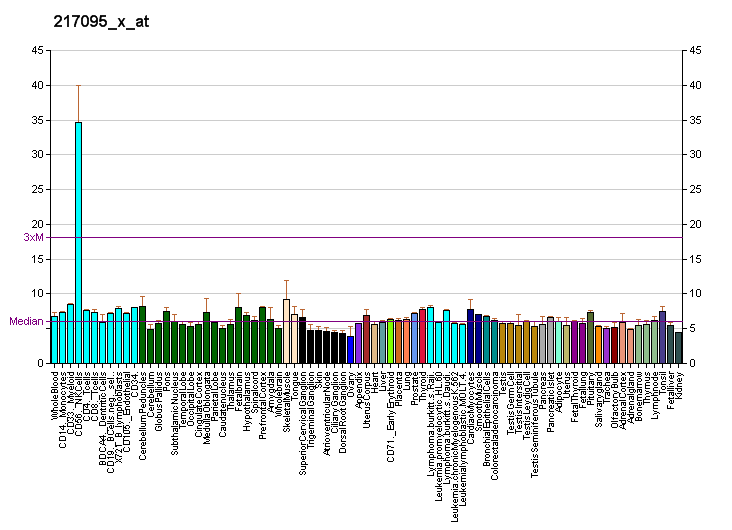

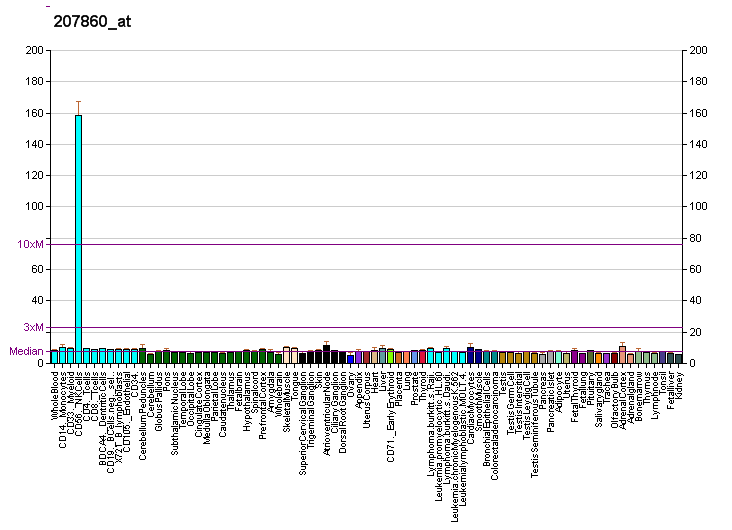

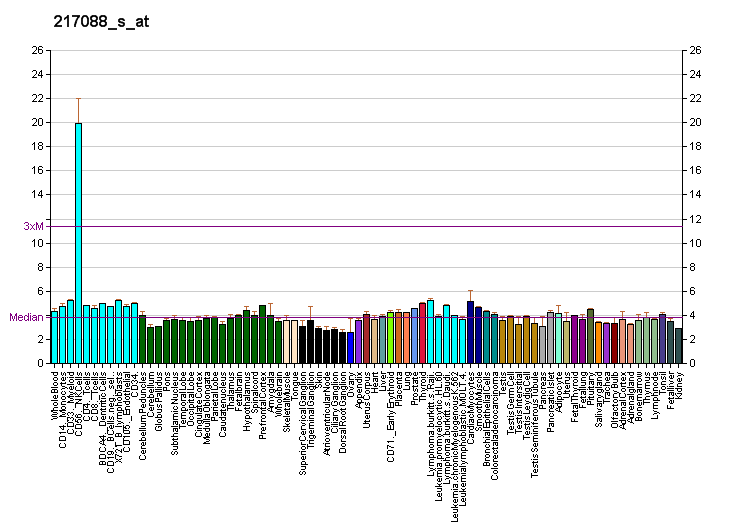
RNA expression pattern
Bgee	Human / Mouse (ortholog); Top expressed in: granulocyte; blood; spleen; bone marrow cell; gonad; monocyte; placenta; liver; right lobe of liver; lymph node / Top expressed in: blood; morula; spleen; granulocyte; gastrula; right lung lobe; submandibular gland; extensor digitorum longus muscle; uterus; upper arm; More reference expression data
BioGPS	More reference expression data
Gene ontology
Molecular function	protein binding
Cellular component	integral component of membrane; plasma membrane; integral component of plasma membrane; SWI/SNF complex; membrane
Biological process	cellular defense response; natural killer cell activation; signal transduction; regulation of immune response; regulation of natural killer cell mediated cytotoxicity
Sources:Amigo / QuickGO
Orthologs
Databases	NCBI: entry; OMA: entry
Species	Human	Mouse
Entrez	9437	17086
Ensembl	ENSG00000273535; ENSG00000277629; ENSG00000273916; ENSG00000275156; ENSG00000277824 ENSG00000277334; ENSG00000278362; ENSG00000275637; ENSG00000274053; ENSG00000275521; ENSG00000275822; ENSG00000277442; ENSG00000189430; ENSG00000284113; ENSG00000273506; ENSG00000276450; ENSG00000278025; ENSG00000288651	ENSMUSG00000062524
UniProt	O76036	Q8C567
RefSeq (mRNA)	NM_001145457; NM_001145458; NM_001242356; NM_001242357; NM_004829	NM_010746; NM_001368364
RefSeq (protein)	NP_001138929; NP_001138930; NP_001229285; NP_001229286; NP_004820	NP_034876; NP_001355293
Location (UCSC)	Chr 19: 54.91 – 54.92 Mb	Chr 7: 4.34 – 4.35 Mb
PubMed search
- Wikidata
View/Edit Human	View/Edit Mouse

Natural cytotoxicity triggering receptor 1 is a protein that in humans is encoded by the NCR1 gene. NCR1 has also been designated as CD335 (cluster of differentiation nomenclature), NKP46, NKp46, NK-p46, and LY94.
