= Natural killer cell =

Type of cytotoxic lymphocyte

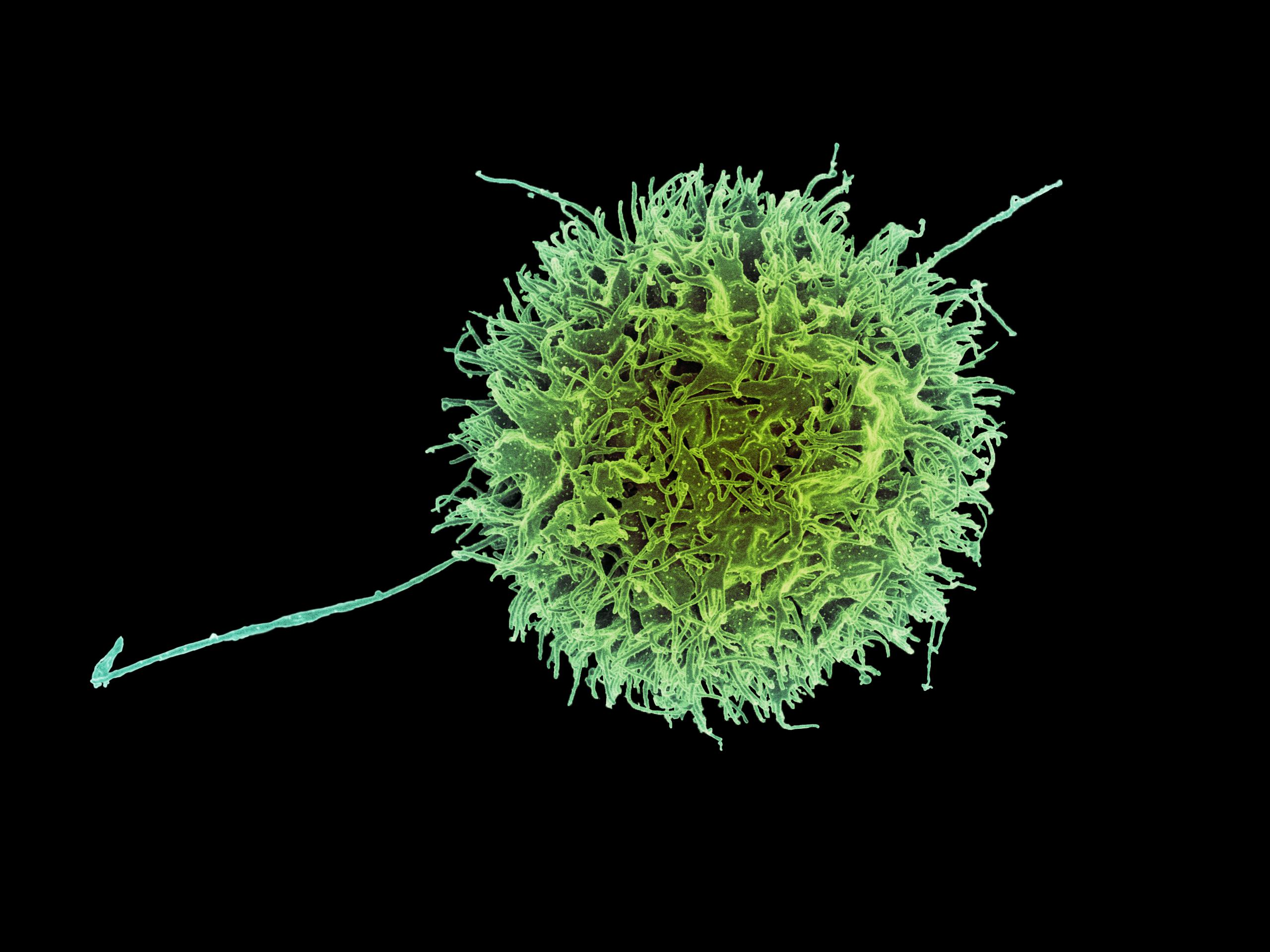
- Human natural killer cell, colorized scanning electron micrograph

Details
- System: Immune system
- Function: Cytotoxic lymphocyte

Identifiers
- MeSH: D007694
- FMA: 63147

Natural killer cells, also known as NK cells, are a type of cytotoxic lymphocyte critical to the innate immune system. They are a kind of large granular lymphocyte (LGL), belong to the rapidly expanding family of known innate lymphoid cells (ILC), and represent 5–20% of all circulating lymphocytes in humans. The role of NK cells is analogous to that of cytotoxic T cells in the vertebrate adaptive immune response. NK cells provide rapid responses to virus-infected cells, stressed cells, tumor cells, and other intracellular pathogens based on signals from several activating and inhibitory receptors. While cytotoxic T cells can only activate by detecting the antigen presented on major histocompatibility complex class I (MHC class I) molecules on infected cell surfaces, NK cells recognize and kill stressed cells that are lacking the MHC class I molecules. They were named "natural killers" because of the notion that they do not require activation to kill cells that are missing "self" markers of MHC class I. This role is especially important because harmful cells that are missing MHC I markers cannot be detected and destroyed by other immune cells, such as T lymphocyte cells.

NK cells can be identified by the presence of CD56 and the absence of CD3 (CD56^{+}, CD3^{−}). NK cells differentiate from CD127^{+} common innate lymphoid progenitor, which is downstream of the common lymphoid progenitor from which B and T lymphocytes are also derived. NK cells are known to differentiate and mature in the bone marrow, lymph nodes, spleen, tonsils, and thymus, where they then enter into the circulation. NK cells differ from natural killer T cells (NKTs) phenotypically, by origin and by respective effector functions; often, NKT cell activity promotes NK cell activity by secreting interferon gamma. In contrast to NKT cells, NK cells do not express T-cell antigen receptors (TCR) or pan T marker CD3 or surface immunoglobulins (Ig) B cell receptors, but they usually express the surface markers CD16 (FcγRIII) and CD57 in humans, NK1.1 or NK1.2 in C57BL/6 mice. The NKp46 cell surface marker constitutes, at the moment, another NK cell marker of preference being expressed in humans, several strains of mice (including BALB/c mice) and in three common monkey species.

Outside of innate immunity, both activating and inhibitory NK cell receptors play important functional roles in self tolerance and the sustaining of NK cell activity. NK cells also play a role in the adaptive immune response: numerous experiments have demonstrated their ability to readily adjust to the immediate environment and formulate antigen-specific immunological memory, fundamental for responding to secondary infections with the same antigen. The role of NK cells in both the innate and adaptive immune responses is becoming increasingly important in research using NK cell activity as a potential cancer therapy and HIV therapy.

== Early history ==
In early experiments on cell-mediated cytotoxicity against tumor target cells, both in cancer patients and animal models, investigators consistently observed what was termed a "natural" reactivity; that is, a certain population of cells seemed to be able to destroy tumor cells without having been previously sensitized to them. The first published study to assert that untreated lymphoid cells were able to confer a natural immunity to tumors was performed by Dr. Henry Smith at the University of Leeds School of Medicine in 1966, leading to the conclusion that the "phenomenon appear[ed] to be an expression of defense mechanisms to tumor growth present in normal mice." Other researchers had also made similar observations, but as these discoveries were inconsistent with the established model at the time, many initially considered these observations to be artifacts.

By 1973, 'natural killing' activity was established across a wide variety of species, and the existence of a separate lineage of cells possessing this ability was postulated. The discovery that a unique type of lymphocyte was responsible for "natural" or spontaneous cytotoxicity was made in the early 1970s by doctoral student Rolf Kiessling and postdoctoral fellow Hugh Pross, in the mouse, and by Hugh Pross and doctoral student Mikael Jondal in the human. The mouse and human work was carried out under the supervision of professors Eva Klein and Hans Wigzell, respectively, of the Karolinska Institute, Stockholm. Kiessling's research involved the well-characterized ability of T lymphocytes to attack tumor cells which they had been previously immunized against. Pross and Jondal were studying cell-mediated cytotoxicity in normal human blood and the effect of the removal of various receptor-bearing cells on this cytotoxicity. Later that same year, Ronald Herberman published similar data with respect to the unique nature of the mouse effector cell. The human data were confirmed, for the most part, by West et al. using similar techniques and the same erythroleukemic target cell line, K562. K562 is highly sensitive to lysis by human NK cells and, over the decades, the K562 ^{51}chromium-release assay has become the most commonly used assay to detect human NK functional activity. Its almost universal use has meant that experimental data can be compared easily by different laboratories around the world.

Using discontinuous density centrifugation, and later monoclonal antibodies, natural killing ability was mapped to the subset of large, granular lymphocytes known today as NK cells. The demonstration that density gradient-isolated large granular lymphocytes were responsible for human NK activity, made by Timonen and Saksela in 1980, was the first time that NK cells had been visualized microscopically, and was a major breakthrough in the field.

== Types ==
Natural killer cells can be classified as CD56^{bright} or CD56^{dim}. CD56^{bright} NK cells are similar to T helper cells in exerting their influence by releasing cytokines. CD56^{bright} NK cells constitute the majority of NK cells, being found in bone marrow, secondary lymphoid tissue, liver, and skin. CD56^{bright} NK cells are characterized by their preferential killing of highly proliferative cells, and thus might have an immunoregulatory role. CD56^{dim} NK cells are primarily found in the peripheral blood, and are characterized by their cell killing ability. CD56^{dim} NK cells are always CD16 positive (CD16 is the key mediator of antibody-dependent cellular cytotoxicity, or ADCC). CD56^{bright} can transition into CD56^{dim} by acquiring CD16.

NK cells can eliminate virus-infected cells via CD16-mediated ADCC.

== Receptors ==
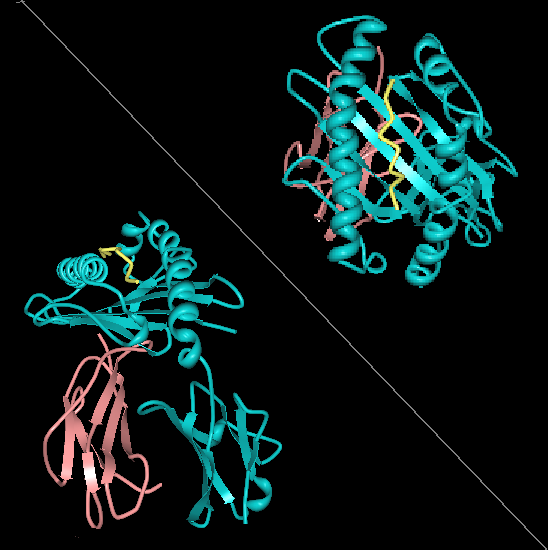
The HLA ligand for KIR

NK cell receptors can also be differentiated based on function. Natural cytotoxicity receptors directly induce apoptosis (cell death) after binding to Fas ligand that directly indicate infection of a cell. The MHC-independent receptors (described above) use an alternate pathway to induce apoptosis in infected cells. Natural killer cell activation is determined by the balance of inhibitory and activating receptor stimulation. For example, if the inhibitory receptor signaling is more prominent, then NK cell activity will be inhibited; similarly, if the activating signal is dominant, then NK cell activation will result.

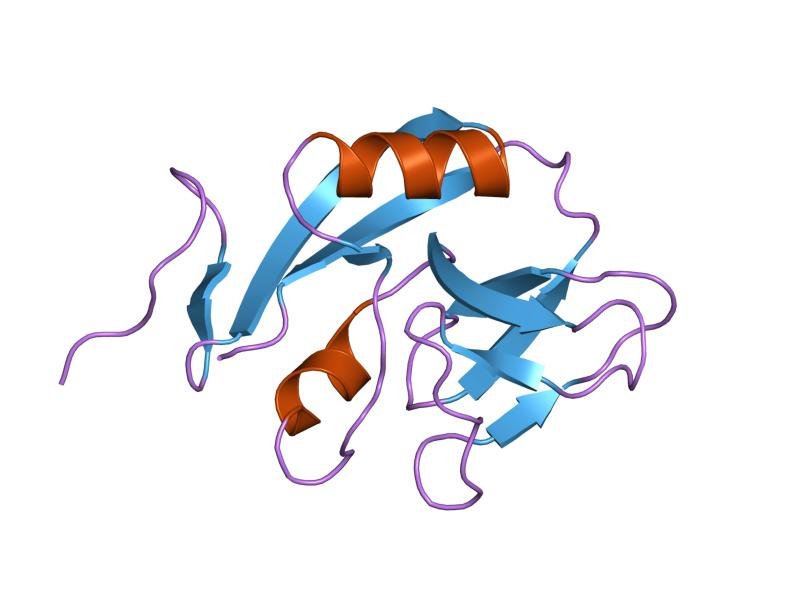
Protein structure of NKG2D

NK cell receptor types (with inhibitory, as well as some activating members) are differentiated by structure, with a few examples to follow:

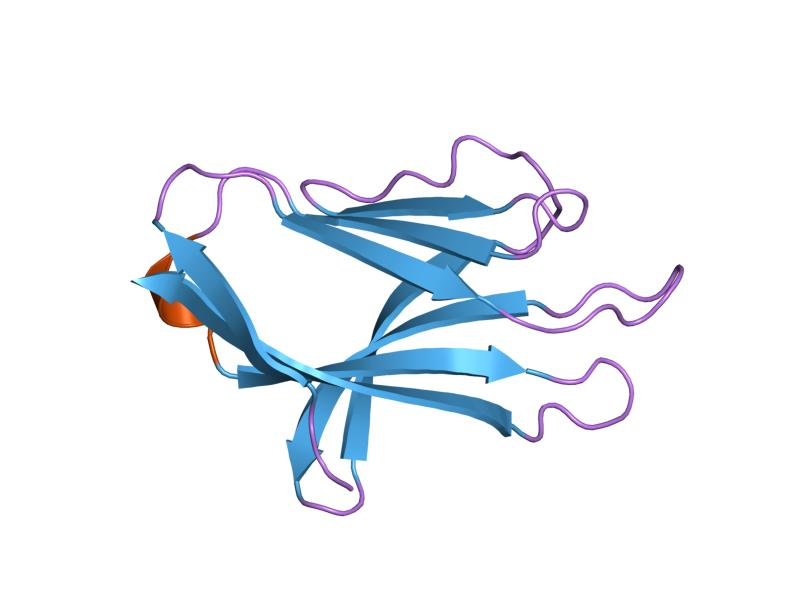
Protein structure of NKp44

=== Activating receptors ===
- Ly49 (homodimers), relatively ancient, C-type lectin family receptors, are of multigenic presence in mice, while humans have only one pseudogenic Ly49, the receptor for classical (polymorphic) MHC I molecules.
- NCR (natural cytotoxicity receptors), type 1 transmembrane proteins of the immunoglobulin superfamily, upon stimulation mediate NK killing and release of IFNγ. They bind viral ligands such as hemagglutinins and hemagglutinin neuraminidases, some bacterial ligands and cellular ligands related to tumour growth such as PCNA.
- CD16 (FcγIIIA) plays a role in antibody-dependent cell-mediated cytotoxicity; in particular, they bind immunoglobulin G.
- TLR – Toll-like receptors are receptors that belong in the group of pattern recognition receptors (PRR) which are typical for the cells of innate immunity but are expressed also on NK cells. They recognize PAMPs (pathogen-associated molecular patterns) and DAMPs (damage-associated molecular patterns) as their ligands. These receptors are crucial for the induction of the immune response. TLR induction amplifies the immune response by promoting the production of inflammatory cytokines and chemokines and ultimately leads to the activation of NK cell effector functions. So NK cells directly react to the presence of pathogens in their surroundings. Apart from TLR-10, NK cells express all of the human TLR although in various levels. NK cells express high levels of TLR-1, moderate levels of TLR-2, TLR-3, TLR-5 and TLR-6, low levels of TLR-4, TLR-8 and TLR-9 and very low levels of TLR-7. TLR receptors are constitutionally expressed independently of their state of activation and they cooperate with cytokines and chemokines on the activation of the natural killer cells. These receptors are expressed extracellularly on the cell surface or endosomally inside the endosomes. Apart from TLR-3 and TLR-4, all TLR signal through adaptor protein MyD88 which ultimately leads mainly to the activation of NF-κB. TLR-3 signals through the adaptor protein TRIF and TLR-4 can switch between signaling through MyD88 and TRIF respectively. Induction of different TLR leads to distinct activation of NK cell functions.

=== Inhibitory receptors ===
- Killer-cell immunoglobulin-like receptors (KIRs) belong to a multigene family of more recently evolved Ig-like extracellular domain receptors; they are present in nonhuman primates, and are the main receptors for both classical MHC I (HLA-A, HLA-B, HLA-C) and nonclassical Mamu-G (HLA-G) in primates. Some KIRs are specific for certain HLA subtypes. Most KIRs are inhibitory and dominant. Regular cells express MHC class 1, so are recognised by KIR receptors and NK cell killing is inhibited.
- CD94/NKG2 (heterodimers), a C-type lectin family receptor, is conserved in both rodents and primates and identifies nonclassical (also nonpolymorphic) MHC I molecules such as HLA-E. Expression of HLA-E at the cell surface is dependent on the presence of nonamer peptide epitope derived from the signal sequence of classical MHC class I molecules, which is generated by the sequential action of signal peptide peptidase and the proteasome. Though indirect, this is a way to survey the levels of classical (polymorphic) HLA molecules.
- ILT or LIR (immunoglobulin-like receptor) – are recently discovered members of the Ig receptor family.
- Ly49 (homodimers) have both activating and inhibitory isoforms. They are highly polymorphic on the population level; though they are structurally unrelated to KIRs, they are the functional homologues of KIRs in mice, including the expression pattern. Ly49s are receptor for classical (polymorphic) MHC I molecules.

== Function ==
=== Cytolytic granule mediated cell apoptosis ===
NK cells are cytotoxic; small granules in their cytoplasm contain proteins such as perforin and proteases known as granzymes. Upon release in close proximity to a cell slated for killing, perforin forms pores in the cell membrane of the target cell, creating an aqueous channel through which the granzymes and associated molecules can enter, inducing either apoptosis or osmotic cell lysis. The distinction between apoptosis and cell lysis is important in immunology: lysing a virus-infected cell could potentially release the virions, whereas apoptosis leads to destruction of the virus inside. α-defensins, antimicrobial molecules, are also secreted by NK cells, and directly kill bacteria by disrupting their cell walls in a manner analogous to that of neutrophils.

=== Antibody-dependent cell-mediated cytotoxicity (ADCC) ===
Infected cells are routinely opsonized with antibodies for detection by immune cells. Antibodies that bind to antigens can be recognised by FcγRIII (CD16) receptors expressed on NK cells, resulting in NK activation, release of cytolytic granules and consequent cell apoptosis. This is a major killing mechanism of some monoclonal antibodies like rituximab (Rituxan), ofatumumab (Azzera), and others. The contribution of antibody-dependent cell-mediated cytotoxicity to tumor cell killing can be measured with a specific test that uses NK-92, an immortal line of NK-like cells licensed to NantKwest, Inc.: the response of NK-92 cells that have been transfected with a high-affinity Fc receptor are compared to that of the "wild type" NK-92 which does not express the Fc receptor.

=== Cytokine-induced NK and Cytotoxic T lymphocyte (CTL) activation ===
Cytokines play a crucial role in NK cell activation. As these are stress molecules released by cells upon viral infection, they serve to signal to the NK cell the presence of viral pathogens in the affected area. Cytokines involved in NK activation include IL-12, IL-15, IL-18, IL-2, and CCL5. NK cells are activated in response to interferons or macrophage-derived cytokines. They serve to contain viral infections while the adaptive immune response generates antigen-specific cytotoxic T cells that can clear the infection. NK cells work to control viral infections by secreting IFNγ and TNFα. IFNγ activates macrophages for phagocytosis and lysis, and TNFα acts to promote direct NK tumor cell killing. Patients deficient in NK cells prove to be highly susceptible to early phases of herpes virus infection.

=== Missing 'self' hypothesis ===
Schematic diagram indicating the complementary activities of cytotoxic T cells and NK cells

For NK cells to defend the body against viruses and other pathogens, they require mechanisms that enable the determination of whether a cell is infected or not. The exact mechanisms remain the subject of current investigation, but recognition of an "altered self" state is thought to be involved. To control their cytotoxic activity, NK cells possess two types of surface receptors: activating receptors and inhibitory receptors, including killer-cell immunoglobulin-like receptors. Most of these receptors are not unique to NK cells and can be present in some T cell subsets, as well.

The inhibitory receptors recognize MHC class I alleles, which could explain why NK cells preferentially kill cells that possess low levels of MHC class I molecules. This mode of NK cell target interaction is known as "missing-self recognition", a term coined by Klas Kärre and co-workers in the late 90s. MHC class I molecules are the main mechanism by which cells display viral or tumor antigens to cytotoxic T cells. A common evolutionary adaptation to this is seen in both intracellular microbes and tumors: the chronic down-regulation of MHC I molecules, which makes affected cells invisible to T cells, allowing them to evade T cell-mediated immunity. NK cells apparently evolved as an evolutionary response to this adaptation (the loss of the MHC eliminates CD4/CD8 action, so another immune cell evolved to fulfill the function).

=== Tumor cell surveillance ===
Natural killer cells often lack antigen-specific cell surface receptors, so are part of innate immunity, i.e. able to react immediately with no prior exposure to the pathogen. In both mice and humans, NKs can be seen to play a role in tumor immunosurveillance by directly inducing the death of tumor cells (NKs act as cytolytic effector lymphocytes), even in the absence of surface adhesion molecules and antigenic peptides. This role of NK cells is critical to immune success particularly because T cells are unable to recognize pathogens in the absence of surface antigens. Tumor cell detection results in activation of NK cells and consequent cytokine production and release.

If tumor cells do not cause inflammation, they will also be regarded as self and will not induce a T cell response. A number of cytokines are produced by NKs, including tumor necrosis factor α (TNFα), IFNγ, and interleukin (IL-10). TNFα and IL-10 act as proinflammatory and immunosuppressors, respectively. The activation of NK cells and subsequent production of cytolytic effector cells impacts macrophages, dendritic cells, and neutrophils, which subsequently enables antigen-specific T and B cell responses. Instead of acting via antigen-specific receptors, lysis of tumor cells by NK cells is mediated by alternative receptors, including NKG2D, NKp44, NKp46, NKp30, and DNAM. NKG2D is a disulfide-linked homodimer which recognizes a number of ligands, including ULBP and MICA, which are typically expressed on tumor cells. The role of dendritic cell—NK cell interface in immunobiology have been studied and defined as critical for the comprehension of the complex immune system.

NK cells, along with macrophages and several other cell types, express the Fc receptor (FcR) molecule (FC-gamma-RIII = CD16), an activating biochemical receptor that binds the Fc portion of IgG class antibodies. This allows NK cells to target cells against which there has been a humoral response and to lyse cells through antibody-dependant cytotoxicity (ADCC). This response depends on the affinity of the Fc receptor expressed on NK cells, which can have high, intermediate, and low affinity for the Fc portion of the antibody. This affinity is determined by the amino acid in position 158 of the protein, which can be phenylalanine (F allele) or valine (V allele). Individuals with high-affinity FcRgammRIII (158 V/V allele) respond better to antibody therapy. This has been shown for lymphoma patients who received the antibody Rituxan. Patients who express the 158 V/V allele had a better antitumor response. Only 15–25% of the population expresses the 158 V/V allele. To determine the ADCC contribution of monoclonal antibodies, NK-92 cells (a "pure" NK cell line) has been transfected with the gene for the high-affinity FcR.

=== Clearance of senescent cells ===
Natural killer cells (NK cells) and macrophages play a major role in clearance of senescent cells. Natural killer cells directly kill senescent cells, and produce cytokines which activate macrophages which remove senescent cells.

Natural killer cells can use NKG2D receptors to detect senescent cells, and kill those cells using perforin pore-forming cytolytic protein. CD8+ cytotoxic T-lymphocytes also use NKG2D receptors to detect senescent cells, and promote killing similar to NK cells. For example, in patients with Parkinson's disease, levels of Natural killer cells are elevated as they degrade alpha-synuclein aggregates, destroy senescent neurons, and attenuate the neuroinflammation by leukocytes in the central nervous system.

=== Adaptive features of NK cells—"memory-like", "adaptive" and memory NK cells ===
The ability to generate memory cells following a primary infection and the consequent rapid immune activation and response to succeeding infections by the same antigen is fundamental to the role that T and B cells play in the adaptive immune response. For many years, NK cells have been considered to be a part of the innate immune system. However, recently increasing evidence suggests that NK cells can display several features that are usually attributed to adaptive immune cells (e.g. T cell responses) such as dynamic expansion and contraction of subsets, increased longevity and a form of immunological memory, characterized by a more potent response upon secondary challenge with the same antigen. In mice, the majority of research was carried out with murine cytomegalovirus (MCMV) and in models of hapten-hypersensitivity reactions. Especially, in the MCMV model, protective memory functions of MCMV-induced NK cells were discovered and direct recognition of the MCMV-ligand m157 by the receptor Ly49 was demonstrated to be crucial for the generation of adaptive NK cell responses. In humans, most studies have focused on the expansion of an NK cell subset carrying the activating receptor NKG2C (KLRC2). Such expansions were observed primarily in response to human cytomegalovirus (HCMV), but also in other infections including Hantavirus, Chikungunya virus, HIV, or viral hepatitis. However, whether these virus infections trigger the expansion of adaptive NKG2C+ NK cells or whether other infections result in re-activation of latent HCMV (as suggested for hepatitis), remains a field of study. Notably, recent research suggests that adaptive NK cells can use the activating receptor NKG2C (KLRC2) to directly bind to human cytomegalovirus-derived peptide antigens and respond to peptide recognition with activation, expansion, and differentiation, a mechanism of responding to virus infections that was previously only known for T cells of the adaptive immune system.

=== NK cell function in pregnancy ===
As the majority of pregnancies involve two parents who are not tissue-matched, successful pregnancy requires the mother's immune system to be suppressed. NK cells are thought to be an important cell type in this process. These cells are known as "uterine NK cells" (uNK cells) and they differ from peripheral NK cells. They are in the CD56^{bright} NK cell subset, potent at cytokine secretion, but with low cytotoxic ability and relatively similar to peripheral CD56^{bright} NK cells, with a slightly different receptor profile. These uNK cells are the most abundant leukocytes present in utero in early pregnancy, representing about 70% of leukocytes here, but from where they originate remains controversial.

These NK cells have the ability to elicit cell cytotoxicity in vitro, but at a lower level than peripheral NK cells, despite containing perforin. Lack of cytotoxicity in vivo may be due to the presence of ligands for their inhibitory receptors. Trophoblast cells downregulate HLA-A and HLA-B to defend against cytotoxic T cell-mediated death. This would normally trigger NK cells by missing self recognition; however, these cells survive. The selective retention of HLA-E (which is a ligand for NK cell inhibitory receptor NKG2A) and HLA-G (which is a ligand for NK cell inhibitory receptor KIR2DL4) by the trophoblast is thought to defend it against NK cell-mediated death.

Uterine NK cells have shown no significant difference in women with recurrent miscarriage compared with controls. However, higher peripheral NK cell percentages occur in women with recurrent miscarriages than in control groups.

NK cells secrete a high level of cytokines which help mediate their function. NK cells interact with HLA-C to produce cytokines necessary for trophoblastic proliferation. Some important cytokines they secrete include TNF-α, IL-10, IFN-γ, GM-CSF and TGF-β, among others. For example, IFN-γ dilates and thins the walls of maternal spiral arteries to enhance blood flow to the implantation site.

=== NK cell evasion by tumor cells ===
By shedding decoy NKG2D soluble ligands, tumor cells may avoid immune responses. These soluble NKG2D ligands bind to NK cell NKG2D receptors, activating a false NK response and consequently creating competition for the receptor site. This method of evasion occurs in prostate cancer. In addition, prostate cancer tumors can evade CD8 cell recognition due to their ability to downregulate expression of MHC class 1 molecules. This example of immune evasion actually highlights NK cells' importance in tumor surveillance and response, as CD8 cells can consequently only act on tumor cells in response to NK-initiated cytokine production (adaptive immune response).

=== Excessive NK cells ===
Experimental treatments with NK cells have resulted in excessive cytokine production, and even septic shock. Depletion of the inflammatory cytokine interferon gamma reversed the effect.

== Applications ==
=== Anticancer therapy ===
Tumor-infiltrating NK cells have been reported to play a critical role in promoting drug-induced cell death in human triple-negative breast cancer. Since NK cells recognize target cells when they express nonself HLA antigens (but not self), autologous (patients' own) NK cell infusions have not shown any antitumor effects. Instead, investigators are working on using allogeneic cells from peripheral blood, which requires that all T cells be removed before infusion into the patients to remove the risk of graft versus host disease, which can be fatal. This can be achieved using an immunomagnetic column (CliniMACS). In addition, because of the limited number of NK cells in blood (only 10% of lymphocytes are NK cells), their number needs to be expanded in culture. This can take a few weeks and the yield is donor-dependent.

=== CAR-NK cells ===
Chimeric antigen receptors (CARs) are genetically modified receptors targeting cell surface antigens that provide a valuable approach to enhance effector cell efficacy. CARs induce high-affinity binding of effector cells carrying these receptors to cells expressing the target antigen, thereby lowering the threshold for cellular activation and inducing effector functions.

CAR T cells are now a fairly well-known cell therapy. However, wider use is limited by several fundamental problems: The high cost of CAR T cell therapy, which is due to the need to generate specific CAR T cells for each patient; the necessity to use only autologous T cells, due to the high risk of GvHD if allogeneic T cells are used; the inability to reinfuse CAR T cells if the patient relapses or low CAR T cell survival is observed; CAR T therapy also has a high toxicity, mainly due to IFN-γ production and subsequent induction of CRS (cytokine release syndrome) and/or neurotoxicity.

The use of CAR NK cells is not limited by the need to generate patient-specific cells, and at the same time, GvHD is not caused by NK cells, thus obviating the need for autologous cells. Toxic effects of CAR T therapy, such as CSR, have not been observed with the use of CAR NK cells. Thus, NK cells are considered an interesting "off-the-shelf" product option. Compared to CAR T cells, CAR NK cells retain unchanged expression of NK cell activating receptors. Thus, NK cells recognize and kill tumor cells even if, due to a tumor-escape strategy on tumor cells, ligand expression for the CAR receptor is downregulated.

NK cells derived from umbilical cord blood have been used to generate CAR.CD19 NK cells. These cells are capable of self-producing the cytokine IL-15, thereby enhancing autocrine/paracrine expression and persistence in vivo. Administration of these modified NK cells is not associated with the development of CSR, neurotoxicity, or GvHD.

The FT596 product is the first "Off-the-Shelf", universal, and allogenic CAR NK cellular product derived from iPSCs to be authorized for use in clinical studies in the USA. It consists of an anti-CD19 CAR optimized for NK cells with a transmembrane domain for the NKG2D activation receptor, a 2B4 costimulatory domain and a CD3ζ signaling domain. Two additional key components were added: 1) a high-affinity, non-cleavable Fc receptor CD16 (hnCD16) that enables tumor targeting and enhanced antibody-dependent cell cytotoxicity without negative regulation, combined with 2) a therapeutic monoclonal antibody targeting tumor cells and an IL-15/IL-15 receptor fusion protein (IL-15RF) promoting cytokine-independent persistence.

=== NK-92 cells ===
A more efficient way to obtain high numbers of NK cells is to expand NK-92 cells, an NK cell line with all the characteristics of highly active blood Natural Killer (NK) cells but with much broader and higher cytotoxicity. NK-92 cells grow continuously in culture and can be expanded to clinical-grade numbers in bags or bioreactors. Clinical studies have shown NK-92 cells to be safe and to exhibit anti-tumor activity in patients with lung or pancreatic cancer, melanoma, and lymphoma. When NK-92 cells originate from a patient with lymphoma, they must be irradiated prior to infusion. Efforts, however, are being made to engineer the cells to eliminate the need for irradiation. The irradiated cells maintain full cytotoxicity. NK-92 are allogeneic (from a donor different from the recipient), but in clinical studies have not been shown to elicit significant host reaction.

Unmodified NK-92 cells lack CD-16, making them unable to perform antibody-dependent cellular cytotoxicity (ADCC); however, the cells have been engineered to express a high affinity Fc-receptor (CD16A, 158V) genetically linked to IL-2 that is bound to the endoplasmic reticulum (ER). These high affinity NK-92 cells can perform ADCC and have greatly expanded therapeutic utility.

NK-92 cells have also been engineered to expressed chimeric antigen receptors (CARs), in an approach similar to that used for T cells. An example of this is an NK-92 derived cell engineered with both a CD16 and an anti-PD-L1 CAR; currently in clinical development for oncology indications. A clinical grade NK-92 variant that expresses a CAR for HER2 (ErbB2) has been generated and is in a clinical study in patients with HER2 positive glioblastoma. Several other clinical grade clones have been generated expressing the CARs for PD-L1, CD19, HER-2, and EGFR. PD-L1 targeted high affinity NK cells have been given to a number of patients with solid tumors in a phase I/II study, which is underway.

=== NKG2D-Fc fusion protein ===
In a study at Boston Children's Hospital, in coordination with Dana–Farber Cancer Institute, in which immunocompromised mice had contracted lymphomas from EBV infection, an NK-activating receptor called NKG2D was fused with a stimulatory Fc portion of the EBV antibody. The NKG2D-Fc fusion proved capable of reducing tumor growth and prolonging survival of the recipients. In a transplantation model of LMP1-fueled lymphomas, the NKG2D-Fc fusion proved capable of reducing tumor growth and prolonging survival of the recipients.

In Hodgkin lymphoma, in which the malignant Hodgkin Reed-Sternberg cells are typically HLA class I deficient, immune evasion is in part mediated by skewing towards an exhausted PD-1hi NK cell phenotype, and re-activation of these NK cells appears to be one mechanism of action induced by checkpoint-blockade.

=== TLR ligands ===
Signaling through TLR can effectively activate NK cell effector functions in vitro and in vivo. TLR ligands are then potentially able to enhance NK cell effector functions during NK cell anti-tumor immunotherapy.

Trastuzumab is a monoclonal anti-HER2 antibody that is used as a treatment of the HER2+ breast cancer. NK cells are an important part of the therapeutical effect of trastuzumab as NK cells recognize the antibody coated cancer cells which induces ADCC (antibody-dependent cellular cytotoxicity) reaction. TLR ligand is used in addition to trastuzumab as a means to enhance its effect. The polysaccharide krestin, which is extracted from Trametes versicolor, is a potent ligand of TLR-2 and so activates NK cells, induces the production of IFNg and enhances the ADCC caused by recognition of trastuzumab-coated cells.

Stimulation of TLR-7 induces the expression of IFN type I and other pro-inflammatory cytokines like IL-1b, IL-6 and IL-12. Mice suffering with NK cell-sensitive lymphoma RMA-S were treated with SC1 molecule. SC1 is novel small-molecule TLR-7 agonist and its repeated administration reportedly activated NK cells in TLR-7- and IFN type I- dependent manner thus reversing the NK cell anergy which ultimately lead to lysis of the tumor.

VTX-2337 is a selective TLR-8 agonist and together with monoclonal antibody cetuximab it was used as a potential therapy for the treatment of recurrent or metastatic SCCHN. Results have shown that the NK cells had become more reactive to the treatment with cetuximab antibody upon pretreatment with VTX-2337. This indicates that the stimulation of TLR-8 and subsequent activation of inflammasome enhances the CD-16 mediated ADCC reaction in patients treated with cetuximab antibody.

NK cells play a role in controlling HIV-1 infection. TLR are potent enhancers of innate antiviral immunity and potentially can reverse HIV-1 latency. Incubation of peripheral blood mononuclear cells with novel potent TLR-9 ligand MGN1703 have resulted in enhancement of NK cell effector functions, thus significantly inhibiting the spread of HIV-1 in culture of autologous CD4+ T-cells. The stimulation of TLR-9 in NK cells induced a strong antiviral innate immune response, an increase in HIV-1 transcription (indicating the reverse in latency of the virus) and it also boosted the NK cell-mediated suppression of HIV-1 infections in autologous CD4+ T cells.

== New findings ==
=== Innate resistance to HIV ===
Recent research suggests specific KIR-MHC class I gene interactions might control innate genetic resistance to certain viral infections, including HIV and its consequent development of AIDS. Certain HLA allotypes have been found to determine the progression of HIV to AIDS; an example is the HLA-B57 and HLA-B27 alleles, which have been found to delay progression from HIV to AIDS. This is evident because patients expressing these HLA alleles are observed to have lower viral loads and a more gradual decline in CD4^{+} T cells numbers. Despite considerable research and data collected measuring the genetic correlation of HLA alleles and KIR allotypes, a firm conclusion has not yet been drawn as to what combination provides decreased HIV and AIDS susceptibility.

NK cells can impose immune pressure on HIV, which had previously been described only for T cells and antibodies. HIV mutates to avoid NK cell detection.

=== Tissue-resident NK cells ===
Most of our current knowledge is derived from investigations of mouse splenic and human peripheral blood NK cells. However, in recent years tissue-resident NK cell populations have been described. These tissue-resident NK cells share transcriptional similarity to tissue-resident memory T cells described previously. However, tissue-resident NK cells are not necessarily of the memory phenotype, and in fact, the majority of the tissue-resident NK cells are functionally immature. These specialized NK-cell subsets can play a role in organ homeostasis. For example, NK cells are enriched in the human liver with a specific phenotype and take part in the control of liver fibrosis. Tissue-resident NK cells have also been identified in sites like bone marrow, spleen and more recently, in lung, intestines and lymph nodes. In these sites, tissue-resident NK cells may act as reservoir for maintaining immature NK cells in humans throughout life.

=== Adaptive NK cells against leukemia targets ===
Natural killer cells are being investigated as an emerging treatment for patients with acute myeloid leukemia (AML), and cytokine-induced memory-like NK cells have shown promise with their enhanced antileukemia functionality. It has been shown that this kind of NK cell has enhanced interferon-γ production and cytotoxicity against leukemia cell lines and primary AML blasts in patients. During a phase 1 clinical trial, five out of nine patients exhibited clinical responses to the treatment, and four patients experienced a complete remission, which suggests that these NK cells have major potential as a successful translational immunotherapy approach for patients with AML in the future.

== See also ==
- Active hexose correlated compound
- Granzymes
- Hematopoiesis
- Immune system
- Interleukin
- Lymphatic system
- List of distinct cell types in the adult human body
