= Antigen presentation =

Vital immune process that is essential for T cell immune response triggering

Antigen presentation stimulates T cells to become either "cytotoxic" CD8+ cells or "helper" CD4+ cells.

Antigen presentation is a vital immune process that is essential for T cell immune response triggering. Because T cells recognize only fragmented antigens displayed on cell surfaces, antigen processing must occur before the antigen fragment can be recognized by a T-cell receptor. Specifically, the fragment, bound to the major histocompatibility complex (MHC), is transported to the surface of the antigen-presenting cell, a process known as presentation. If there has been an infection with viruses or bacteria, the antigen-presenting cell will present an endogenous or exogenous peptide fragment derived from the antigen by MHC molecules. There are two types of MHC molecules which differ in the behaviour of the antigens: MHC class I molecules (MHC-I) bind peptides from the cell cytosol, while peptides generated in the endocytic vesicles after internalisation are bound to MHC class II (MHC-II). Cellular membranes separate these two cellular environments - intracellular and extracellular. Each T cell can only recognize tens to hundreds of copies of a unique sequence of a single peptide among thousands of other peptides presented on the same cell, because an MHC molecule in one cell can bind to quite a large range of peptides. Predicting which (fragments of) antigens will be presented to the immune system by a certain MHC/HLA type is difficult, but the technology involved is improving.

== Presentation of intracellular antigens: Class I ==
Antigen processing and presentation in MHC-I pathway

Cytotoxic T cells (also known as T_{c}, killer T cell, or cytotoxic T-lymphocyte (CTL)) express CD8 co-receptors and are a population of T cells that are specialized for inducing programmed cell death of other cells. Cytotoxic T cells regularly patrol all body cells to maintain the organismal homeostasis. Whenever they encounter signs of disease, caused for example by the presence of viruses or intracellular bacteria or a transformed tumor cell, they initiate processes to destroy the potentially harmful cell. All nucleated cells in the body (along with platelets) display class I major histocompatibility complex (MHC-I molecules). Antigens generated endogenously within these cells are bound to MHC-I molecules and presented on the cell surface. This antigen presentation pathway enables the immune system to detect transformed or infected cells displaying peptides from modified-self (mutated) or foreign proteins.

In the presentation process, these proteins are mainly degraded into small peptides by cytosolic proteases in the proteasome, but there are also other cytoplasmic proteolytic pathways. Then, peptides are distributed to the endoplasmic reticulum (ER) via the action of heat shock proteins and the transporter associated with antigen processing (TAP) which translocates the cytosolic peptides into the ER lumen in an ATP-dependent transport mechanism. There are several ER chaperones involved in MHC-I assembly, such as calnexin, calreticulin, Erp57, protein disulfide isomerase (PDI), and tapasin. Specifically, the complex of TAP, tapasin, MHS Class 1, ERp57, and calreticulin is called the peptide-loading complex (PLC). Peptides are loaded to MHC-I peptide binding groove between two alpha helices at the bottom of the α1 and α2 domains of the MHC class I molecule. After releasing from tapasin, peptide-MHC-I complexes (pMHC-I) exit the ER and are transported to the cell surface by exocytic vesicles.

Naïve anti-viral T cells (CD8+) cannot directly eliminate transformed or infected cells. They have to be activated by the pMHC-I complexes of antigen-presenting cells (APCs). Here, antigen can be presented directly (as described above) or indirectly (cross-presentation) from virus-infected and non-infected cells. After the interaction between pMHC-I and TCR, in presence of co-stimulatory signals and/or cytokines, T cells are activated, migrate to the peripheral tissues and kill the target cells (infected or damaged cells) by inducing cytotoxicity.

Cross-presentation is a special case in which MHC-I molecules are able to present extracellular antigens, usually displayed only by MHC-II molecules. This ability appears in several APCs, mainly plasmacytoid dendritic cells in tissues that stimulate CD8+ T cells directly. This process is essential when APCs are not directly infected, triggering local antiviral and anti-tumor immune responses immediately without trafficking the APCs in the local lymph nodes.

== Presentation of extracellular antigens: Class II ==
MHC II antigen processing pathway A Foreign protein; B Endosome; C Lysosome; D Late endosome/Endolysosome; E ER; F Golgi apparatus; G CLIP for antigen exchange; H Antigen presentation at plasma membrane

Antigens from the extracellular space and sometimes also endogenous ones are enclosed into endocytic vesicles and presented on the cell surface by MHC-II molecules to helper T cells expressing CD4. Only APCs such as dendritic cells, B cells or macrophages express MHC-II molecules on their surface in substantial quantity, so expression of MHC-II molecules is more cell-specific than MHC-I.

APCs usually internalise exogenous antigens by endocytosis, but also by pinocytosis, macroautophagy, endosomal microautophagy, or chaperone-mediated autophagy. In the first case, after internalisation, the antigens are enclosed in vesicles called endosomes. There are three compartments involved in this antigen presentation pathway: early endosomes, late endosomes or endolysosomes, and lysosomes, where antigens are hydrolized by lysosome-associated enzymes (acid-dependent hydrolases, glycosidases, proteases, lipases). This process is favored by gradual reduction of the pH. The main proteases in endosomes are cathepsins and the result is the degradation of the antigens into oligopeptides.

MHC-II molecules are transported from the ER to the MHC class II loading compartment together with the protein invariant chain (Ii, CD74). A non classical MHC-II molecule (HLA-DO and HLA-DM) catalyses the exchange of part of the CD74 (CLIP peptide) with the peptide antigen. Peptide-MHC-II complexes (pMHC-II) are transported to the plasma membrane and the processed antigen is presented to the helper T cells in the lymph nodes.

APCs undergo a process of maturation while migrating, via chemotactic signals, to lymphoid tissues, in which they lose the phagocytic capacity and develop an increased ability to communicate with T-cells by antigen-presentation. As well as in CD8+ cytotoxic T cells, APCs need pMHC-II and additional costimulatory signals to fully activate naive T helper cells.

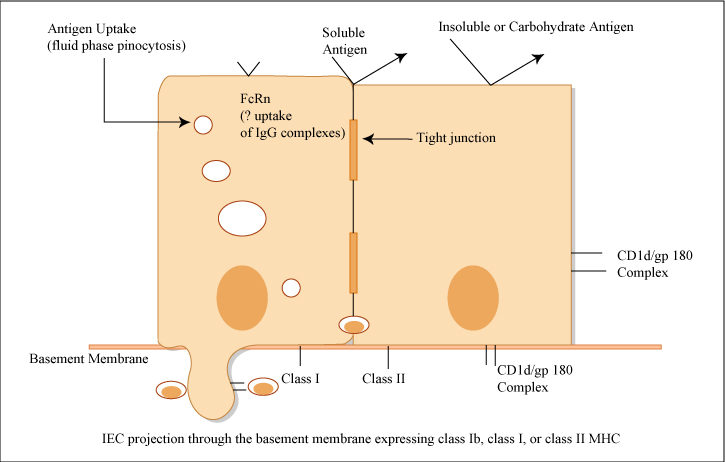
Antigen presentation by absorptive epithelial cell.

Alternative pathway of endogenous antigen processing and presentation over MHC-II molecules exists in medullary thymic epithelial cells (mTEC) via the process of autophagy. It is important for the process of central tolerance of T cells in particular the negative selection of autoreactive clones. Random gene expression of the whole genome is achieved via the action of AIRE and a self-digestion of the expressed molecules presented on both MHC-I and MHC-II molecules.

== Presentation of native intact antigens to B cells ==
B-cell receptors on the surface of B cells bind to intact native and undigested antigens of a structural nature, rather than to a linear sequence of a peptide which has been digested into small fragments and presented by MHC molecules. Large complexes of intact antigen are presented in lymph nodes to B cells by follicular dendritic cells in the form of immune complexes. Some APCs expressing comparatively lower levels of lysosomal enzymes are thus less likely to digest the antigen they have captured before presenting it to B cells.

== See also ==
- Immune system
- Immunology
- Immunological synapse
- Trogocytosis
