= Antigen processing =

Immunological process

Antigen processing, or the cytosolic pathway, is an immunological process that prepares antigens for presentation to special cells of the immune system called T lymphocytes. It is considered to be a stage of antigen presentation pathways. This process involves two distinct pathways for processing of antigens from an organism's own (self) proteins or intracellular pathogens (e.g. viruses), or from phagocytosed pathogens (e.g. bacteria); subsequent presentation of these antigens on class I or class II major histocompatibility complex (MHC) molecules is dependent on which pathway is used. Both MHC class I and II are required to bind antigens before they are stably expressed on a cell surface. MHC I antigen presentation typically (considering cross-presentation) involves the endogenous pathway of antigen processing, and MHC II antigen presentation involves the exogenous pathway of antigen processing. Cross-presentation involves parts of the exogenous and the endogenous pathways but ultimately involves the latter portion of the endogenous pathway (e.g. proteolysis of antigens for binding to MHC I molecules).

While the joint distinction between the two pathways is useful, there are instances where extracellular-derived peptides are presented in the context of MHC class I and cytosolic peptides are presented in the context of MHC class II (this often happens in dendritic cells).

== The endogenous pathway ==
The endogenous pathway is used to present cellular peptide fragments on the cell surface on MHC class I molecules. If a virus had infected the cell, viral peptides would also be presented, allowing the immune system to recognize and kill the infected cell. Worn out proteins within the cell become ubiquitinated, marking them for proteasome degradation. Proteasomes break the protein up into peptides that include some around nine amino acids long (suitable for fitting within the peptide binding cleft of MHC class I molecules). Transporter associated with antigen processing (TAP), a protein that spans the membrane of the rough endoplasmic reticulum, transports the peptides into the lumen of the rough endoplasmic reticulum (ER). Also within the rough ER, a series of chaperone proteins, including calnexin, calreticulin, ERp57, and Binding immunoglobulin protein (BiP) facilitates the proper folding of class I MHC and its association with β2 microglobulin. The partially folded MHC class I molecule then interacts with TAP via tapasin (the complete complex also contains calreticulin and Erp57 and, in mice, calnexin). Once the peptide is transported into the ER lumen it binds to the cleft of the awaiting MHC class I molecule, stabilizing the MHC and allowing it to be transported to the cell surface by the golgi apparatus.

== The exogenous pathway ==
The exogenous pathway is utilized by specialized antigen-presenting cells to present peptides derived from proteins that the cell has endocytosed. The peptides are presented on MHC class II molecules. Proteins are endocytosed and degraded by acid-dependent proteases in endosomes; this process takes about an hour.

The nascent MHC class II protein in the rough ER has its peptide-binding cleft blocked by Ii (the invariant chain; a trimer) to prevent it from binding cellular peptides or peptides from the endogenous pathway. The invariant chain also facilitates MHC class II's export from the ER in a vesicle. This fuses with a late endosome containing the endocytosed, degraded proteins. The invariant chain is then broken down in stages, leaving only a small fragment called "Class II-associated invariant chain peptide" (CLIP) which still blocks the peptide binding cleft. An MHC class II-like structure, HLA-DM, removes CLIP and replaces it with a peptide from the endosome. The stable MHC class-II is then presented on the cell surface.

== Cross-presentation processing ==
In Cross-presentation, peptides derived from extracellular proteins are presented in the context of MHC class I. The cell starts off with the exogenous pathways but diverts the antigens (cytosolic diversion) to the endogenous pathway. This can allow the cell to skip the parts of the endogenous pathway that involve synthesis of antigens from the antigenic genes with cellular machinery upon infection, because the endogenous pathway can involve infection before being able to present antigens with MHC I, and cross-presentation saves them the effort needed for that and allows the professional antigen-presenting cells (dendritic cells) to process and present antigens without getting infected, which does not tend to happen to dendritic cells and is quite common scenario of antigen-processing using the endogenous pathway. Not all antigen-presenting cells utilize cross-presentation.

== Viral evasion of antigen processing ==
Certain species in the Cytolomegavirus family can cause the infected cell to produce proteins like US2, 3, 6, and/or 11. US11 and US2 mislead MHC I to the cytoplasm; US3 inhibits the transportation of MHC I in the ER (a part of the endogenous pathway and cross-presentation); US6 blocks peptide transportation by TAP to MHC I.

Mycobacterium tuberculosis inhibits phagosome-endosome fusion, thus avoiding being destroyed by the harsh environment of the phagosome.

ICP47 from some herpesvirus block transport of the peptide by TAP. U21 from some human herpesvirus 7 binds and targets certain MHC I molecules for lysosomal degradation.

E19 from some adenoviruses block the movement of MHC I to the proper locations for the endogenous pathway.

Nef from some HIV strains enhance the movement of MHC molecules back into the cytoplasm, preventing them from presenting antigens.

== The role of Langerhans' dendritic cells in antigen processing ==
Langerhans' cells are particular type of dendritic cells present in non lymphoid tissues together with interstitial cells. When these cells (in an immature state) come in contact with antigenic cells or disease causing viruses etc. these cells produce an inflammatory stimulus and start antigen processing and move toward lymph nodes where these APCs present antigen to mature T lymphocytes.

T-dependent antigen – Antigens that require the assistance of T cells to induce the formation of specific antibodies. T-independent antigen – Antigens that stimulate B cells directly.

== B-cell activation with B-T cell interactions ==
Lymphocytes are one of the five kinds of white blood cells or leukocytes, circulating in the blood. Although mature lymphocytes all look pretty much alike, they are diverse in their functions. The most abundant lymphocytes are:

- B lymphocytes (often simply called B cells)
- T lymphocytes (likewise called T cells)

B cells are produced in the bone marrow. The precursors of T cells are also produced in the bone marrow but leave the bone marrow and mature in the thymus (which accounts for their designation). Each B cell and T cell is specific for a particular antigen, which simply means that each of these cells is able to bind to a particular molecular structure (such as an antigen). The specificity of binding resides in a specific receptor for antigen: the B-cell receptor (BCR) and the T-cell receptor (TCR) for B and T cells, respectively. Both BCRs and TCRs share these properties:

- They are integral membrane proteins.
- They are present in thousands of identical copies exposed at the cell surface.
- They are made before the cell ever encounters an antigen.
- They are encoded by genes assembled by the recombination of segments of DNA.

=== How antigen receptor diversity is generated ===
Each receptor has a unique binding site. This site binds to a portion of the antigen called an antigenic determinant or epitope. The binding, like that between an enzyme and its substrate, depends on complementarity of the surface of the receptor and the surface of the epitope and occurs mainly by non-covalent forces. Successful binding of the antigen receptor to the epitope, if accompanied by additional signals, results in:

1. Stimulation of the cell to leave G_{0} and enter the cell cycle.
2. Repeated mitosis leads to the development of a clone of cells bearing the same antigen receptor; that is, a clone of cells of the identical specificity. BCRs and TCRs differ in:
- their structure
- the genes that encode them
- the type of epitope to which they bind

=== B cells ===
BCRs bind intact antigens (like diphtheria toxoid, the protein introduced in the diphtheria-tetanus-pertussis vaccine). These may be soluble molecules present in the extracellular fluid; or intact molecules that the B cell plucks from the surface of antigen-presenting cells like macrophages and dendritic cells. The bound antigen molecules are engulfed into the B cell by receptor-mediated endocytosis. The antigen is digested into peptide fragments by various proteasomes and is then displayed at the cell surface attached along with a class II histocompatibility molecule. Helper T cells specific for this structure (i.e., with complementary TCRs) bind this B cell and secrete lymphokines that:

1. Stimulate the B cell to enter the cell cycle
2. The B cell undergoes repeated mitotic cell division, resulting in a clone of cells with identical BCRs;
3. The B cells switch from synthesizing their BCRs as integral membrane proteins to a soluble version;
4. The clonal cells differentiate into plasma cells that secrete these soluble BCRs, which we now call antibodies

=== T cells ===
There are two types of T cells that differ in their TCR:

1. alpha/beta (αβ) T cells: Their TCR is a heterodimer of an alpha chain with a beta chain. Each chain has a variable (V) region and a constant (C) region. The V regions each contain 3 hypervariable regions that make up the antigen-binding site.
2. gamma/delta (γδ) T cells: Their TCR is also a heterodimer of a gamma chain paired with a delta chain. They show characteristics of both innate immune response and acquired immune response; hence, regarded as the bridging between the two immune systems.

The discussion that follows now concerns alpha/beta T cells. The TCR (of αβ T-cells) binds a bimolecular complex displayed at the surface of some other cells called an antigen-presenting cell (APC). This complex consists of: a fragment of an antigen lying within the groove of a histocompatibility molecule. The complex has been compared to a "hot dog in a bun".

== See also ==
- Major histocompatibility complex (MHC)
- T cell
- Cross-presentation
- Antigen-presenting cell
- Antigen presentation
- Polyclonal response
