= Peptide-loading complex =

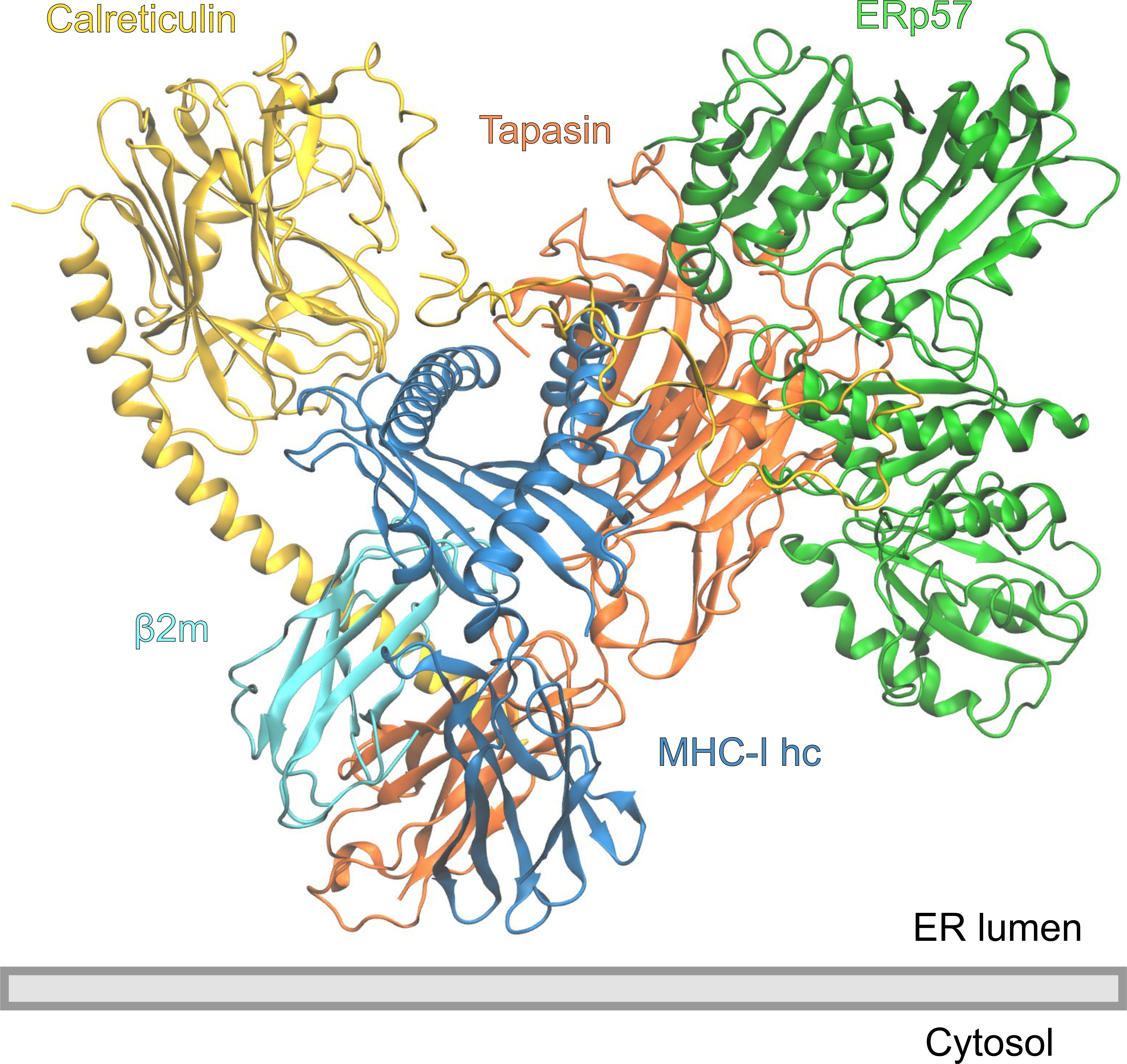
PLC side view

The peptide-loading complex (PLC) is a short-lived, multisubunit membrane protein complex that is located in the endoplasmic reticulum (ER). It orchestrates peptide translocation and selection by major histocompatibility complex class I (MHC-I) molecules. Stable peptide-MHC I complexes are released to the cell surface to promote T-cell response against malignant or infected cells. In turn, T-cells recognize the activated peptides, which could be immunogenic or non-immunogenic.

== Overview ==
A PLC assembly consists of seven subunits, including the transporters associated with antigen processing (TAP1 and TAP2 – jointly referred to as TAP), the oxidoreductase ERp57, the MHC-I heterodimer, and the chaperones tapasin and calreticulin. TAP transports proteasomal degradation products from the cytosol into the lumen of the ER, where they are loaded onto MHC-I molecules. The peptide-MHC-I complexes then move via a secretory pathway to the cell surface, presenting their antigenic load to cytotoxic T-cells.

In general, preliminary MHC-I heavy chains are chaperoned by the calnexin–calreticulin system in the ER. Together with β2-microglobulin (β2m), MHC-I heavy chains form assemblies of heterodimers that act as receptors for antigenic peptides. Empty MHC-I heterodimers are recruited by calreticulin and form short-lived macromolecular PLC where the chaperone tapasin further provides stabilization in the MHC-I molecules. Furthermore, ERp57 and tapasin form disulfide-linked conjugates, and tapasin is crucial for maintaining the structural stability of the PLC as well as facilitating optimal peptide loading. After final quality control, during which MHC-I heterodimers undergo peptide editing, stable peptide–MHC-I complexes are released to the cell surface for T-cell recognition. The PLC can serve a large variety of MHC-I allomorphs, thus playing a central role in the differentiation and priming of T lymphocytes, and in controlling viral infections and tumour development.

== Structure ==
The structure of the human PLC has been determined using single-particle electron cryo-microscopy (cryo-EM). The PLC, measuring 150 Å by 150 Å and with a total height of 240 Å, is organized around the Transporter associated with Antigen Processing (TAP). It includes molecules such as tapasin, calreticulin, ERp57, and Major Histocompatibility Complex class I (MHC-I), arranged in a pseudo-symmetric pattern.

=== TAP ===
TAP is a heterodimeric complex, consisting of TAP1 (ABCB2) and TAP2 (ABCB3) members of the ABC transporter superfamily. The common feature of all ABC transporters is their organization: 1) into two transmembrane domains (TMDs) and 2) into two nucleotide-binding domains (NBDs). Both intramolecular domains are coupled to each other and when ATP binding is in progress, conformational changes in the TMDs allow proteasomal degradation products to move across the membrane. TAP recognizes and transports the antigen peptides produced in the cytosol straight into the ER, while tapasin recognizes the kind of peptides that have the ability to form stable complexes with MHC-I. This process is known as peptide proofreading or editing. Peptides selected through proofreading improve MHC-I stability; tapasin also contributes to the editing of immunogenic peptide epitopes. However, only lately it was proven via biochemical, biophysical, and structural studies that a key function in adaptive immunity, the catalytic mechanism of peptide proofreading, is performed by tapasin and TAPBPR (TAP-binding protein-related, a tapasin homologue).

=== Tapasin ===
Cresswell and co-workers first discovered tapasin (TAP-associated glycoprotein) as a 48 kDa protein in complexes isolated with TAP1 antibodies from digitonin lysates of human B lymphoblastoid cells. Tapasin binds HC/β2m along with ER chaperones to the peptide transporter. It is located in the ER and its function comprises holding together class I molecules jointly with the chaperone calreticulin and the ERp57 to TAP. Studies of a tapasin-deficient cell line and from mice bearing a disrupted tapasin gene, the short-lived complex of class I molecules.

Tapasin and TAP are very important for the stabilization of the class I molecules and also for the optimization of the peptide presented to cytotoxic T cells. A PLC-independent tapasin homologue protein named TAPBPR was found that has the ability to act as a second MHC-I specific peptide proofreader or editor, but does not possess a transmembrane domain. Tapasin and TAPBPR share similar binding interfaces on MHC-I, as shown with the X-ray structure of TAPBPR with MHC-I (heavy chain and β2 microglobulin). The use of a photo-cleavable high-affinity peptide allowed researchers to form a stable (bound) MHC-I molecules and afterwards to form a stable TAPBPR and MHC-I complex with cleavage by UV light of the photoinduced peptide.

=== ERp57 ===
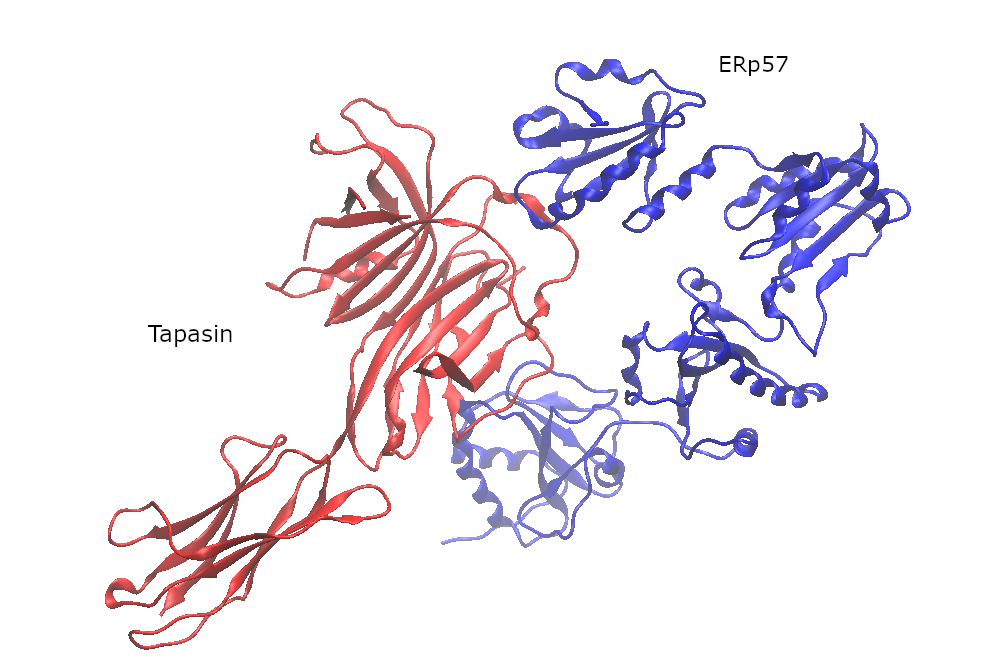
Crystal structure of Tapasin-ERp57 complex

ERp57 is an enzyme of the thiol oxidoreductase family located in the ER. It is attached to substrates in an indirect fashion through association with the molecular chaperone calreticulin of the peptide-loading complex, In early stages of generation of MHC-I molecules, ERp57 is associated with free MHC-I heavy chains. As a result, its function is determined by the formation of disulfide bonds in heavy chains, by oxidative folding of the heavy chain, and finally by the fact that ERp57 is loading the peptides onto MHC-I molecules.

=== MHC-I ===
MHC-I heavy chains may work as chaperones with the aid of the calnexin-calreticulin complex in the ER. In addition to this, β2-microglobulin (β2m) is attached to the heavy chains of the heterodimers and as a whole they act as receptors for antigenic peptides. When MHC-I chains are empty, they are recruited by calreticulin and form a transient PLC.

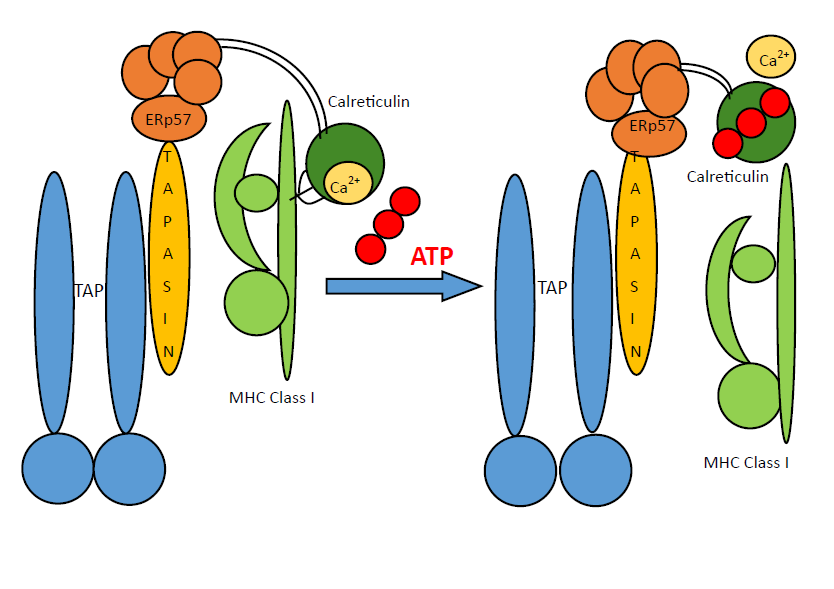
Release of MHC-I from PLC

Tapasin regularly plays a role in the stabilization of MHC-I. Only after MHC-I heterodimers are deployed for peptide proofreading or editing, stable pMHC-I (peptide-MHC-I) complexes are released to the cell surface for recognition and destruction of virus-infected or malignantly neoplastic cells. In general, each individual organism owns a collection of six MHC-I molecules (three from each parent). Thus, in autoimmune emergencies, compatible donors are relatives who own a similar collection of MHC-I molecules, apart from those of the recipient.

=== Calreticulin ===
Calreticulin – especially its lectin-like domain – interacts with MHC-I. The P domain faces the MHC-I peptide-binding site towards ERp57. This orientation makes it possible for tapasin to attach and secure MHC-I. This translocation of TAP facilitates its opening out into an ER luminal cavity, edged by standard membrane entry points such as those for tapasin and MHC-I. These two entry points facilitate the recruitment of MHC-I with optimal peptide loading and eventual release of MHC-I in T-cell surfaces for recognition.
