= Cross-presentation =

Cellular process

Cross-presentation is the ability of certain professional antigen-presenting cells (mostly dendritic cells) to take up, process and present extracellular antigens with MHC class I molecules to CD8 T cells (cytotoxic T cells). Cross-priming, the result of this process, describes the stimulation of naive cytotoxic CD8^{+} T cells into activated cytotoxic CD8^{+} T cells. This process is necessary for immunity against most tumors and against viruses that infect dendritic cells and sabotage their presentation of virus antigens. Cross presentation is also required for the induction of cytotoxic immunity by vaccination with protein antigens, for example, tumour vaccination.

Cross-presentation is of particular importance, because it permits the presentation of exogenous antigens, which are normally presented by MHC II on the surface of dendritic cells, to also be presented through the MHC I pathway. The MHC I pathway is normally used to present endogenous antigens that have infected a particular cell. However, cross presenting cells are able to utilize the MHC I pathway to present exogenous antigens (ones not from the cell itself) to trigger an adaptive immune response by activating cytotoxic CD8+ T cells recognizing the exogenous antigens on the MHC class I complexes.

== History ==
The first evidence of cross-presentation was reported in 1976 by Michael J. Bevan after injection of grafted cells carrying foreign minor histocompatibility (MiHA) molecules. This resulted in a CD8+ T cell response induced by antigen-presenting cells of the recipient against the foreign MiHA cells. Because of this, Bevan implied that these antigen presenting cells must have engulfed and cross presented these foreign MiHA cells to host cytotoxic CD8+ cells, thus triggering an adaptive immune response against the grafted tissue. This observation was termed "cross-priming".

Later, there had been much controversy about cross-presentation, which now is believed to have been due to particularities and limitations of some experimental systems used.

== Cross-presenting cells ==
The primary and most efficient cross-presenting cells are dendritic cells, though macrophages, B lymphocytes and sinusoidal endothelial cells have also been observed to cross present antigens in vivo and in vitro. However, in vivo dendritic cells have been found to be the most efficient and common antigen presenting cells to cross present antigens in MHC I molecules. There are two dendritic cells subtypes; plasmacytoid (pDC) and myeloid (mDC) dendritic cells. pDCs are found within the blood and are able to cross present antigens directly or from neighboring apoptotic cells, but the main physiological significance of pDCs is the secretion of type I IFN in response to viral infections. mDCs are categorized as migratory DCs, resident DCs, Langerhans cells, and inflammatory dendritic cells. All mDCs have specialized functions and secretory factors, but they are all still able to cross present antigens in order to activate cytotoxic CD8+ T cells.

There are many factors that determine cross presentation function such as antigen uptake and processing mechanism, as well as environmental signals and activation of cross presenting dendritic cells. The activation of cross presenting dendritic cells is dependent on stimulation by CD4+ T helper cells. The co-stimulatory molecule CD40/CD40L along with the danger presence of an exogenous antigen are catalysts for dendritic cell licensing, and thus the cross presentation and activation of naive CD8+ cytotoxic T cells.

== Vacuolar and cytosolic diversion ==
In addition to solid structure uptake, dendritic cell phagocytosis simultaneously modifies the kinetics of endosomal trafficking and maturation. As a consequence, external soluble antigens are targeted into the MHC class I cross-presentation pathway instead of the MHC Class II pathway. However, there is still uncertainty in regard to a mechanistic pathway for cross presentation within an antigen presenting cell. Currently, there are two main pathways proposed, cytosolic and vacuolar.

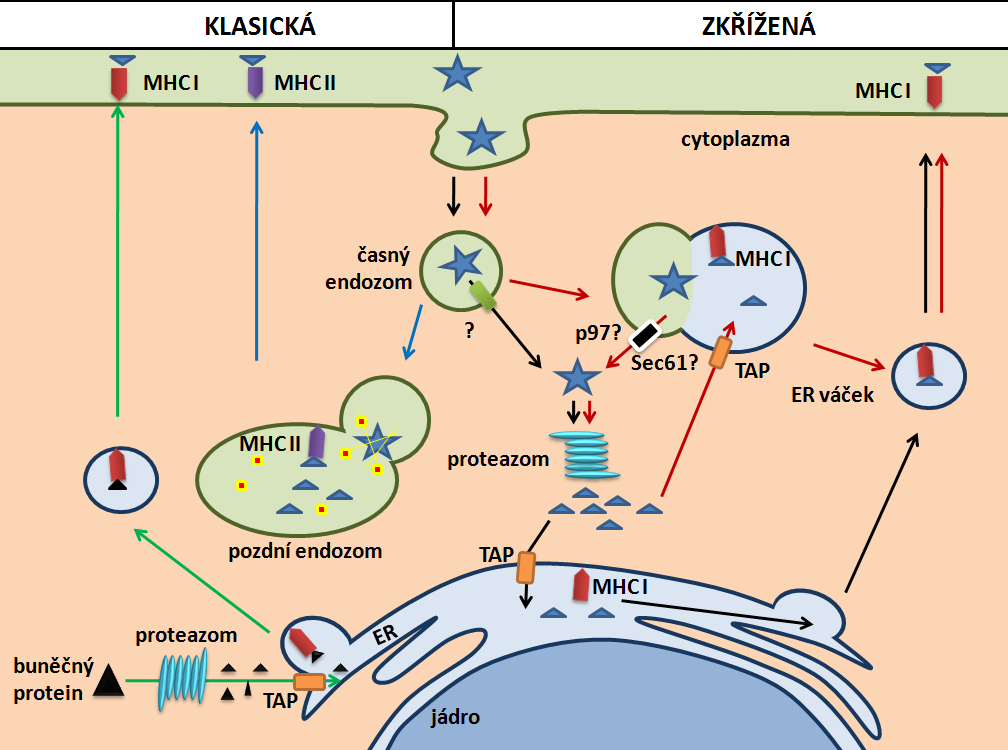
Mechanism of cross-presentation (in Czech)

The vacuolar pathway is initiated through the endocytosis of an extracellular antigen by a dendritic cell. Endocytosis results in the formation of a phagocytic vesicle, where an increasingly acidic environment along with the activation of enzymes such as lysosomal proteases triggers the degradation of antigen into peptides. The peptides can then be loaded onto MHC I binding grooves within the phagosome. It is unclear whether the MHC I molecule is being exported from the endoplasmic reticulum before peptide loading, or is being recycled from the cell membrane prior to peptide loading. Once the exogenous antigen peptide is loaded onto the MHC class I molecule, the complex is exported to the cell surface for antigen cross presentation.

There is also evidence that suggest that cross-presentation requires a separate pathway in a proportion of CD8(+) dendritic cells that are able to cross-present. This pathway is called the cytosolic diversion pathway. Similarly to the vacuolar pathway, antigens are taken into the cell through endocytosis. Antigen proteins are transported out of this compartment into the cytoplasm by unknown mechanisms. Within the cytoplasm, exogenous antigens are processed by the proteasome and degraded into peptides. These processed peptides can either be transported by the TAP transporter into the endoplasmic reticulum (ER), or back into the same endosome for loading onto MHC class I complexes. It is believed that MHC I loading occurs both in the ER as well as phagocytic vesicles such as an endosome in the cytosolic pathway. For MHC class I loading within the ER, exogenous antigen peptides are loaded onto MHC class I molecules with the help of the peptide loading complex and chaperone proteins such as beta-2 microglobulin, ERAP, tapasin, and calreticulin. After antigen peptide loading, the MHC molecule is transported out of the ER, through the Golgi complex, and then onto the cell surface for cross presentation.

It appears that both pathways are able to occur within an antigen-presenting cell, and may be influenced by environmental factors such as proteasome and phagocytic inhibitors.

== Relevance for immunity ==
Cross-presentation has been shown to play a role in the immune defense against many viruses (herpesvirus, influenzavirus, CMV, EBV, SIV, papillomavirus, and others), bacteria (listeria, salmonella, E. coli, M. tuberculosis, and others) and tumors (brain, pancreas, melanoma, leukemia, and others). Even though many viruses can inhibit and degrade dendritic cell activity, cross-presenting dendritic cells that are unaffected by the virus are able to intake the infected peripheral cell and still cross present the exogenous antigen to cytotoxic T cells. The action of cross priming can bolster immunity against antigens that target intracellular peripheral tissues that are unable to be mediated by antibodies produced through B cells. Also, cross-priming avoids viral immune evasion strategies, such as suppression of antigen processing. Consequently, immune responses against viruses that are able to do so, such as herpes viruses, are largely dependent on cross-presentation for a successful immune response. Overall, cross presentation aids in facilitating an adaptive immune response against intracellular viruses and tumor cells.

Dendritic cell-dependent cross-presentation also has implications for cancer immunotherapy vaccines. The injection of anti-tumor specific vaccines can be targeted to specific dendritic cell subsets within peripheral skin tissues, such as migratory dendritic cells and Langerhans cells. After vaccine induced activation, dendritic cells are able to migrate to lymph nodes and activate CD4+ T helper cells as well as cross prime CD8+ T cytotoxic cells. This mass generation of activated tumor specific CD8+ T cells increases anti-tumor immunity, and is also able to overcome many of the immune suppressive effects of tumor cells.

== Relevance for immune tolerance ==
Cross-presenting dendritic cells have a significant impact on the promotion of central and peripheral immune tolerance. In central tolerance, dendritic cells are present within the thymus, or the location of T cell development and maturation. Thymic dendritic cells can intake dead medullary thymic epithelial cells, and cross present "self" peptides on MHC class I as a negative selection check on cytotoxic T cells that have a high affinity for self peptides. Presentation of tissue specific antigens is initiated by medullary thymic epithelial cells (mTEC), but is reinforced by thymic dendritic cells after expression of AIRE and engulfment of mTECs. Although the function of dendritic cells in central tolerance is still relatively unknown, it appears that thymic dendritic cells act as a complement to mTECs during negative selection of T cells.

In regard to peripheral tolerance, peripheral tissue resting dendritic cells are able to promote self tolerance against cytotoxic T cells that have an affinity for self peptides. They can present tissue specific antigens within the lymph node in order to regulate T cytotoxic cells from initiating an adaptive immune response, as well as regulate T cytotoxic cells that have a high affinity for self tissues, but were still able to escape central tolerance. Cross-presenting DCs are able to induce anergy, apoptosis, or T regulatory states for high self affinity T cytotoxic cells. This has large implications for defense against auto immune disorders and regulation of self specific cytotoxic T cells.
