= PDIA3 =

Protein-coding gene in the species Homo sapiens

Identifiers
- Aliases: PDIA3, protein disulfide isomerase family A, member 3, ER60, ERp57, ERp60, ERp61, GRP57, GRP58, HEL-S-269, HEL-S-93n, HsT17083, P58, PI-PLC, protein disulfide isomerase family A member 3
- External IDs: OMIM: 602046; MGI: 95834; GeneCards: PDIA3
Available structures
PDB	Ortholog search: PDBe RCSB
PDB	List of PDB id codes 2ALB, 2DMM, 2H8L, 3F8U
Enzyme activity
EC #	BRENDA	ExPASy	KEGG	MetaCyc
5.3.4.1	↗	↗	↗	↗

Gene location (Human)
Chr.	Chromosome 15 (human)
Band	15q15.3	Start	43,746,394 bp
Band	15q15.3	End	43,773,279 bp

Gene location (Mouse)
Chr.	Chromosome 2 (mouse)
Band	2 E5|2 60.38 cM	Start	121,244,256 bp
Band	2 E5|2 60.38 cM	End	121,269,168 bp
RNA expression pattern
Bgee	Human / Mouse (ortholog); Top expressed in: corpus epididymis; stromal cell of endometrium; caput epididymis; beta cell; left lobe of thyroid gland; right lobe of thyroid gland; anterior pituitary; smooth muscle tissue; mucosa of sigmoid colon; rectum / Top expressed in: seminal vesicula; decidua; molar; dermis; mandibular prominence; calvaria; maxillary prominence; stroma of bone marrow; abdominal wall; migratory enteric neural crest cell; More reference expression data
BioGPS	n/a
Gene ontology
Molecular function	disulfide oxidoreductase activity; isomerase activity; protein binding; phospholipase C activity; cysteine-type endopeptidase activity; RNA binding; protein disulfide isomerase activity; identical protein binding
Cellular component	endoplasmic reticulum lumen; focal adhesion; melanosome; myelin sheath; cell surface; endoplasmic reticulum; extracellular exosome; nucleus; phagocytic vesicle; recycling endosome membrane; extracellular space; MHC class I peptide loading complex
Biological process	protein import into nucleus; antigen processing and presentation of peptide antigen via MHC class I; protein folding in endoplasmic reticulum; cell redox homeostasis; response to endoplasmic reticulum stress; protein retention in ER lumen; protein folding; positive regulation of extrinsic apoptotic signaling pathway; signal transduction; proteolysis; antigen processing and presentation of exogenous peptide antigen via MHC class I, TAP-dependent; cellular response to interleukin-7
Sources:Amigo / QuickGO
Orthologs
Databases	NCBI: entry; OMA: entry
Species	Human	Mouse
Entrez	2923	14827
Ensembl	ENSG00000167004	ENSMUSG00000027248
UniProt	P30101	P27773
RefSeq (mRNA)	NM_005313	NM_007952
RefSeq (protein)	NP_005304	NP_031978
Location (UCSC)	Chr 15: 43.75 – 43.77 Mb	Chr 2: 121.24 – 121.27 Mb
PubMed search
- Wikidata
View/Edit Human	View/Edit Mouse

Protein disulfide-isomerase A3 (PDIA3), also known as glucose-regulated protein, 58-kD (GRP58), is an isomerase enzyme encoded by the autosomal gene PDIA3 in humans. This protein localizes to the endoplasmic reticulum (ER) and interacts with lectin chaperones calreticulin and calnexin (CNX) to modulate folding of newly synthesized glycoproteins. It is thought that complexes of lectins and this protein mediate protein folding by promoting formation of disulfide bonds in their glycoprotein substrates.

== Structure ==
The PDIA3 protein consists of four thioredoxin-like domains: a, b, b′, and a′. The a and a′ domains have Cys-Gly-His-Cys active site motifs (C57-G58-H59-C60 and C406-G407-H408-C409) and are catalytically active. The bb′ domains contain a CNX binding site, which is composed of positively charged, highly conserved residues (K214, K274, and R282) that interact with the negatively charged residues of the CNX P domain. The b′ domain comprises the majority of the binding site, but the β4-β5 loop of the b domain provides additional contact (K214) to strengthen the interaction. A transient disulfide bond forms between the N-terminal cysteine in the catalytic motif and a substrate, but in a step called "escape pathway", the bond is disrupted as the C-terminal cysteine attacks the N-terminal cysteine to release the substrate.

== Function ==
The PDIA3 protein is a thiol oxidoreductase that has protein disulfide isomerase activity. PDIA3 is also part of the major histocompatibility complex (MHC) class I peptide loading complex, which is essential for formation of the final antigen conformation and export from the endoplasmic reticulum to the cell surface. This protein of the endoplasmic reticulum interacts with lectin chaperones such as calreticulin and CNX in order to modulate the folding of proteins that are newly synthesized. It is believed that PDIA3 plays a role in protein folding by promoting the formation of disulfide bonds, and that CNX facilitates the positioning substrates next to the catalytic cysteines. This function allows it to serve as a redox sensor by activating mTORC1, which then mediates mTOR complex assembly to adapt cells to oxidative damage. Thus, PDIA3 regulates cell growth and death according to oxygen concentrations, such as in the hypoxic microenvironment of bones. Additionally, PDIA3 activates cell anchorage in bones by associating with cell division and cytoskeleton proteins, such as beta-actin and vimentin, to form a complex which controls TUBB3 folding and proper attachment of the microtubules to the kinetochore. PDIA3 also plays a role in cytokine-dependent signal transduction, including STAT3 signaling.

PDIA3 may also participate in Vitamin D (specifically, calcitriol) signaling as a membrane-bound receptor.

== Clinical significance ==
It has been demonstrated that the downregulation of ERp57 expression is correlated with poor prognosis in early-stage cervical cancer. It has also been demonstrated that ERp57/PDIA3 binds specific DNA fragments in a melanoma cell line. PDIA3 is also involved in bone metastasis, which is the most common source of distant relapse in breast cancer. In addition to cancer, overexpression of PDIA3 is linked to renal fibrosis, which is characterized by excess synthesis and secretion of ECM leading to ER stress.

== Interactions ==
It has been demonstrated that PDIA3 interacts with:

- BACE1,
- ERp27,
- tapasin,
- CRT, and
- CNX.

== See also ==
- Antigen processing
- Major histocompatibility complex
