= HLA-F =

Protein-coding gene in the species Homo sapiens

Identifiers
- Aliases: HLA-F, CDA12, HLA-5.4, HLA-CDA12, major histocompatibility complex, class I, F
- External IDs: OMIM: 143110; MGI: 3647514; GeneCards: HLA-F

Gene location (Human)
Chr.	Chromosome 6 (human)
Band	6p22.1	Start	29,722,775 bp
Band	6p22.1	End	29,738,528 bp
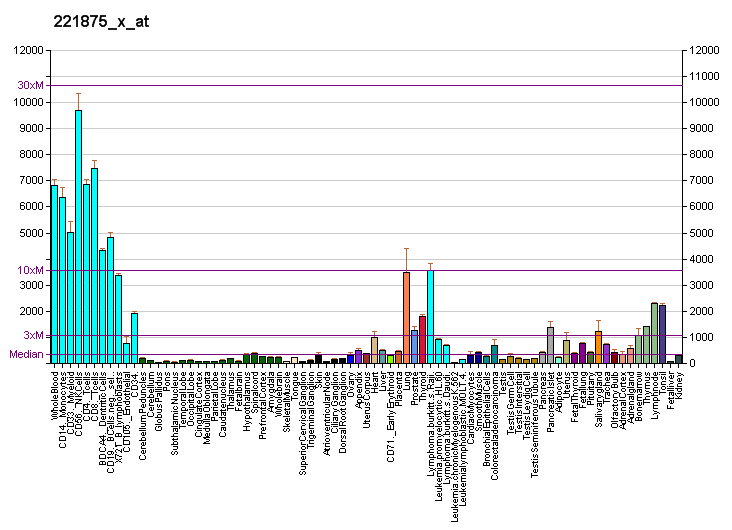

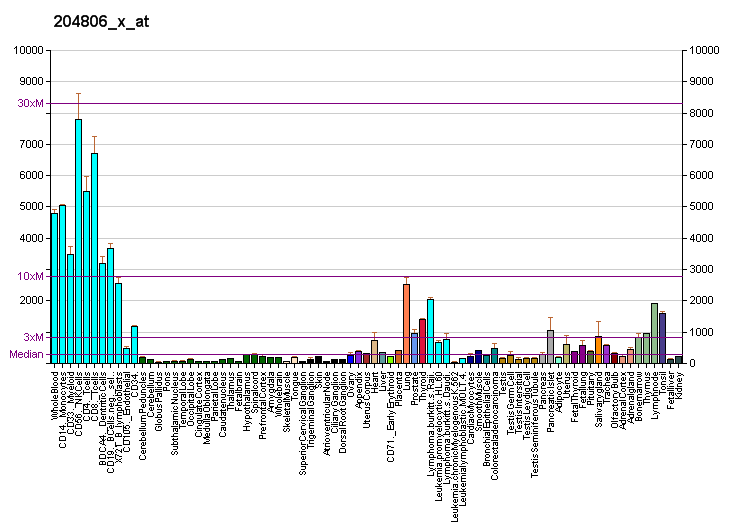
RNA expression pattern
Bgee	Human / Mouse (ortholog); Top expressed in: granulocyte; spleen; blood; lymph node; appendix; monocyte; right lung; duodenum; upper lobe of left lung; bone marrow cell / n/a; More reference expression data
BioGPS	More reference expression data
Gene ontology
Molecular function	TAP2 binding; TAP1 binding; signaling receptor binding; peptide antigen binding; protein binding; beta-2-microglobulin binding; 14-3-3 protein binding
Cellular component	integral component of membrane; phagocytic vesicle membrane; early endosome membrane; membrane; Golgi membrane; plasma membrane; cell surface; endoplasmic reticulum; MHC class I protein complex; ER to Golgi transport vesicle membrane; integral component of lumenal side of endoplasmic reticulum membrane; recycling endosome membrane; extracellular space; lysosome; lysosomal membrane; endosome; external side of plasma membrane; MHC class Ib protein complex
Biological process	antigen processing and presentation of exogenous peptide antigen via MHC class I, TAP-dependent; interferon-gamma-mediated signaling pathway; immune system process; antigen processing and presentation of peptide antigen via MHC class I; antigen processing and presentation of exogenous peptide antigen via MHC class I, TAP-independent; type I interferon signaling pathway; regulation of immune response; positive regulation of T cell mediated cytotoxicity; antigen processing and presentation of endogenous peptide antigen via MHC class Ib; immune response; antigen processing and presentation of exogenous peptide antigen via MHC class Ib; antigen processing and presentation of endogenous peptide antigen via MHC class I via ER pathway, TAP-independent; negative regulation of T cell cytokine production; negative regulation of natural killer cell cytokine production; positive regulation of natural killer cell cytokine production; negative regulation of natural killer cell degranulation; positive regulation of natural killer cell degranulation; negative regulation of natural killer cell mediated cytotoxicity; negative regulation of neuron death
Sources:Amigo / QuickGO
Orthologs
Databases	NCBI: entry; OMA: entry
Species	Human	Mouse
Entrez	3134	630294
Ensembl	ENSG00000229698; ENSG00000237508; ENSG00000234487; ENSG00000206509; ENSG00000137403 ENSG00000235220; ENSG00000204642	n/a
UniProt	P30511	Q0WXH6
RefSeq (mRNA)	NM_001098478; NM_001098479; NM_018950	NM_001177467
RefSeq (protein)	NP_001091948; NP_001091949; NP_061823	NP_001170938
Location (UCSC)	Chr 6: 29.72 – 29.74 Mb	n/a
PubMed search
- Wikidata
View/Edit Human	View/Edit Mouse

HLA class I histocompatibility antigen, alpha chain F is a protein that in humans is encoded by the HLA-F gene. It is an empty intracellular molecule that encodes a non-classical heavy chain anchored to the membrane and forming a heterodimer with a β-2 microglobulin light chain. It belongs to the HLA class I heavy chain paralogues that separate from most of the HLA heavy chains. HLA-F is localized in the endoplasmic reticulum and Golgi apparatus, and is also unique in the sense that it exhibits few polymorphisms in the human population relative to the other HLA genes; however, there have been found different isoforms from numerous transcript variants found for the HLA-F gene. Its pathways include IFN-gamma signaling and CDK-mediated phosphorylation (cyclin-dependent kinase) and removal of the Saccharomyces cerevisiae Cdc6 protein, which is crucial for functional DNA replication.

== HLA-F ==
The Major Histocompatibility Complex (MHC) is a group of cell surface proteins that in humans is also called the Human Leukocyte Antigen (HLA) complex. These proteins are encoded by a cluster of genes known as the HLA locus. The HLA locus occupies a ~ 3Mbp stretch that is located on the short arm of chromosome 6, specifically on 6p21.1-21.3. The MHC proteins are classified into three main categories, namely class I, II, and III. There are over 140 genes within the HLA locus and they are often called HLA genes. HLA-A, B, and C are the classical class I genes and HLA-E, F and G are the nonclassical class I genes. The protein encoded from the gene HLA-F was originally isolated from the human lymphoblastoid cell line 721.

== Gene ==
The HLA-F gene is located on the short arm of chromosome 6, telomeric to the HLA-A locus. HLA-F has little allelic polymorphism and is highly conserved in other primates. HLA-F appears to be a recombinant between two multigene families, one that comprises conserved sequences found in all class I proteins (single transmembrane span) and another distinct family of genes with a conserved 3' UTR. Many of these genes are highly transcribed and differentially expressed. The heavy chain gene contains 8 exons. Exon one encodes the leader peptide, exons 2 and 3 encode the alpha1 and alpha2 domains, the putative peptide binding sites, exon 4 encodes the alpha3 domain, exon 5 and 6 encode the transmembrane region and exons 7 and 8 the cytoplasmic tail. However, exons 7 and 8 (the cytoplasmic tail) are not translated due to an in-frame translation termination codon in exon 6.

== Protein ==
The HLA-F protein is a ~40-41 kDa molecule with conserved domains. Exon 7 is absent from the mRNA of HLA-F. The absence of this exon produces a modification in the cytoplasmic tail of the protein making it shorter relative to classical HLA class-I proteins. The cytoplasmic tail helps HLA-F exit the endoplasmic reticulum, and that function is primarily done by the amino acid valine found at the C-terminal end of the tail.

== Structure ==
The structure of HLA-F is similar to that of the other HLA class I genes, which consist of eight exons. Of the key residues likely to form from the floor of the groove, position 97 is a glycine whose residue is a single proton, whereas in most class Ia structures it is a charged residue and in HLA-E, it is a bulky hydrophobic tryptophan. If the HLA-F groove binds to a peptide, then the glycine residue will create space in the mid-portion of the groove which might allow larger side chains to fit and be accommodated . This nonclassical class I gene also has two histidine residues (His 114-His116) close together in the C-terminal groove floor, mirroring His-9-His99 in HLA-E. Tyr 7, Tyr 59, Tyr 159 and Tyr 171, which are typically involved in the hydrogen-bonding network to the peptide N-terminal residues, are conserved.

The possible pocket regions of HLA-F include a situation where the A pocket is hydrophobic and similar to that of HLA-E, and pocket B retains Met 45 and Ala 67, which also characterize the HLA-E pocket and are likely to be hydrophobic and large. The C-pocket, however, differs significantly from that of the HLA-E with similarities to the C pocket of HLA-B8. In the D pocket region of this protein, the Asn 99 may favor a charged residue, but the other residues in this pocket, including phenylalanine make predictions hard to make. However, the F-pocket of HLA-F appears well conserved with HLA-E and the other class Ia molecules and likely favors an aliphatic group, such as leucine.

== Expression ==
Classic HLA class I molecules interact with HLA-F through their heavy chain. However, HLA class I molecules only interact with HLA-F when they are in the form of an open conformer (free of peptide). Thus, HLA-F is expressed independently of bound peptide.

=== Intracellular expression ===
HLA-F is expressed intracellularly in peripheral blood lymphocytes (PBL), resting lymphocyte cells (B, T, NK, and monocytes), tonsils, spleen, thymus, bladder, brain, colon, kidney, liver, lymphoblast, T cell leukemia, choriocarcinoma, and carcinoma.

=== Extracellular expression ===
HLA-F is expressed on the cell surface of activated lymphocytes, HeLa cells, EBV-transformed lymphoblastoid cells, and in some activated monocyte cell lines. The surface expression of HLA-F coincides with the activated immune response since HLA-F is mostly found on the surface of stimulated T memory cells but not on circulating regulatory T cells.

=== Expression during pregnancy ===
In the first trimester, HLA-F is weakly expressed in the trophoblastic elements residing outside the villi (extravillous trophoblast cells). Its expression increases and translocated onto the cell surface during the second trimester, coinciding with fetal growth which, in context, suggests it plays a role in development.

=== Interaction with NK cells ===
HLA-F can be expressed in two ways on the cell surface: with β2m and a peptide as a complex of HLA-F heavy chain or without the peptide and β2m as an open conformer with just the heavy chain. It can transport from the endoplasmic reticulum partially with the aid of tapasin, independent from the TAP protein complex, typically associated with antigen processing and transportation. Open conformer (OC) HLA-Fs can form homodimers and heterodimers with distinct HLA class I OCs, which may suggest they are involved in cross-presentation of extracellular antigens.

HLA OCs are able to bind to other receptors than the HLA complex with the β2m and peptide, most relevant to the diverse function of HLA-F. These receptors include binding inhibitory and activating immune receptors primarily expressed in natural killer (NK) cells, but also includes other immune cells. To do this, HLA OCs bind to the activating receptor KIR3DS1 and inhibitory receptor killer receptors 3DL1 and 3dL2.

Recent studies further suggest that HLA-F also presents long peptides (7 to more than 30 amino acids) to T cell receptors. They are able to do this because of an amino acid substitution in position 62 that forms an open-ended groove with N-terminal extensions. It is still not known if there may be consequences for this in the immune regulation at the feto-maternal contact zone.

== Transcriptional regulation of HLA-F ==
In the promoter of HLA-F, both studied regulatory modules display homology to the classical MHC class I genes. HLA-F has a conserved κB1 site enhancer bound by NF- κB, but the HLA-F gene is not induced by NF- κB without flanking regulatory sequences (such as IRSE) that provide a helper function. The IRSE in HLA-F is homologous to other classical MHC class I genes. INF- γ also induces HLA-F with its IRSE (IFN-stimulated response element). Further, it is also induced by CIITA, a transcriptional coactivator that regulates the transcription of MHC class II genes.

== Function ==
HLA-F belongs to the non-classical HLA class I heavy chain paralogues. Compared to classical HLA class I molecules, it exhibits very few polymorphisms. This class I molecule mainly exists as a heterodimer associated with the invariant light chain β-2 microglobulin.

HLA-F is currently the most enigmatic of the HLA molecules. Hence, its precise functions still remain to be resolved. Though, in contrast to other HLA molecules, it mainly resides intracellularly and rarely reaches the cell surface, e.g. upon activation of NK, B and T cells. Unlike classical HLA class I molecules, which possess ten highly conserved amino acids responsible for antigen recognition, HLA-F only has 5, suggesting a biological function different from peptide presentation. Upon immune cell activation, HLA-F binds free forms of HLA class I molecules and reaches the cell surface as heterodimer. In this way HLA-F stabilizes HLA class I molecules that haven't yet bound peptides, thereby acting as a chaperone and transporting the free HLA class I to, on, and from the cell surface.

=== Association with specialized ligands ===
HLA-F has been observed only in a subset of cell membranes, mostly B cells and activated lymphocytes. As a result, it has been suggested that its role involves association with specialized ligands that become available in the cell membrane of activated cells. For example, HLA-F can act as a peptide binding of ILT2 and ILT4. HLA-F can associate with TAP (transporter associated with antigen processing) and with the multimeric complex involved in peptide loading.

=== Maternal immunity tolerance ===
It has been observed that all three non-classical HLA class I proteins are expressed in placental trophoblasts in contact with maternal immune cells. This suggests that these proteins collaborate in the immune response and that HLA-F plays a fundamental role in both normal and maternal immune response. HLA-F is also expressed in decidual extravillous trophoblasts. During pregnancy, HLA-F interacts with T reg cells and extravillous trophoblasts mediating maternal tolerance to the fetus.

=== Intermolecular communication ===
During the interaction between HLA-F and the heavy chain (HC) of HLA class I molecules in activated lymphocytes, HLA-F plays a role as a chaperone, escorting HLA class I HC to the cell surface and stabilizing its expression in the absence of peptide. HLA-F binds most allelic forms of HLA class I open conformers, but it does not bind peptide complexes.

The expression patterns of HLA-F in T cells suggest that HLA-F is involved in the communication pathway between T reg and activated T cells, where HLA-F signals that the immune response has been activated. During this communication, either HLA-F invokes secretion of inhibitory cytokines by the regulatory T cells or it provides a simple inhibitory signal to the regulatory T cells, allowing a normal immune response to proceed.

=== Exogenous antigen cross-presentation ===
Viral proteins and other exogenous antigens decrease surface HLA-F expression because the exogenous proteins interact with HLA class I molecules at the same sites where HLA-F interacts, producing crosslinking. The exogenous proteins trigger an internal co-localization of both HLA-F and HLA class I molecules. Exogenous proteins with higher affinity will interact more readily with HLA class I molecules triggering a dissociation of HLA class I/HLA-F, thereby reducing the surface levels of HLA-F. HLA-F interacts with the open conformer (OC) of HLA class I and they function together in cross-presentation of exogenous antigen. Exogenous antigen binds to a structure on the surface of activated cells; this structure is composed of HLA class I open conformer and HLA-F; the peptide-binding point of contact is a specific HLA class I epitope on the exogenous antigen.

=== Ligand during inflammatory response ===
The complex HLA-F/HLA class I OC has two distinct roles that are central to the inflammatory response: first, it is a ligand for KIR receptors and can both activate and inhibit KIR; second, it is involved in cross-presentation of exogenous antigen.

The complex HLA-F/HLA class-I OC is a ligand for a subset of KIR (Killer-cell immunoglobulin-like receptor) receptors. Specifically, it was demonstrated that HLA-F interacts physically and functionally with three KIR receptors: KIR3DL2, KIR2DS4, and KIR3DS1, particularly during the inflammatory response. KIR directly interacts with both HLA-F and HLA class-I individually (i.e. no dimerization between HLA-F and HLA class-I is necessary).

== Disease association ==
HLA-F has been linked to several diseases (Table). For cancer and tumors, HLA-F expression has been found to be enhanced in gastric adenocarcinoma, breast cancer, esophageal carcinoma, lung cancer, hepatocellular carcinoma, and neuroblastoma. HLA-F has also been associated with susceptibility to several diseases: hepatitis B, Systemic Lupus Erythematosus, and Type 1 diabetes (T1D).

Disease associations
disease	reference
gastric adenocarcinoma	
breast cancer	
esophageal carcinoma	
lung cancer	
hepatocellular carcinoma	
neuroblastoma	
hepatitis B	
Systemic Lupus Erythematosus	
Type 1 Diabetes	
