= UGGT =

Class of enzymes

UDP-Glucose Glycoprotein Glucosyltransferase
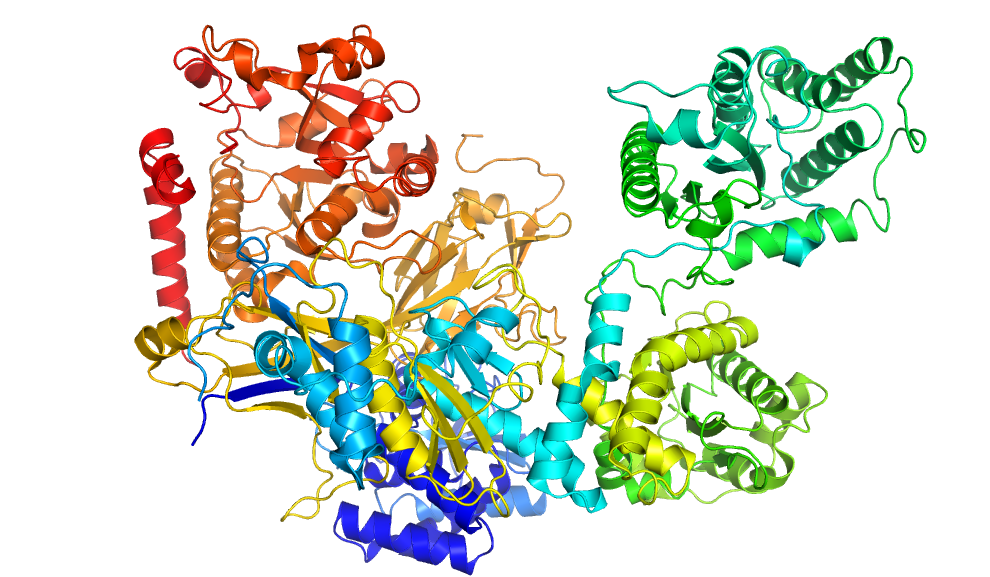
- Chaetomium thermophilum UGGT PDB: PDB: PDB: PDB

Identifiers
- Symbol: UGGT
- UniProt: G0SB58

Other data
- Locus: Chr. 2 {{{Arm}}}{{{Band}}}{{{LocusSupplementaryData}}}
Search for
- Structures: Swiss-model
- Domains: InterPro

UGGT, or UDP-glucose:glycoprotein glucosyltransferase, is a soluble enzyme resident in the lumen of the endoplasmic reticulum (ER).

The main function of UGGT is to recognize misfolded glycoproteins and transfer a glucose (Glc) monomer (monoglucosylate) to the terminal mannose of the A-branch of the glycan on the glycoprotein. It uses UDP-glucose (UDP-Glc) as the glucosyl donor and requires calcium ions for its activity:

misfolded-glycoprotein-Asn-GlcNAc2Man9 + UDP-Glc => misfolded-glycoprotein-Asn-GlcNAc2Man9Glc1 + UDP

UGGT is about 170 kDa and it consists of two structurally independent portions: a variable N-terminal portion of ~1200 amino acids, which in turn comprises 4 thioredoxin-like domains and two beta-sandwich domains, and senses glycoprotein misfolding; and a highly conserved C-terminal catalytic portion of ~300 amino acids, folding as a glucosyltransferase domain belonging to fold family GT24. Higher eukaryotes possess two isoforms, UGGT1 and UGGT2, but only in 2020 the latter was conclusively shown to be active in misfolded glycoprotein recognition

UGGT is part of the ER quality control system of glycoprotein folding and its activity increases the potential for correctly folded glycoproteins. The main proteins involved in the ER quality control system are UGGT, the ER lectin chaperones (calnexin and calreticulin), and glucosidase II. UGGT first recognizes the incompletely folded glycoprotein and monoglucosylates it. The lectins, calnexin and calreticulin, have high affinities for monoglucosylated proteins and the ER chaperones that associate with these lectins assist the folding of the misfolded glycoprotein. Subsequently, glucosidase II will deglucosylate the glycoprotein. If the glycoprotein is still misfolded, UGGT will re-glucosylate it and allow it to go through the cycle again.

Currently, it is unclear how UGGT recognizes misfolded glycoprotein. It has been proposed that UGGT may bind to exposed hydrophobic stretches, a characteristic feature of misfolded proteins. UGGT crystal structures and Molecular Dynamics simulations suggest marked conformational mobility, which could explain the ability of the protein to recognise a wide variety of client glycoproteins of different shapes and forms. The same conformational mobility could account for the ability of the protein to re-glucosylate N-linked glycans at different distances from the misfold site. See for example the picture in which glycoproteins are symbolized by nuts and UGGT by an adjustable wrench.

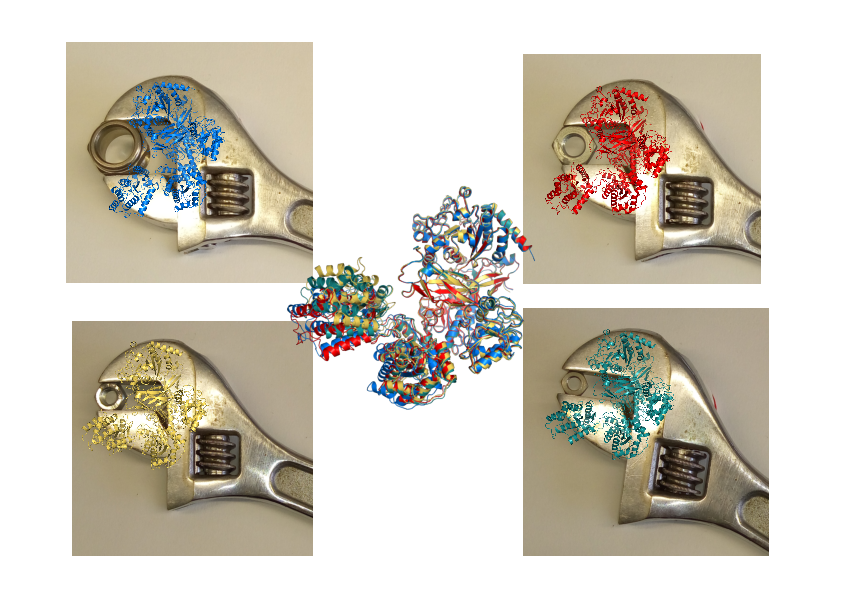
UGGT-is-like-a-wrench-glycoproteins-like-nuts
