= IFI30 =

Protein-coding gene in the species Homo sapiens

Identifiers
- Aliases: IFI30, GILT, IFI-30, IP30, IP-30, lysosomal thiol reductase, IFI30 lysosomal thiol reductase
- External IDs: OMIM: 604664; MGI: 2137648; HomoloGene: 38171; GeneCards: IFI30; OMA:IFI30 - orthologs

Gene location (Human)
Chr.	Chromosome 19 (human)
Band	19p13.11	Start	18,173,162 bp
Band	19p13.11	End	18,178,117 bp

Gene location (Mouse)
Chr.	Chromosome 8 (mouse)
Band	8|8 B3.3	Start	71,215,419 bp
Band	8|8 B3.3	End	71,219,307 bp
RNA expression pattern
Bgee	Human / Mouse (ortholog); Top expressed in: monocyte; granulocyte; blood; appendix; spleen; upper lobe of left lung; right lung; lymph node; duodenum; right adrenal cortex / Top expressed in: spleen; duodenum; colon; yolk sac; jejunum; stomach; ileum; thymus; zone of skin; lip; More reference expression data
BioGPS	n/a
Gene ontology
Molecular function	oxidoreductase activity; protein binding; oxidoreductase activity, acting on a sulfur group of donors
Cellular component	extracellular region; cell junction; lysosomal lumen; intracellular membrane-bounded organelle; lysosome; cytosol
Biological process	interferon-gamma-mediated signaling pathway; immune system process; antigen processing and presentation of exogenous peptide antigen via MHC class II; antigen processing and presentation of exogenous peptide antigen via MHC class I
Sources:Amigo / QuickGO
Orthologs
Species	Human	Mouse
Entrez	10437	65972
Ensembl	ENSG00000216490	ENSMUSG00000031838
UniProt	P13284	Q9ESY9
RefSeq (mRNA)	NM_006332	NM_023065
RefSeq (protein)	NP_006323	NP_075552
Location (UCSC)	Chr 19: 18.17 – 18.18 Mb	Chr 8: 71.22 – 71.22 Mb
PubMed search
- Wikidata
View/Edit Human	View/Edit Mouse

Gamma-interferon-inducible lysosomal thiol reductase is an enzyme that, in humans, is encoded by the IFI30 gene.

The protein encoded by this gene is a lysosomal thiol reductase that at low pH can reduce protein disulfide bonds. The enzyme is expressed constitutively in antigen-presenting cells and induced by gamma-interferon in other cell types. This enzyme has an important role in MHC class II-restricted antigen processing.
