= TAP2 =

Protein-coding gene in the species Homo sapiens

Identifiers
- Aliases: TAP2, ABC18, ABCB3, APT2, D6S217E, PSF-2, PSF2, RING11, transporter 2, ATP-binding cassette, sub-family B (MDR/TAP), transporter 2, ATP binding cassette subfamily B member
- External IDs: OMIM: 170261; MGI: 98484; GeneCards: TAP2
Enzyme activity
EC #	BRENDA	ExPASy	KEGG	MetaCyc
7.4.2.14	↗	↗	↗	↗

Gene location (Human)
Chr.	Chromosome 6 (human)
Band	6p21.32	Start	32,821,833 bp
Band	6p21.32	End	32,838,739 bp

Gene location (Mouse)
Chr.	Chromosome 17 (mouse)
Band	17 B1|17 17.98 cM	Start	34,422,501 bp
Band	17 B1|17 17.98 cM	End	34,435,295 bp
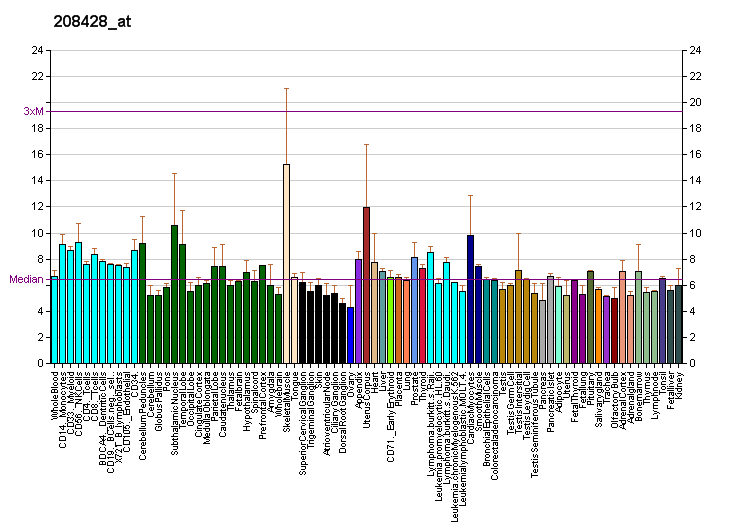

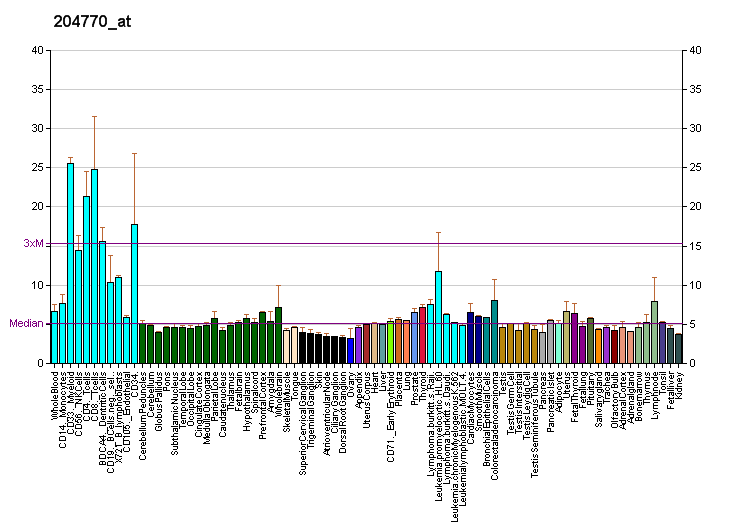

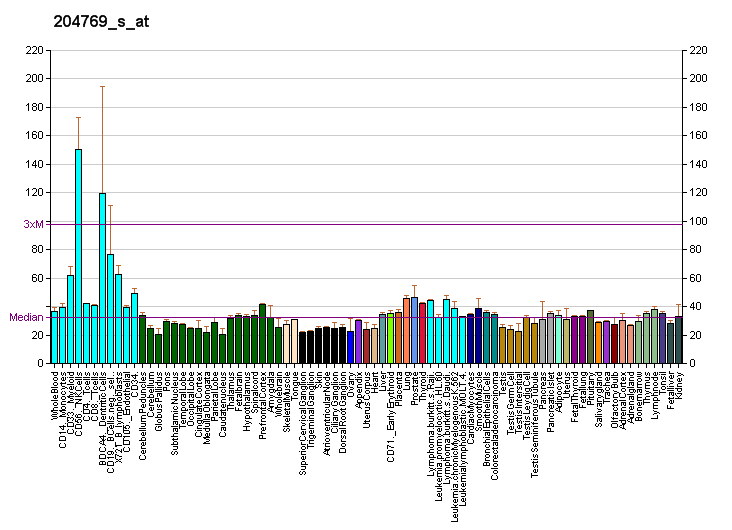
RNA expression pattern
Bgee	Human / Mouse (ortholog); Top expressed in: appendix; lymph node; monocyte; granulocyte; duodenum; apex of heart; spleen; stromal cell of endometrium; mucosa of transverse colon; blood / Top expressed in: thymus; granulocyte; mesenteric lymph nodes; lactiferous gland; spleen; duodenum; subcutaneous adipose tissue; jejunum; bone marrow; submandibular gland; More reference expression data
BioGPS	More reference expression data
Gene ontology
Molecular function	MHC protein binding; ATPase-coupled transmembrane transporter activity; nucleotide binding; ABC-type peptide transporter activity; transporter activity; tapasin binding; MHC class Ib protein binding; ABC-type peptide antigen transporter activity; ATPase activity; protein binding; TAP1 binding; ATP binding; peptide transmembrane transporter activity; MHC class I protein binding; TAP2 binding
Cellular component	TAP complex; endoplasmic reticulum membrane; membrane; integral component of endoplasmic reticulum membrane; integral component of membrane; endoplasmic reticulum; nuclear speck; phagocytic vesicle membrane; endoplasmic reticulum-Golgi intermediate compartment membrane; MHC class I peptide loading complex
Biological process	adaptive immune response; immune system process; antigen processing and presentation of peptide antigen via MHC class I; antigen processing and presentation of endogenous peptide antigen via MHC class Ib via ER pathway, TAP-dependent; transmembrane transport; protein transport; peptide transport; viral process; cytosol to endoplasmic reticulum transport; antigen processing and presentation of endogenous peptide antigen via MHC class I; peptide antigen transport; antigen processing and presentation of exogenous peptide antigen via MHC class I, TAP-dependent; vesicle fusion with endoplasmic reticulum-Golgi intermediate compartment (ERGIC) membrane; transport
Sources:Amigo / QuickGO
Orthologs
Databases	NCBI: entry; OMA: entry
Species	Human	Mouse
Entrez	6891	21355
Ensembl	ENSG00000204267; ENSG00000206299; ENSG00000228582; ENSG00000206235; ENSG00000225967 ENSG00000237599; ENSG00000223481; ENSG00000232326	ENSMUSG00000024339
UniProt	Q03519	P36371
RefSeq (mRNA)	NM_018833; NM_000544; NM_001290043	NM_011530
RefSeq (protein)	NP_000535; NP_001276972; NP_061313	NP_035660
Location (UCSC)	Chr 6: 32.82 – 32.84 Mb	Chr 17: 34.42 – 34.44 Mb
PubMed search
- Wikidata
View/Edit Human	View/Edit Mouse

TAP2 is a gene in humans that encodes the protein Antigen peptide transporter 2.

== Function ==
The membrane-associated protein encoded by this gene is a member of the superfamily of ATP-binding cassette (ABC) transporters. ABC proteins transport various molecules across extra- and intra-cellular membranes. ABC genes are divided into seven distinct subfamilies (ABC1, MDR/TAP, MRP, ALD, OABP, GCN20, White). This protein is a member of the MDR/TAP subfamily. Members of the MDR/TAP subfamily are involved in multidrug resistance. This gene is located 7 kb telomeric to gene family member ABCB2 (TAP1). The protein encoded by this gene is involved in antigen presentation. This protein forms a heterodimer with ABCB2 in order to transport peptides from the cytoplasm to the endoplasmic reticulum. Mutations in this gene may be associated with ankylosing spondylitis, insulin-dependent diabetes mellitus, schizophrenia, and celiac disease. Alternative splicing of this gene produces two products which differ in peptide selectivity and level of restoration of surface expression of MHC class I molecules.

== See also ==
- ATP-binding cassette transporter
