= Thiol oxidoreductase =

Thiol oxidoreductases are proteins that redox control by utilizing catalytic cysteine (Cys) residues for oxidation or reduction of their substrates. Examples of such proteins include thioredoxin, thioredoxin reductase, glutathione reductase, glutaredoxin, glutathione peroxidase, and peroxiredoxin.

They are involved in various processes, such as sulfur metabolism, DNA synthesis and repair, signaling, protein degradation, oxidative folding, protein modification, regulation of gene expression.

Some form functional complexes/modules, where one thiol oxidoreductase acts on another. For example, thioredoxin reductase provides reducing equivalents to thioredoxin, which in turn reduces peroxiredoxin.
