= Exogenous bacteria =

Microorganisms introduced to closed biological systems from the external world

Exogenous bacteria are microorganisms introduced to closed biological systems from the external world. They exist in aquatic and terrestrial environments, as well as the atmosphere. Microorganisms in the external environment have existed on Earth for 3.5 billion years. Exogenous bacteria can be either benign or pathogenic. Pathogenic exogenous bacteria can enter a closed biological system and cause disease such as Cholera, which is induced by a waterborne microbe that infects the human intestine. Exogenous bacteria can be introduced into a closed ecosystem as well, and have mutualistic benefits for both the microbe and the host. A prominent example of this concept is bacterial flora, which consists of exogenous bacteria ingested and endogenously colonized during the early stages of life. Bacteria that are part of normal internal ecosystems, also known as bacterial flora, are called Endogenous Bacteria. A significant amount of prominent diseases are induced by exogenous bacteria such as gonorrhea, meningitis, tetanus, and syphilis. Pathogenic exogenous bacteria can enter a host via cutaneous transmission, inhalation, and consumption.

== Difference with endogenous bacteria ==
Only a minority of bacteria species cause disease in humans; and many species colonize in the human body to create an ecosystem known as microbiota. Bacterial flora is endogenous bacteria, which is defined as bacteria that naturally reside in a closed system. Disease can occur when microbes included in normal bacteria flora enter a sterile area of the body such as the brain or muscle. This is considered an endogenous infection. A prime example of this is when the residential bacterium E. coli of the GI tract enters the urinary tract. This causes a urinary tract infection. Infections caused by exogenous bacteria occurs when microbes that are noncommensal enter a host. These microbes can enter a host via inhalation of aerosolized bacteria, ingestion of contaminated or ill-prepared foods, sexual activity, or the direct contact of a wound with the bacteria.

== Diseases ==
=== Waterborne and foodborne ===
Microbial ecosystems in aquatic environments depend on a variety of factors including pH, temperature, and light exposure. Exogenous bacteria supported in specific aquatic environments can enter a host via consumption. Additionally, exogenous bacteria can enter a secondary host through an intermediate host such as insects and parasites. Exogenous bacteria can also enter an enclosed ecosystem via ingestion of contaminated food. Food-borne diseases such as Salmonella poisoning are transmitted by food not properly cooked or by individuals infected with the pathogen.

==== Salmonella enterocolitis ====
One of the most common food-borne illnesses, Salmonella poisoning is caused by ingestion of unsanitary conditions during food preparation. Salmonella can also be transmitted to humans via reptiles like turtles and iguanas, which are known carriers of pathogen. Symptoms include chills, diarrhea and fever.

==== Cholera ====
Cholera is a waterborne infection caused by the bacterium Vibrio cholerae, and is transmitted via food or water that is contaminated with fecal matter. Vibrio cholerae releases a toxin that induces an increased amount of water in the small intestines. Symptoms primarily observed include, watery diarrhea and vomiting that can cause dehydration and death if not treated. An estimated 3-5 million cases of Cholera occur yearly around the world. The exogenous bacteria derived infection is primarilyfound in Africa, Asia, as well as Central and South America.

==== Campylobacter ====
Campylobacter infections are transmitted to a host via contaminated water and food, sexual activity, and interaction with infected animals. Symptoms include diarrhea, cramping, and abdominal pain. Campylobacter can cause disease in both humans and animals, and most human cases are induced by the species Campylobacter jejuni.

=== Terrestrial exogenous bacteria ===
Of all the residential microbes found in soil, bacteria is the smallest and most abundant. According to studies, there is an estimated 60,000 different types of bacteria that reside in the soil. Terrestrial bacteria can characteristically be either aerobic or anaerobic, and some can be pathogenic if consumed by a host.

==== Anthrax ====
Anthrax is a disease caused via a bacterium that resides in soil, and predominately affects animals more than humans. Anthrax is also considered a zoonotic disease and is transmitted to humans via contact with an infected animal host. The disease is caused by gram-positive Bacillus anthracis (B. anthracis) and is found globally. B. anthracis can enter a host via cutaneous transmission, inhalation, and/or consumption.

==== Botulism ====
Botulism is a rare disease caused by the bacterium Clostridium botulinum. This microbe is primarily found in the soil or untreated water. Botulism spores can survive in unproperly canned or ill-prepared foods. Even ingesting trace amounts of the spores can lead to severe poisoning that causes symptoms such as vomiting, nausea, and even paralysis.

== See also ==
- Bacterial flora
- Cholera
- Waterborne diseases

== Sources ==
- Willey, Joanne; Sherwood, Linda; Woolverton, Christopher (2011). Prescott's Microbiology (8th ed.). New York: McGraw Hill. ISBN 978-0-07-337526-7.
