= ERp27 =

ERP27

Identifiers
- Aliases: ERP27, C12orf46, PDIA8, endoplasmic reticulum protein 27
- External IDs: OMIM: 610642; MGI: 1916437; GeneCards: ERP27
Available structures
PDB	Ortholog search: PDBe RCSB
PDB	List of PDB id codes 2L4C, 4F9Z

Gene location (Human)
Chr.	Chromosome 12 (human)
Band	12p12.3	Start	14,914,039 bp
Band	12p12.3	End	14,938,537 bp

Gene location (Mouse)
Chr.	Chromosome 6 (mouse)
Band	6|6 G1	Start	136,884,309 bp
Band	6|6 G1	End	136,899,178 bp
RNA expression pattern
Bgee	Human / Mouse (ortholog); Top expressed in: body of pancreas; pancreatic epithelial cell; right uterine tube; tibialis anterior muscle; islet of Langerhans; human kidney; gonad; mucosa of ileum; urinary bladder; granulocyte / Top expressed in: pancreas; granulocyte; islet of Langerhans; embryo; stomach; duodenum; thymus; mesenteric lymph nodes; migratory enteric neural crest cell; gastrula; More reference expression data
BioGPS	n/a
Gene ontology
Molecular function	protein binding; protein disulfide isomerase activity; peptidyl-proline 4-dioxygenase activity
Cellular component	endoplasmic reticulum lumen; endoplasmic reticulum
Biological process	protein folding; response to endoplasmic reticulum stress; peptidyl-proline hydroxylation; regulation of oxidative stress-induced intrinsic apoptotic signaling pathway
Sources:Amigo / QuickGO
Orthologs
Databases	NCBI: entry; OMA: entry
Species	Human	Mouse
Entrez	121506	69187
Ensembl	ENSG00000139055	ENSMUSG00000030219
UniProt	Q96DN0	Q9D8U3
RefSeq (mRNA)	NM_152321; NM_001300784	NM_026983
RefSeq (protein)	NP_001287713; NP_689534	NP_081259
Location (UCSC)	Chr 12: 14.91 – 14.94 Mb	Chr 6: 136.88 – 136.9 Mb
PubMed search
- Wikidata
View/Edit Human	View/Edit Mouse

Endoplasmic reticulum resident protein 27 is a protein that in humans is encoded by the ERP27 gene. It is a homologue of PDI (protein disulfide-isomerase), localised to the Endoplasmic Reticulum. The structure of ERp27 has been solved by both X-ray crystallography and NMR spectroscopy, showing it to be composed of two thioredoxin-like domains with homology to the non-catalytic b and b' domains of PDI. The function of ERp27 is unknown, but on the basis of its homology with PDI it is thought to possess chaperone activity.
