= Calreticulin =

Soluble protein

CALR
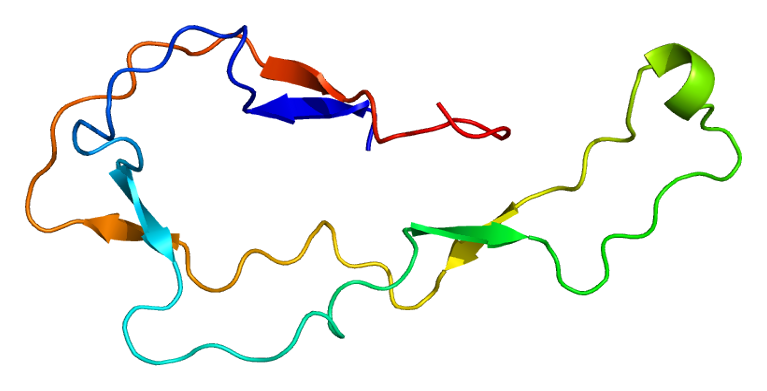

Identifiers
- Aliases: CALR, CRT, HEL-S-99n, RO, SSA, cC1qR, calreticulin
- External IDs: OMIM: 109091; MGI: 88252; GeneCards: CALR
Available structures
PDB	Ortholog search: PDBe RCSB
PDB	List of PDB id codes 3POW, 2CLR, 3DOW, 3POS

Gene location (Human)
Chr.	Chromosome 19 (human)
Band	19p13.13	Start	12,938,578 bp
Band	19p13.13	End	12,944,489 bp

Gene location (Mouse)
Chr.	Chromosome 8 (mouse)
Band	8 C3|8 41.21 cM	Start	85,568,479 bp
Band	8 C3|8 41.21 cM	End	85,573,563 bp
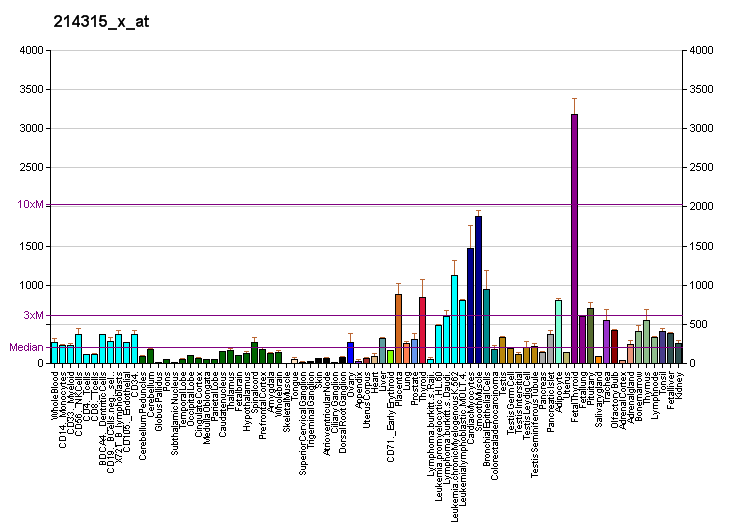

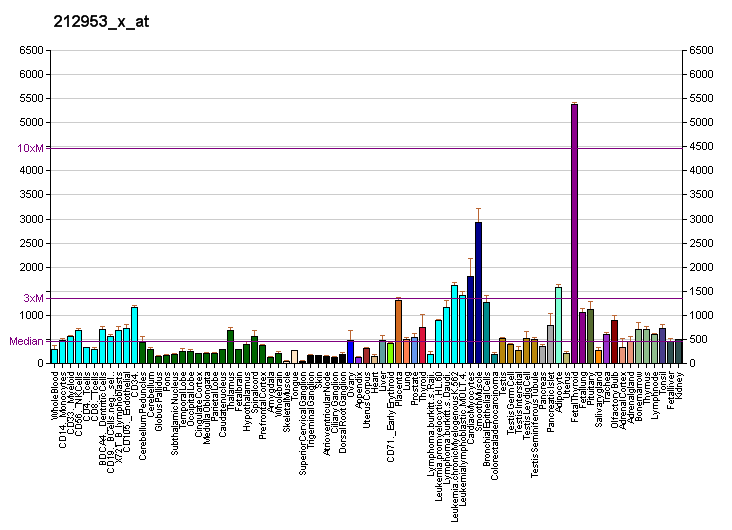

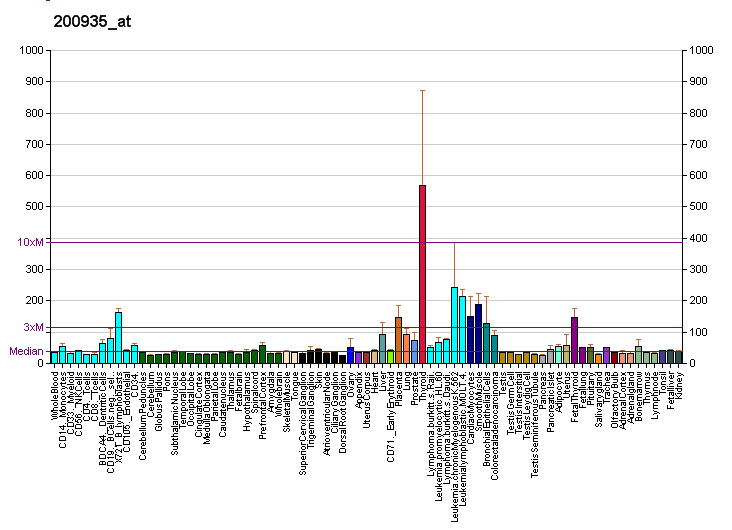
RNA expression pattern
Bgee	Human / Mouse (ortholog); Top expressed in: stromal cell of endometrium; left lobe of thyroid gland; right lobe of thyroid gland; islet of Langerhans; smooth muscle tissue; anterior pituitary; epithelium of colon; rectum; upper lobe of left lung; mucosa of transverse colon / Top expressed in: gastrula; tail of embryo; molar; pyloric antrum; spermatocyte; external carotid artery; internal carotid artery; genital tubercle; epithelium of stomach; calvaria; More reference expression data
BioGPS	More reference expression data
Gene ontology
Molecular function	calcium ion binding; protein folding chaperone activity; carbohydrate binding; hormone binding; metal ion binding; complement component C1q complex binding; mRNA binding; iron ion binding; unfolded protein binding; zinc ion binding; integrin binding; DNA binding; chaperone binding; peptide binding; androgen receptor binding; ubiquitin protein ligase binding; RNA binding; protein binding
Cellular component	cytoplasm; cytosol; endoplasmic reticulum lumen; membrane; focal adhesion; extracellular region; perinuclear region of cytoplasm; sarcoplasmic reticulum lumen; nucleus; endocytic vesicle lumen; cell surface; endoplasmic reticulum; extracellular exosome; Golgi apparatus; intracellular membrane-bounded organelle; extracellular matrix; intracellular anatomical structure; integral component of lumenal side of endoplasmic reticulum membrane; sarcoplasmic reticulum; smooth endoplasmic reticulum; MHC class I peptide loading complex; acrosomal vesicle; external side of plasma membrane; polysome; phagocytic vesicle membrane; endoplasmic reticulum-Golgi intermediate compartment membrane; extracellular space; nuclear envelope; protein-containing complex; endoplasmic reticulum quality control compartment; collagen-containing extracellular matrix
Biological process	negative regulation of neuron differentiation; protein folding in endoplasmic reticulum; receptor-mediated endocytosis; response to organic substance; cellular senescence; spermatogenesis; positive regulation of dendritic cell chemotaxis; regulation of apoptotic process; cellular response to organic substance; positive regulation of phagocytosis; negative regulation of intracellular steroid hormone receptor signaling pathway; regulation of transcription, DNA-templated; negative regulation of retinoic acid receptor signaling pathway; cardiac muscle cell differentiation; regulation of meiotic nuclear division; protein maturation by protein folding; positive regulation of cell cycle; protein export from nucleus; cellular response to lithium ion; peptide antigen assembly with MHC class I protein complex; antigen processing and presentation of peptide antigen via MHC class I; protein stabilization; cellular calcium ion homeostasis; negative regulation of transcription by RNA polymerase II; positive regulation of DNA replication; protein folding; negative regulation of transcription, DNA-templated; cortical actin cytoskeleton organization; chaperone-mediated protein folding; response to estradiol; response to testosterone; ATF6-mediated unfolded protein response; positive regulation of substrate adhesion-dependent cell spreading; sequestering of calcium ion; positive regulation of gene expression; positive regulation of cell population proliferation; protein localization to nucleus; glucocorticoid receptor signaling pathway; positive regulation of NIK/NF-kappaB signaling; antigen processing and presentation of exogenous peptide antigen via MHC class I, TAP-dependent; negative regulation of translation; vesicle fusion with endoplasmic reticulum-Golgi intermediate compartment (ERGIC) membrane; positive regulation of endothelial cell migration; negative regulation of trophoblast cell migration
Sources:Amigo / QuickGO
Orthologs
Databases	NCBI: entry; OMA: entry
Species	Human	Mouse
Entrez	811	12317
Ensembl	ENSG00000179218	ENSMUSG00000003814
UniProt	P27797	P14211
RefSeq (mRNA)	NM_004343	NM_007591
RefSeq (protein)	NP_004334	NP_031617
Location (UCSC)	Chr 19: 12.94 – 12.94 Mb	Chr 8: 85.57 – 85.57 Mb
PubMed search
- Wikidata
View/Edit Human	View/Edit Mouse

Calreticulin (CRT), also known as CALR, calregulin, CRP55, CaBP3, calsequestrin-like protein, and endoplasmic reticulum resident protein 60 (ERp60), is a protein that in humans is encoded by the CALR gene.

Calreticulin is a multifunctional soluble protein that binds Ca^{2+} ions (a second messenger in signal transduction), rendering them inactive. The Ca^{2+} is bound with low affinity, but high capacity, and can be released on a signal (see inositol trisphosphate). Calreticulin is located in storage compartments associated with the endoplasmic reticulum and is considered an ER resident protein.

The term mobilferrin is considered to be the same as calreticulin by some sources.

== Function ==
Calreticulin binds to misfolded proteins and prevents them from being exported from the endoplasmic reticulum to the Golgi apparatus.

A similar quality-control molecular chaperone, calnexin, performs the same service for soluble proteins as does calreticulin, however it is a membrane-bound protein. Both proteins, calnexin and calreticulin, have the function of binding to oligosaccharides containing terminal glucose residues, thereby targeting them for degradation. Calreticulin and Calnexin's ability to bind carbohydrates associates them with the lectin protein family. In normal cellular function, trimming of glucose residues off the core oligosaccharide added during N-linked glycosylation is a part of protein processing. If "overseer" enzymes note that residues are misfolded, proteins within the rER will re-add glucose residues so that other calreticulin/calnexin can bind to these proteins and prevent them from proceeding to the Golgi. This leads these aberrantly folded proteins down a path whereby they are targeted for degradation.

Studies on transgenic mice reveal that calreticulin is a cardiac embryonic gene that is essential during development.

Calreticulin and calnexin are also integral in the production of MHC class I proteins. As newly synthesized MHC class I α-chains enter the endoplasmic reticulum, calnexin binds on to them retaining them in a partly folded state. After the β2-microglobulin binds to the peptide-loading complex (PLC), calreticulin (along with ERp57) takes over the job of chaperoning the MHC class I protein while the tapasin links the complex to the transporter associated with antigen processing (TAP) complex. This association prepares the MHC class I to bind an antigen for presentation on the cell surface.

=== Transcription regulation ===
Calreticulin is also found in the nucleus, suggesting that it may have a role in transcription regulation. Calreticulin binds to the synthetic peptide KLGFFKR, which is almost identical to an amino acid sequence in the DNA-binding domain of the superfamily of nuclear receptors. The amino terminus of calreticulin interacts with the DNA-binding domain of the glucocorticoid receptor and prevents the receptor from binding to its specific glucocorticoid response element. Calreticulin can inhibit the binding of androgen receptor to its hormone-responsive DNA element and can inhibit androgen receptor and retinoic acid receptor transcriptional activities in vivo, as well as retinoic acid-induced neuronal differentiation. Thus, calreticulin can act as an important modulator of the regulation of gene transcription by nuclear hormone receptors.

== Clinical significance ==
Calreticulin binds to antibodies in certain areas of systemic lupus and Sjögren patients that contain anti-Ro/SSA antibodies. Systemic lupus erythematosus is associated with increased autoantibody titers against calreticulin, but calreticulin is not a Ro/SS-A antigen. Earlier papers referred to calreticulin as an Ro/SS-A antigen, but this was later disproven. Increased autoantibody titer against human calreticulin is found in infants with complete congenital heart block of both the IgG and IgM classes.

In 2013, two groups detected calreticulin mutations in a majority of JAK2-negative / MPL-negative patients with essential thrombocythemia and primary myelofibrosis, which makes CALR mutations the second most common in myeloproliferative neoplasms. All mutations (insertions or deletions) affected the last exon, generating a reading frame shift of the resulting protein, that creates a novel terminal peptide and causes a loss of endoplasmic reticulum KDEL retention signal. The most common deletion in CALR (p.L367Tfs*46) is the result of DNA double-strand break, followed by a repair through the pathway microhomology-mediated end joining (MMEJ).

== Role in cancer ==
Calreticulin is expressed in many cancer cells and plays a role to promote macrophages to engulf hazardous cancerous cells. The reason why most of the cells are not destroyed is the presence of another molecule with the signal CD47, which blocks CRT. Hence, antibodies that block CD47 might be useful as a cancer treatment. In mice models of myeloid leukemia and non-Hodgkin lymphoma, anti-CD47 was effective in clearing cancer cells while normal cells were unaffected.

== Interactions ==
Calreticulin has been shown to interact with Perforin and NK2 homeobox 1.
