= TAP1 =

Protein-coding gene in the species Homo sapiens

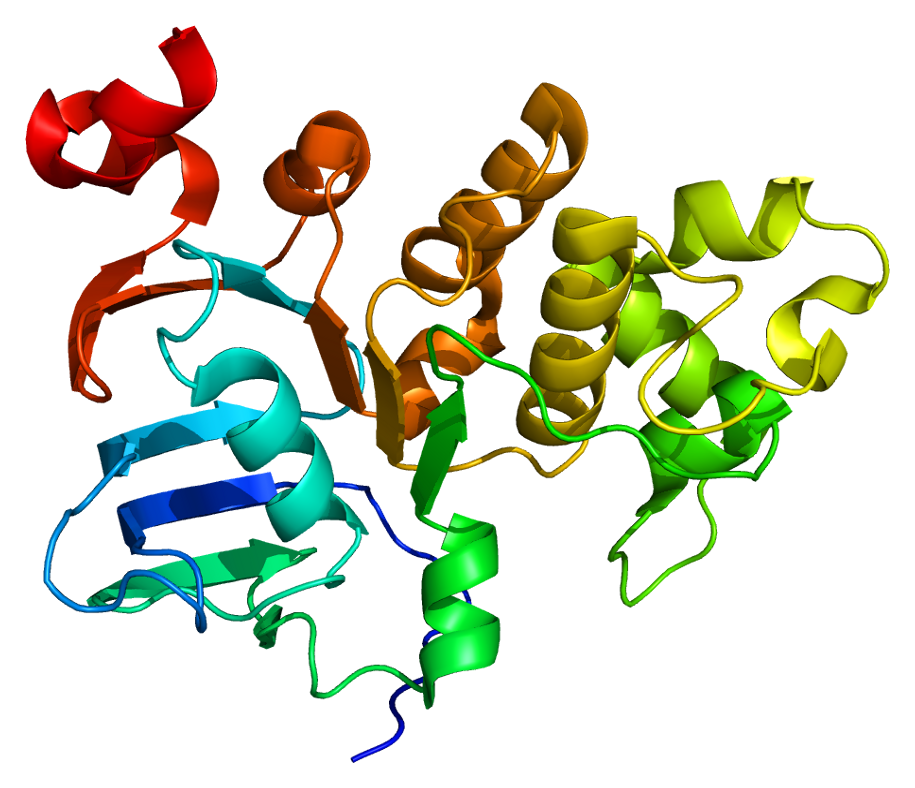

Identifiers
- Aliases: TAP1, ABC17, ABCB2, APT1, D6S114E, PSF-1, PSF1, RING4, TAP1*0102N, TAP1N, transporter 1, ATP-binding cassette, sub-family B (MDR/TAP), transporter 1, ATP binding cassette subfamily B member
- External IDs: OMIM: 170260; MGI: 98483; GeneCards: TAP1
Available structures
PDB	Ortholog search: PDBe RCSB
PDB	List of PDB id codes 1JJ7
Enzyme activity
EC #	BRENDA	ExPASy	KEGG	MetaCyc
7.4.2.14	↗	↗	↗	↗

Gene location (Human)
Chr.	Chromosome 6 (human)
Band	6p21.32	Start	32,845,209 bp
Band	6p21.32	End	32,853,816 bp

Gene location (Mouse)
Chr.	Chromosome 17 (mouse)
Band	17 B1|17 17.98 cM	Start	34,406,527 bp
Band	17 B1|17 17.98 cM	End	34,416,199 bp
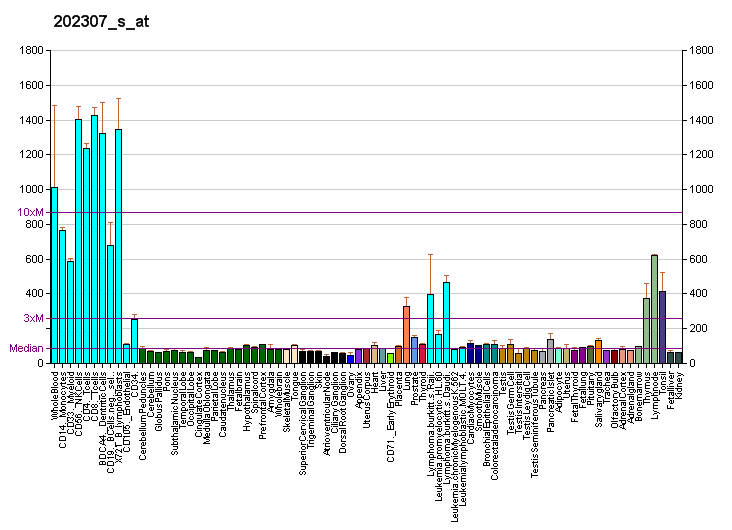
RNA expression pattern
Bgee	Human / Mouse (ortholog); Top expressed in: granulocyte; appendix; lymph node; blood; spleen; monocyte; duodenum; skin of abdomen; skin of leg; upper lobe of left lung / Top expressed in: mesenteric lymph nodes; granulocyte; thymus; spleen; mucous cell of stomach; intestinal villus; jejunum; Ileal epithelium; duodenum; subcutaneous adipose tissue; More reference expression data
BioGPS	More reference expression data
Gene ontology
Molecular function	MHC protein binding; nucleotide binding; protein homodimerization activity; ABC-type peptide transporter activity; TAP2 binding; MHC class Ib protein binding; ATPase activity; protein binding; MHC class I protein binding; TAP1 binding; ATP binding; peptide antigen binding; ADP binding; ATPase-coupled transmembrane transporter activity; ABC-type peptide antigen transporter activity; peptide transmembrane transporter activity
Cellular component	integral component of membrane; endoplasmic reticulum membrane; membrane; TAP complex; integral component of endoplasmic reticulum membrane; mitochondrion; endoplasmic reticulum; microtubule organizing center; phagocytic vesicle membrane; endoplasmic reticulum-Golgi intermediate compartment membrane; MHC class I peptide loading complex
Biological process	defense response; adaptive immune response; immune system process; antigen processing and presentation of peptide antigen via MHC class I; antigen processing and presentation of endogenous peptide antigen via MHC class I; protein transport; peptide transport; viral process; cytosol to endoplasmic reticulum transport; antigen processing and presentation of exogenous peptide antigen via MHC class I, TAP-dependent; vesicle fusion with endoplasmic reticulum-Golgi intermediate compartment (ERGIC) membrane; transmembrane transport; transport
Sources:Amigo / QuickGO
Orthologs
Databases	NCBI: entry; OMA: entry
Species	Human	Mouse
Entrez	6890	21354
Ensembl	ENSG00000226173; ENSG00000168394; ENSG00000224212; ENSG00000230705; ENSG00000206297 ENSG00000227816; ENSG00000224748; ENSG00000232367	ENSMUSG00000037321
UniProt	Q03518	P21958
RefSeq (mRNA)	NM_001292022; NM_000593	NM_001161730; NM_013683
RefSeq (protein)	NP_000584; NP_001278951	NP_001155202; NP_038711
Location (UCSC)	Chr 6: 32.85 – 32.85 Mb	Chr 17: 34.41 – 34.42 Mb
PubMed search
- Wikidata
View/Edit Human	View/Edit Mouse

Transporter associated with antigen processing 1 (TAP1) is a protein that in humans is encoded by the TAP1 gene. A member of the ATP-binding cassette transporter family, it is also known as ABCB2.

== Function ==
The membrane-associated protein encoded by this gene is a member of the superfamily of ATP-binding cassette (ABC) transporters. ABC proteins transport various molecules across extra- and intra-cellular membranes. ABC genes are divided into seven distinct subfamilies (ABC1, MDR/TAP, MRP, ALD, OABP, GCN20, White). This protein is a member of the MDR/TAP subfamily. Members of the MDR/TAP subfamily are involved in multidrug resistance. The protein encoded by this gene is involved in the pumping of degraded cytosolic peptides across the endoplasmic reticulum into the membrane-bound compartment where class I molecules assemble. Mutations in this gene may be associated with ankylosing spondylitis, insulin-dependent diabetes mellitus, and celiac disease.

== See also ==
- ATP-binding cassette transporter

== Interactions ==
TAP1 has been shown to interact with:

- HLA-A, and
- Tapasin.
