= Calnexin =

Mammalian protein found in humans

CANX
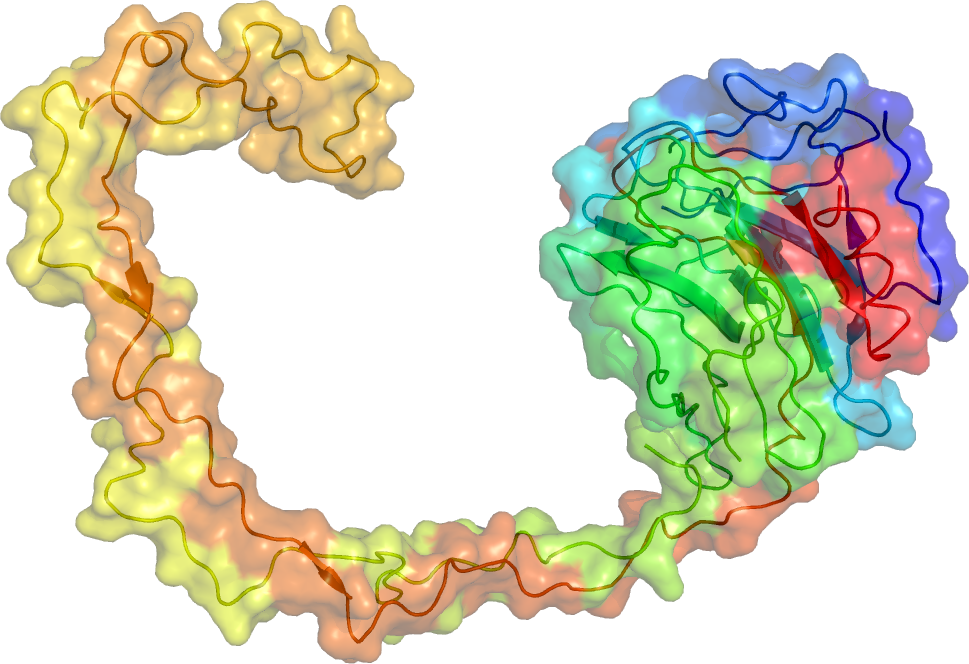

Identifiers
- Aliases: CANX, CNX, IP90, P90, calnexin
- External IDs: OMIM: 114217; MGI: 88261; GeneCards: CANX

Gene location (Human)
Chr.	Chromosome 5 (human)
Band	5q35.3	Start	179,678,628 bp
Band	5q35.3	End	179,730,925 bp

Gene location (Mouse)
Chr.	Chromosome 11 (mouse)
Band	11 B1.3|11 30.46 cM	Start	50,184,788 bp
Band	11 B1.3|11 30.46 cM	End	50,216,500 bp
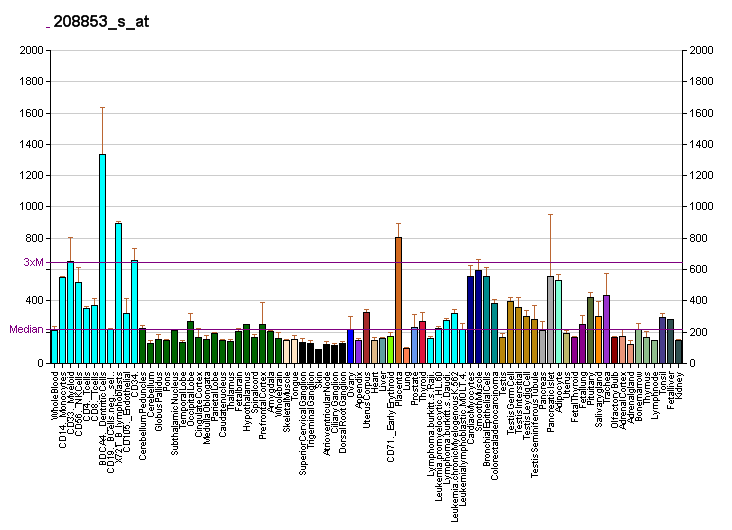

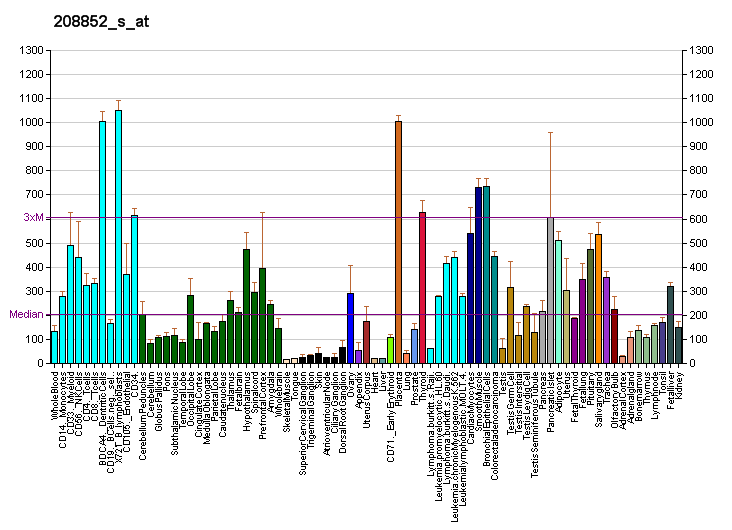
RNA expression pattern
Bgee	Human / Mouse (ortholog); Top expressed in: stromal cell of endometrium; islet of Langerhans; Achilles tendon; epithelium of colon; bone marrow cell; ventricular zone; tonsil; corpus callosum; smooth muscle tissue; sural nerve / Top expressed in: medullary collecting duct; tail of embryo; neural layer of retina; paraventricular nucleus of hypothalamus; primitive streak; Epithelium of choroid plexus; renal corpuscle; genital tubercle; gastrula; lacrimal gland; More reference expression data
BioGPS	More reference expression data
Gene ontology
Molecular function	calcium ion binding; apolipoprotein binding; unfolded protein binding; metal ion binding; ionotropic glutamate receptor binding; carbohydrate binding; RNA binding; protein binding
Cellular component	cytoplasm; integral component of membrane; mitochondria associated membranes; rough endoplasmic reticulum; ribosome; endoplasmic reticulum lumen; endoplasmic reticulum membrane; membrane; melanosome; myelin sheath; dendritic spine; smooth endoplasmic reticulum; axon; soma; endoplasmic reticulum; dendrite cytoplasm; integral component of lumenal side of endoplasmic reticulum membrane; extracellular exosome; extracellular matrix; protein-containing complex; endoplasmic reticulum quality control compartment; glutamatergic synapse; integral component of postsynaptic membrane; integral component of presynaptic active zone membrane
Biological process	antigen processing and presentation of exogenous peptide antigen via MHC class II; antigen processing and presentation of peptide antigen via MHC class I; ageing; protein folding in endoplasmic reticulum; protein secretion; clathrin-dependent endocytosis; synaptic vesicle endocytosis; protein folding; chaperone-mediated protein folding; interleukin-12-mediated signaling pathway; interleukin-27-mediated signaling pathway; interleukin-35-mediated signaling pathway
Sources:Amigo / QuickGO
Orthologs
Databases	NCBI: entry; OMA: entry
Species	Human	Mouse
Entrez	821	12330
Ensembl	ENSG00000283777; ENSG00000127022	ENSMUSG00000020368
UniProt	P27824	P35564
RefSeq (mRNA)	NM_001024649; NM_001746	NM_001110499; NM_001110500; NM_007597
RefSeq (protein)	NP_001019820; NP_001737; NP_001350922; NP_001350923; NP_001350924 NP_001350925; NP_001350926; NP_001350927; NP_001350928; NP_001350929; NP_001350930	NP_001103969; NP_001103970; NP_031623
Location (UCSC)	Chr 5: 179.68 – 179.73 Mb	Chr 11: 50.18 – 50.22 Mb
PubMed search
- Wikidata
View/Edit Human	View/Edit Mouse

Calnexin (CNX) is a 67kDa integral protein (that appears variously as a 90kDa, 80kDa, or 75kDa band on western blotting depending on the source of the antibody) of the endoplasmic reticulum (ER). It consists of a large (50 kDa) N-terminal calcium-binding lumenal domain, a single transmembrane helix and a short (90 residues), acidic cytoplasmic tail. In humans, calnexin is encoded by the gene CANX.

== Function ==
Calnexin is a chaperone, characterized by assisting protein folding and quality control, ensuring that only properly folded and assembled proteins proceed further along the secretory pathway. It specifically acts to retain unfolded or unassembled N-linked glycoproteins in the ER.

Calnexin binds only those N-glycoproteins that have GlcNAc2Man9Glc1 oligosaccharides. These monoglucosylated oligosaccharides result from the trimming of two glucose residues by the sequential action of two glucosidases, I and II. Glucosidase II can also remove the third and last glucose residue. If the glycoprotein is not properly folded, an enzyme called UGGT (for UDP-glucose:glycoprotein glucosyltransferase) will add the glucose residue back onto the oligosaccharide thus regenerating the glycoprotein's ability to bind to calnexin. The improperly-folded glycoprotein chain thus loiters in the ER and the expression of EDEM/Htm1p which eventually sentences the underperforming glycoprotein to degradation by removing one of the nine mannose residues. The mannose lectin Yos-9 (OS-9 in humans) marks and sorts misfolded glycoproteins for degradation. Yos-9 recognizes mannose residues exposed after α-mannosidase removal of an outer mannose of misfolded glycoproteins.

Calnexin associates with the protein folding enzyme ERp57 to catalyze glycoprotein specific disulfide bond formation and also functions as a chaperone for the folding of MHC class I α-chain in the membrane of the ER. As newly synthesized MHC class I α-chains enter the endoplasmic reticulum, calnexin binds on to them retaining them in a partly folded state.

After the β2-microglobulin binds to the MHC class I peptide-loading complex (PLC), calreticulin and ERp57 take over the job of chaperoning the MHC class I protein while the tapasin links the complex to the transporter associated with antigen processing (TAP) complex. This association prepares the MHC class I for binding an antigen for presentation on the cell surface.

A prolonged association of calnexin with mutant misfolded PMP22 known to cause Charcot-Marie-Tooth Disease leads to the sequestration, degradation and inability of PMP22 to traffic to the Schwann cell surface for myelination. After repeated rounds of calnexin binding, mutant PMP22 is modified by ubiquitin for degradation by the proteasome as well as a Golgi to ER retrieval pathway to return any misfolded PMP22 that escaped from the ER to the Golgi apparatus.

The x-ray crystal structure of calnexin revealed a globular lectin domain and a long hydrophobic arm extending out.

== Cofactors ==
ATP and calcium ions are cofactors involved in substrate binding for calnexin.
