= Tapasin =

Type of protein

TAPBP

Identifiers
- Aliases: TAPBP, NGS17, TAPA, TPN, TPSN, TAP binding protein (tapasin), TAP binding protein
- External IDs: OMIM: 601962; MGI: 1201689; GeneCards: TAPBP
Available structures
PDB	Ortholog search: PDBe RCSB
PDB	List of PDB id codes 3F8U

Gene location (Human)
Chr.	Chromosome 6 (human)
Band	6p21.32	Start	33,299,694 bp
Band	6p21.32	End	33,314,254 bp

Gene location (Mouse)
Chr.	Chromosome 17 (mouse)
Band	17 B1|17 17.98 cM	Start	34,134,873 bp
Band	17 B1|17 17.98 cM	End	34,148,266 bp
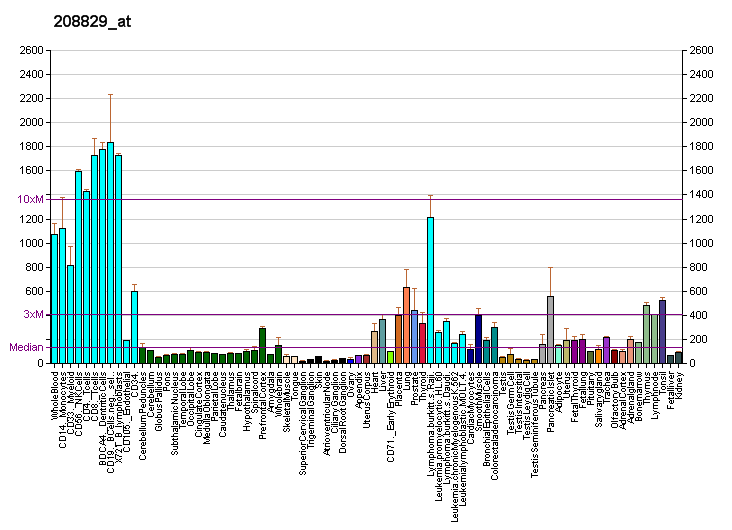

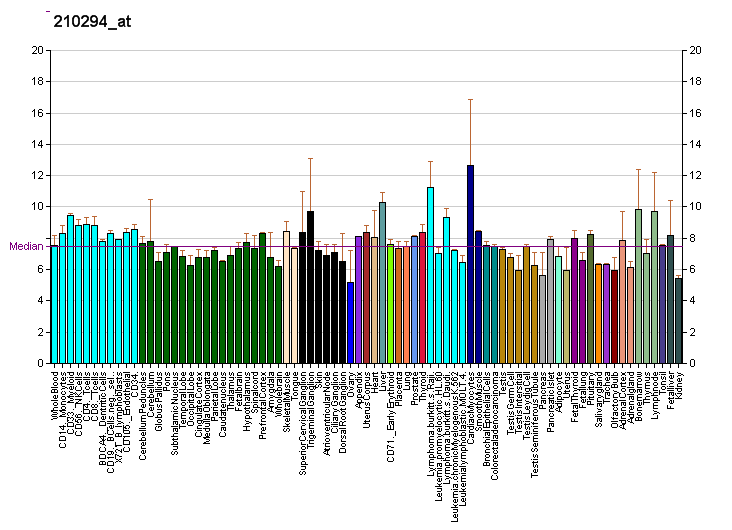
RNA expression pattern
Bgee	Human / Mouse (ortholog); Top expressed in: bone marrow cell; granulocyte; blood; spleen; mucosa of transverse colon; monocyte; appendix; lymph node; epithelium of colon; right adrenal gland / Top expressed in: mesenteric lymph nodes; Ileal epithelium; subcutaneous adipose tissue; blood; stroma of bone marrow; right lung; spleen; right lung lobe; pituitary gland; submandibular gland; More reference expression data
BioGPS	More reference expression data
Gene ontology
Molecular function	peptide antigen binding; TAP2 binding; unfolded protein binding; ABC-type peptide antigen transporter activity; protein binding; MHC class I protein binding; TAP1 binding; TAP complex binding
Cellular component	integral component of membrane; endoplasmic reticulum membrane; membrane; Golgi membrane; TAP complex; MHC class I peptide loading complex; endoplasmic reticulum; integral component of lumenal side of endoplasmic reticulum membrane; phagocytic vesicle membrane; endoplasmic reticulum-Golgi intermediate compartment membrane
Biological process	retrograde vesicle-mediated transport, Golgi to endoplasmic reticulum; antigen processing and presentation of peptide antigen via MHC class I; antigen processing and presentation of endogenous peptide antigen via MHC class I; regulation of protein complex stability; immune response; peptide antigen stabilization; regulation of gene expression; antigen processing and presentation of exogenous peptide antigen via MHC class I, TAP-dependent; vesicle fusion with endoplasmic reticulum-Golgi intermediate compartment (ERGIC) membrane; amide transport; protein-containing complex assembly; MHC class Ib protein complex assembly; peptide transport
Sources:Amigo / QuickGO
Orthologs
Databases	NCBI: entry; OMA: entry
Species	Human	Mouse
Entrez	6892	21356
Ensembl	ENSG00000231925; ENSG00000236490; ENSG00000206281; ENSG00000206208; ENSG00000112493 n/a	ENSMUSG00000024308
UniProt	O15533	Q9R233
RefSeq (mRNA)	NM_003190; NM_172208; NM_172209	NM_001025313; NM_009318
RefSeq (protein)	NP_003181; NP_757345; NP_757346	NP_001020484; NP_033344
Location (UCSC)	Chr 6: 33.3 – 33.31 Mb	Chr 17: 34.13 – 34.15 Mb
PubMed search
- Wikidata
View/Edit Human	View/Edit Mouse

TAP-associated glycoprotein, also known as tapasin or TAPBP, is a protein that in humans is encoded by the TAPBP gene.

== Function ==
The TAPBP gene encodes a transmembrane glycoprotein that mediates interaction between newly assembled major histocompatibility complex (MHC) class I molecules and the transporter associated with antigen processing (TAP), which is required for the transport of antigenic peptides across the endoplasmic reticulum membrane. This interaction facilitates optimal peptide loading on the MHC class I molecule. Up to four complexes of MHC class I and tapasin may be bound to a single TAP molecule. Tapasin contains a C-terminal double-lysine motif (KKKAE) known to maintain membrane proteins in the endoplasmic reticulum. In humans, the tapasin gene lies within the major histocompatibility complex on chromosome 6. Alternative splicing results in three transcript variants encoding different isoforms.

Tapasin is a MHC class I antigen-processing molecule present in the lumen of the endoplasmic reticulum. It plays an important role in the maturation of MHC class I molecules in the ER lumen. Tapasin is one component of the peptide-loading complex, and can be found associated with MHC class I molecules after the MHC class I heavy chain has associated with Beta_{2} microglobulin. The peptide-loading complex consists of TAP, tapasin, MHC class I, calreticulin, and ERp57. Tapasin recruits MHC class I molecules to the TAP peptide transporter, and also enhances loading of MHC class I with high-affinity peptides. Following loading of MHC class I with a high-affinity ligand, the interaction between tapasin and MHC class I disappears.

== Interactions ==
Tapasin has been shown to interact with:

- HLA-A, and
- TAP1

== See also ==
- Transporter associated with antigen processing ("TAP")
