= Monocyte =

Subtype of leukocytes

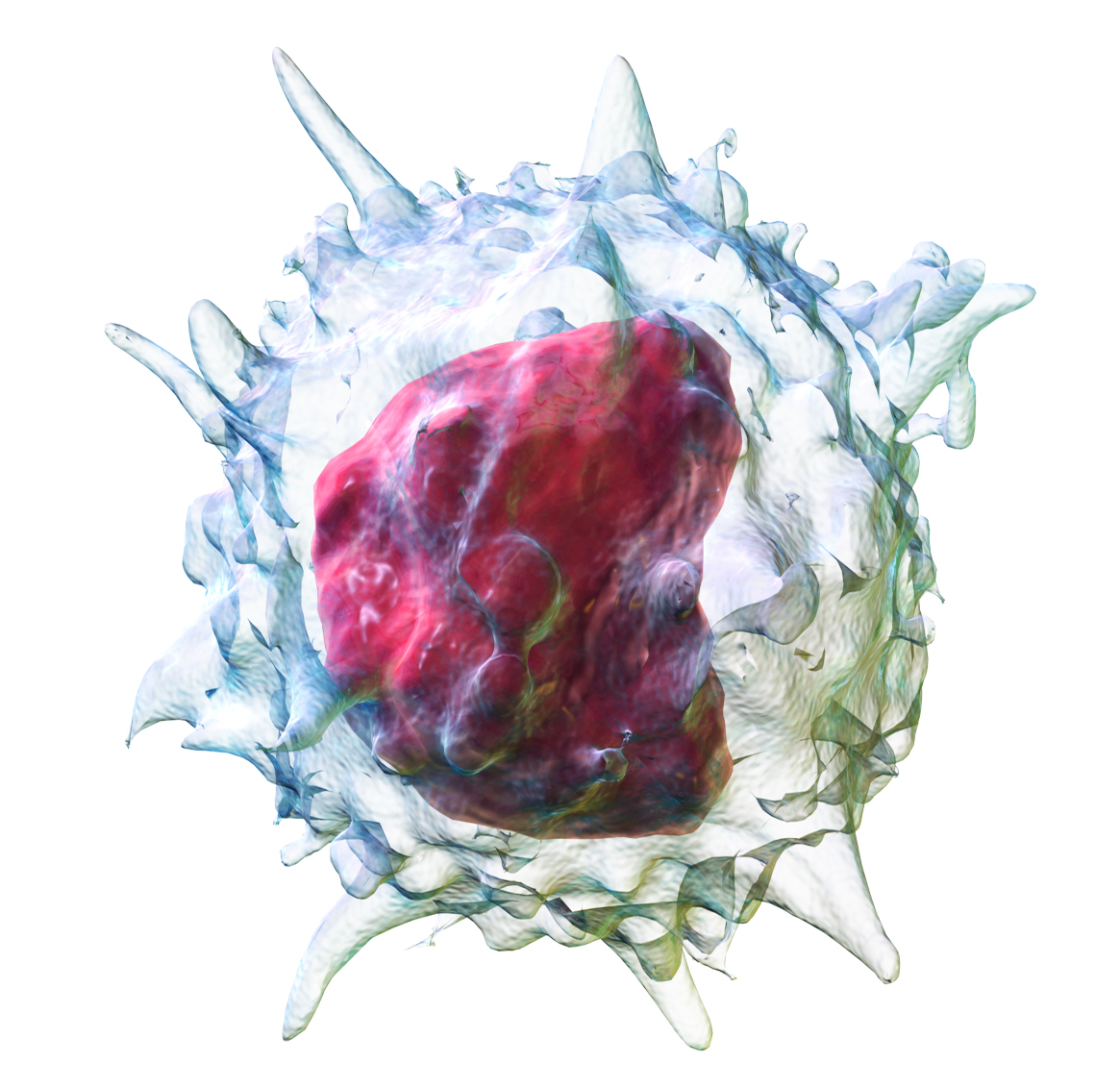
- 3D rendering of a monocyte

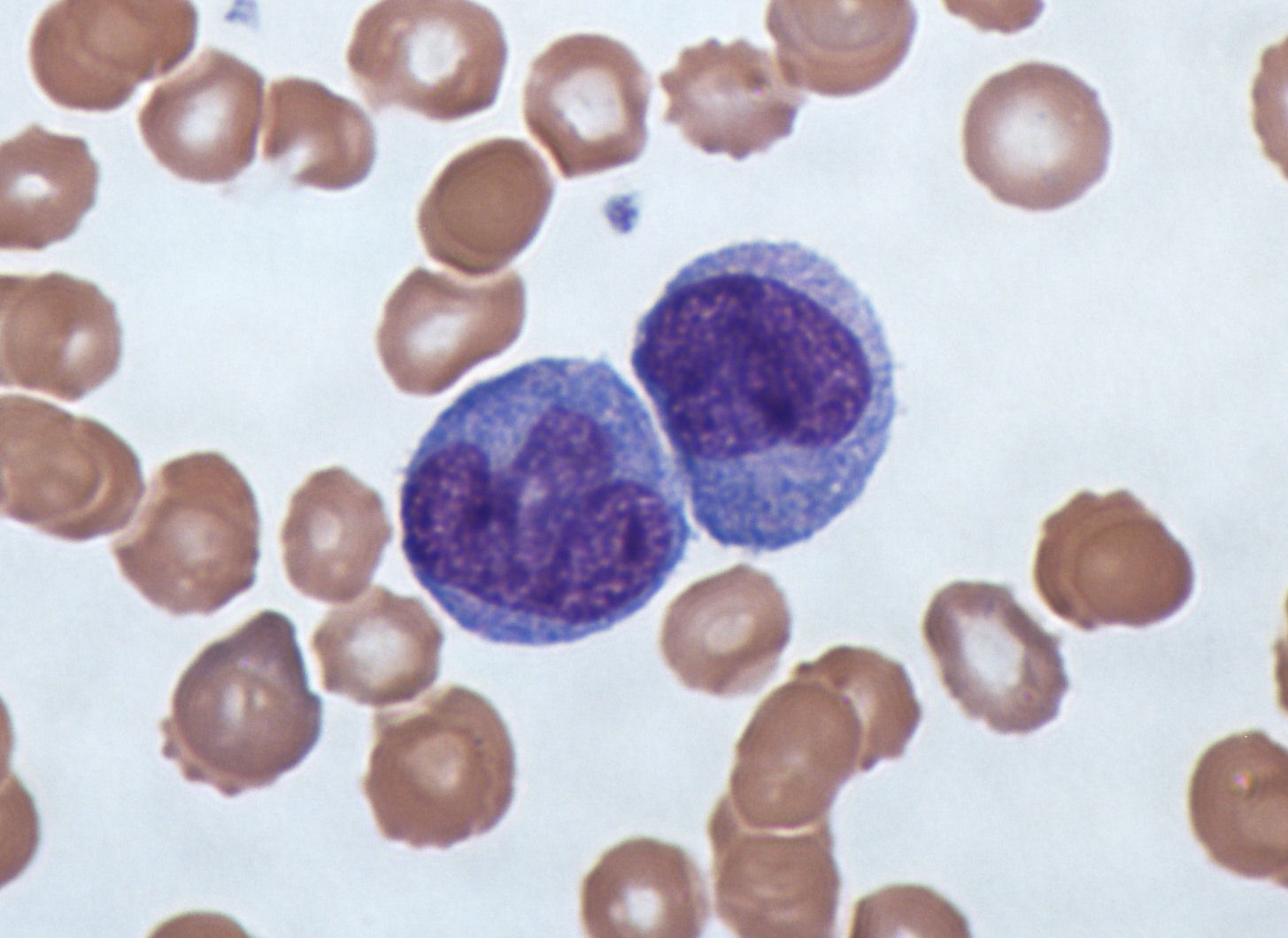
- Monocytes under a light microscope from a peripheral blood smear surrounded by red blood cells

Details
- System: Immune system

Identifiers
- MeSH: D009000
- TH: H2.00.04.1.02010
- FMA: 62864

Monocytes are a type of leukocyte or white blood cell. They are the largest type of leukocyte in the blood and can differentiate into macrophages and monocyte-derived dendritic cells. As a part of the vertebrate innate immune system monocytes also influence adaptive immune responses and exert tissue repair functions. There are at least three subclasses of monocytes in human blood based on their phenotypic receptors.

== Structure ==
Monocytes are amoeboid in appearance, and have nongranulated cytoplasm. Thus they are classified as agranulocytes, although they might occasionally display some azurophil granules and/or vacuoles. With a diameter of 15–22 μm, monocytes are the largest cell type in peripheral blood. Monocytes are mononuclear cells and the ellipsoidal nucleus is often lobulated/indented, causing a bean-shaped or kidney-shaped appearance. Monocytes compose 2% to 10% of all leukocytes in the human body.

== Development ==
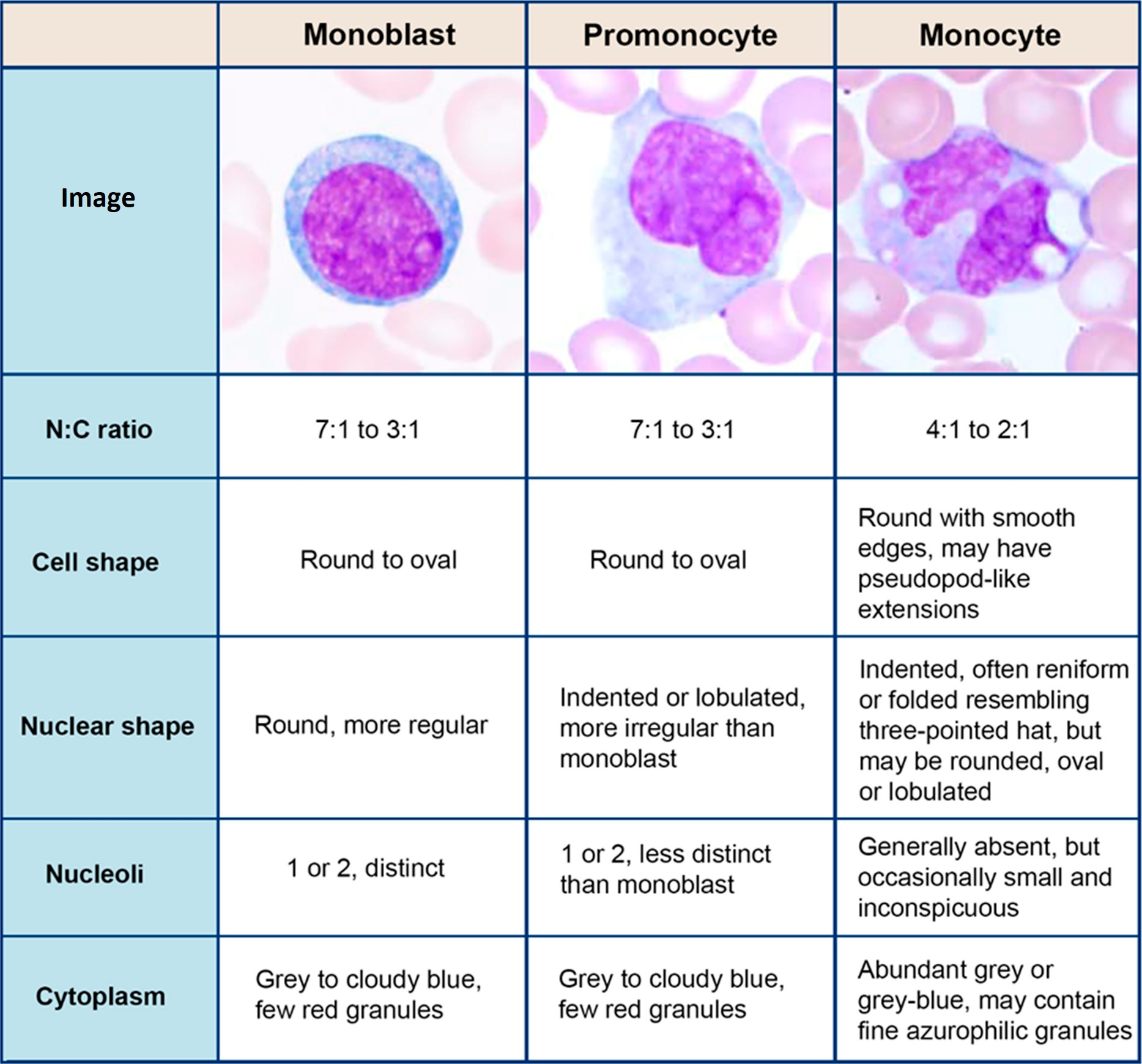
Comparison of monoblast, promonocyte and monocyte.

Monocytes are produced by the bone marrow from precursors called monoblasts, bipotent cells that differentiated from hematopoietic stem cells. Monocytes circulate in the bloodstream for about one to three days and then typically migrate into organs throughout the body where they differentiate into macrophages and dendritic cells.

== Subpopulations ==
=== In humans ===
The first clear description of monocyte subsets by flow cytometry dates back to the late 1980s, when a population of CD16-positive monocytes was described. Today, three types of monocytes are recognized in human blood:

1. The classical monocyte is characterized by high level expression of the CD14 cell surface receptor (CD14^{++} CD16^{−} monocyte)
2. The non-classical monocyte shows low level expression of CD14 and additional co-expression of the CD16 receptor (CD14^{+}CD16^{++} monocyte).
3. The intermediate monocyte expresses high levels of CD14 and low levels of CD16 (CD14^{++}CD16^{+} monocytes).

While in humans the level of CD14 expression can be used to differentiate non-classical and intermediate monocytes, the slan (6-Sulfo LacNAc) cell surface marker was shown to give an unequivocal separation of the two cell types.

Ghattas et al. state that the "intermediate" monocyte population is likely to be a unique subpopulation of monocytes, as opposed to a developmental step, due to their comparatively high expression of surface receptors involved in reparative processes (including vascular endothelial growth factor receptors type 1 and 2, CXCR4, and Tie-2) as well as evidence that the "intermediate" subset is specifically enriched in the bone marrow.

=== In mice ===
In mice, monocytes can be divided in two subpopulations. Inflammatory monocytes (CX3CR1^{low}, CCR2^{pos}, Ly6C^{high}, PD-L1^{neg}), which are equivalent to human classical CD14^{++} CD16^{−} monocytes and resident monocytes (CX3CR1^{high}, CCR2^{neg}, Ly6C^{low}, PD-L1^{pos}), which are equivalent to human non-classical CD14^{+} CD16^{+} monocytes. Resident monocytes have the ability to patrol along the endothelium wall in the steady state and under inflammatory conditions.

== Function ==
Monocytes are mechanically active cells and migrate from blood to an inflammatory site to perform their functions. As explained before, they can differentiate into macrophages and dendritic cells, but the different monocyte subpopulations can also exert specific functions on their own. In general, monocytes and their macrophage and dendritic cell progeny serve three main functions in the immune system. These are phagocytosis, antigen presentation, and cytokine production. Phagocytosis is the process of uptake of microbes and particles followed by digestion and destruction of this material. Monocytes can perform phagocytosis using intermediary (opsonising) proteins such as antibodies or complement that coat the pathogen, as well as by binding to the microbe directly via pattern recognition receptors that recognize pathogens. Monocytes are also capable of killing infected host cells via antibody-dependent cell-mediated cytotoxicity. Vacuolization may be present in a cell that has recently phagocytized foreign matter.

=== Differentiation into other effector cells ===
Monocytes can migrate into tissues and replenish resident macrophage populations. Macrophages have a high antimicrobial and phagocytic activity and thereby protect tissues from foreign substances. They are cells that possess a large smooth nucleus, a large area of cytoplasm, and many internal vesicles for processing foreign material. Although they can be derived from monocytes, a large proportion is already formed prenatally in the yolk sac and foetal liver.

In vitro, monocytes can differentiate into dendritic cells by adding the cytokines granulocyte macrophage colony-stimulating factor (GM-CSF) and interleukin 4. Such monocyte-derived cells do, however, retain the signature of monocytes in their transcriptome and they cluster with monocytes and not with bona fide dendritic cells.

=== Specific functions of monocyte subpopulations ===
Artist's impression of monocyte

Aside from their differentiation capacity, monocytes can also directly regulate immune responses. As explained before, they are able to perform phagocytosis. Cells of the classical subpopulation are the most efficient phagocytes and can additionally secrete inflammation-stimulating factors. The intermediate subpopulation is important for antigen presentation and T lymphocyte stimulation. Briefly, antigen presentation describes a process during which microbial fragments that are present in the monocytes after phagocytosis are incorporated into MHC molecules. They are then trafficked to the cell surface of the monocytes (or macrophages or dendritic cells) and presented as antigens to activate T lymphocytes, which then mount a specific immune response against the antigen. Non-classical monocytes produce high amounts of pro-inflammatory cytokines like tumor necrosis factor and interleukin-12 after stimulation with microbial products. Furthermore, a monocyte patrolling behavior has been demonstrated in humans both for the classical and the non-classical monocytes, meaning that they slowly move along the endothelium to examine it for pathogens. Said et al. showed that activated monocytes express high levels of PD-1 which might explain the higher expression of PD-1 in CD14^{+}CD16^{++} monocytes as compared to CD14^{++}CD16^{−} monocytes. Triggering monocytes-expressed PD-1 by its ligand PD-L1 induces IL-10 production, which activates CD4 Th2 cells and inhibits CD4 Th1 cell function. Many factors produced by other cells can regulate the chemotaxis and other functions of monocytes. These factors include most particularly chemokines such as monocyte chemotactic protein-1 (CCL2) and monocyte chemotactic protein-3 (CCL7); certain arachidonic acid metabolites such as leukotriene B4 and members of the 5-hydroxyicosatetraenoic acid and 5-oxo-eicosatetraenoic acid family of OXE1 receptor agonists (e.g., 5-HETE and 5-oxo-ETE); and N-Formylmethionine leucyl-phenylalanine and other N-formylated oligopeptides which are made by bacteria and activate the formyl peptide receptor 1. Other microbial products can directly activate monocytes and this leads to production of pro-inflammatory and, with some delay, of anti-inflammatory cytokines. Typical cytokines produced by monocytes are TNF, IL-1, and IL-12.

== Clinical significance ==
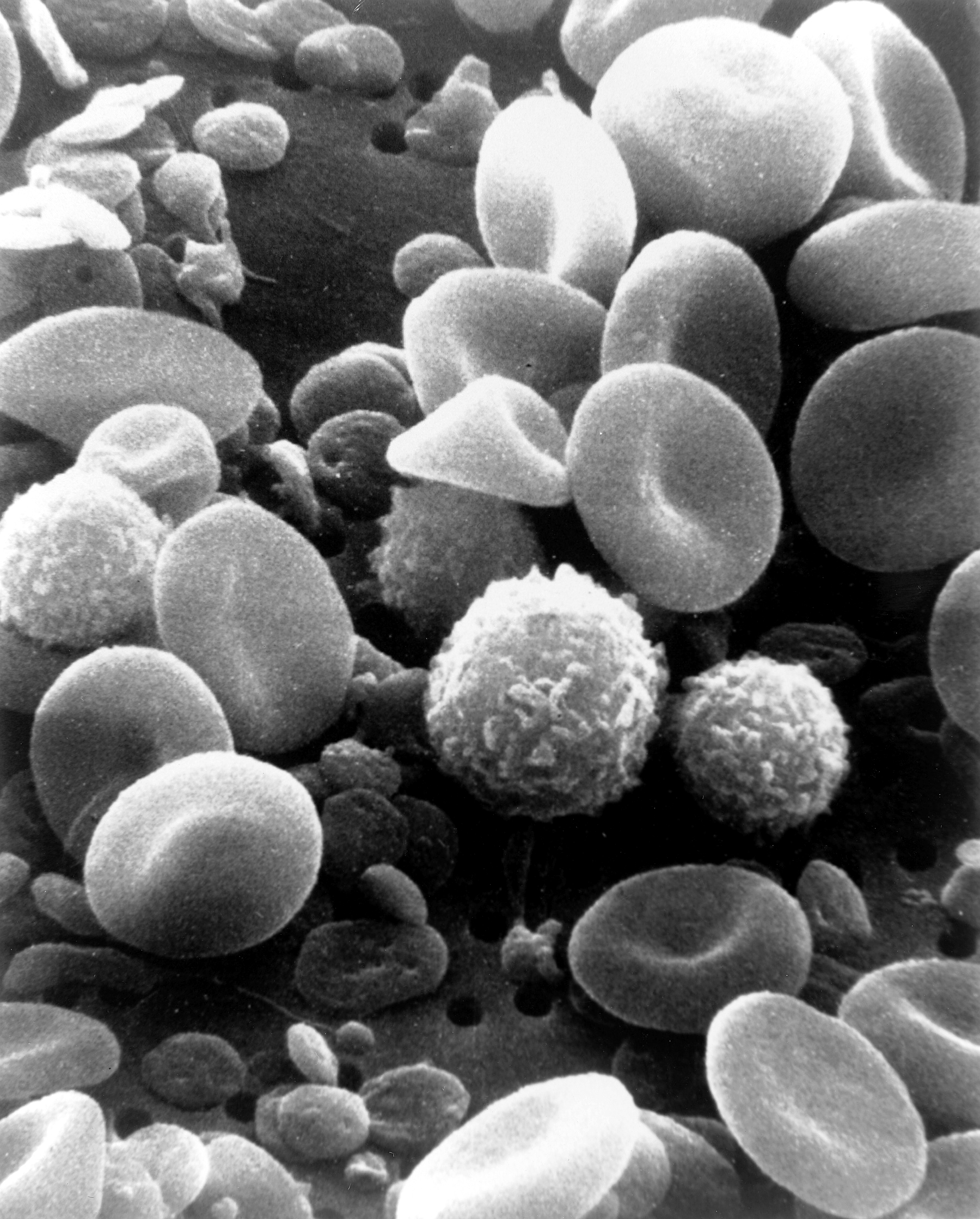
A scanning electron microscope (SEM) image of normal circulating human blood. One can see red blood cells, several knobby white blood cells including lymphocytes, a monocyte, a neutrophil, and many small disc-shaped platelets.

A monocyte count is part of a complete blood count and is expressed either as a percentage of monocytes among all white blood cells or as absolute numbers. Both may be useful, but these cells became valid diagnostic tools only when monocyte subsets are determined. Monocytic cells may contribute to the severity and disease progression in COVID-19 patients.

=== Monocytosis ===
Monocytosis is the state of excess monocytes in the peripheral blood. It may be indicative of various disease states. Examples of processes that can increase a monocyte count include:

- chronic inflammation
- diabetes
- stress response
- Cushing's syndrome (hyperadrenocorticism)
- immune-mediated disease
- granulomatous disease
- atherosclerosis
- necrosis
- red blood cell regeneration
- viral fever
- sarcoidosis
- chronic myelomonocytic leukemia (CMML)
- Resolution of fasting

A high count of CD14^{+}CD16^{++} monocytes is found in severe infection (sepsis).

In the field of atherosclerosis, high numbers of the CD14^{++}CD16^{+} intermediate monocytes were shown to be predictive of cardiovascular events in populations at risk.

CMML is characterized by a persistent monocyte count of > 1000/microL of blood. Analysis of monocyte subsets has demonstrated predominance of classical monocytes and absence of CD14lowCD16+ monocytes. The absence of non-classical monocytes can assist in diagnosis of the disease and the use of slan as a marker can improve specificity.

=== Monocytopenia ===
Monocytopenia is a form of leukopenia associated with a deficiency of monocytes. A very low count of these cells is found after therapy with immuno-suppressive glucocorticoids.

Also, non-classical slan+ monocytes are strongly reduced in patients with hereditary diffuse leukoencephalopathy with spheroids, a neurologic disease associated with mutations in the macrophage colony-stimulating factor receptor gene.

=== Blood content ===
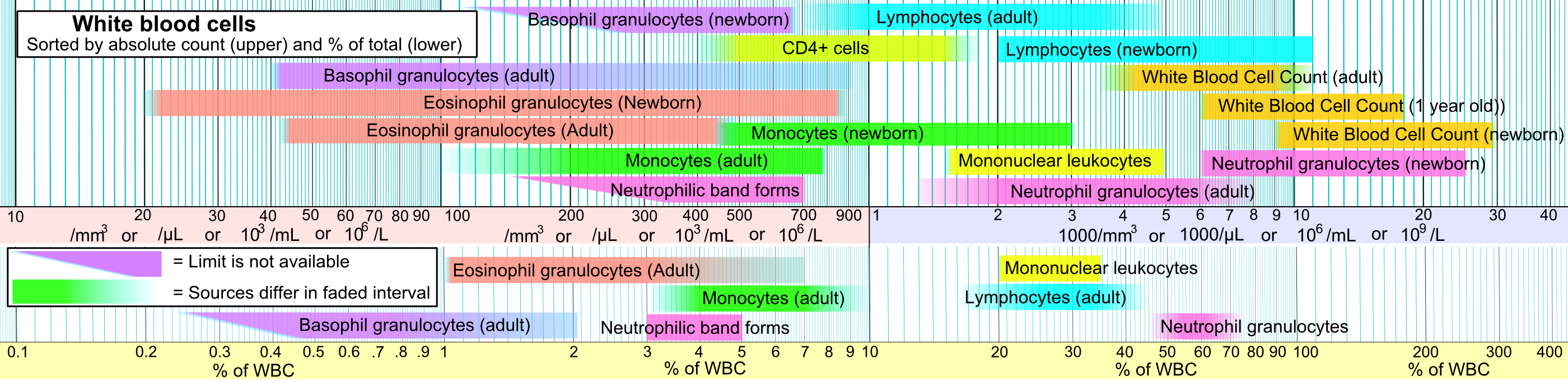
Reference ranges for blood tests of white blood cells, comparing monocyte amount (shown in green) with other cells.

== See also ==
- Complete blood count
- Hematopoiesis
- Lymphocyte
- Neutrophil granulocyte
- Phagocyte
- List of distinct cell types in the adult human body
