= Elaine Bearer =

American neurobiologist and pathologist

Elaine L. Bearer
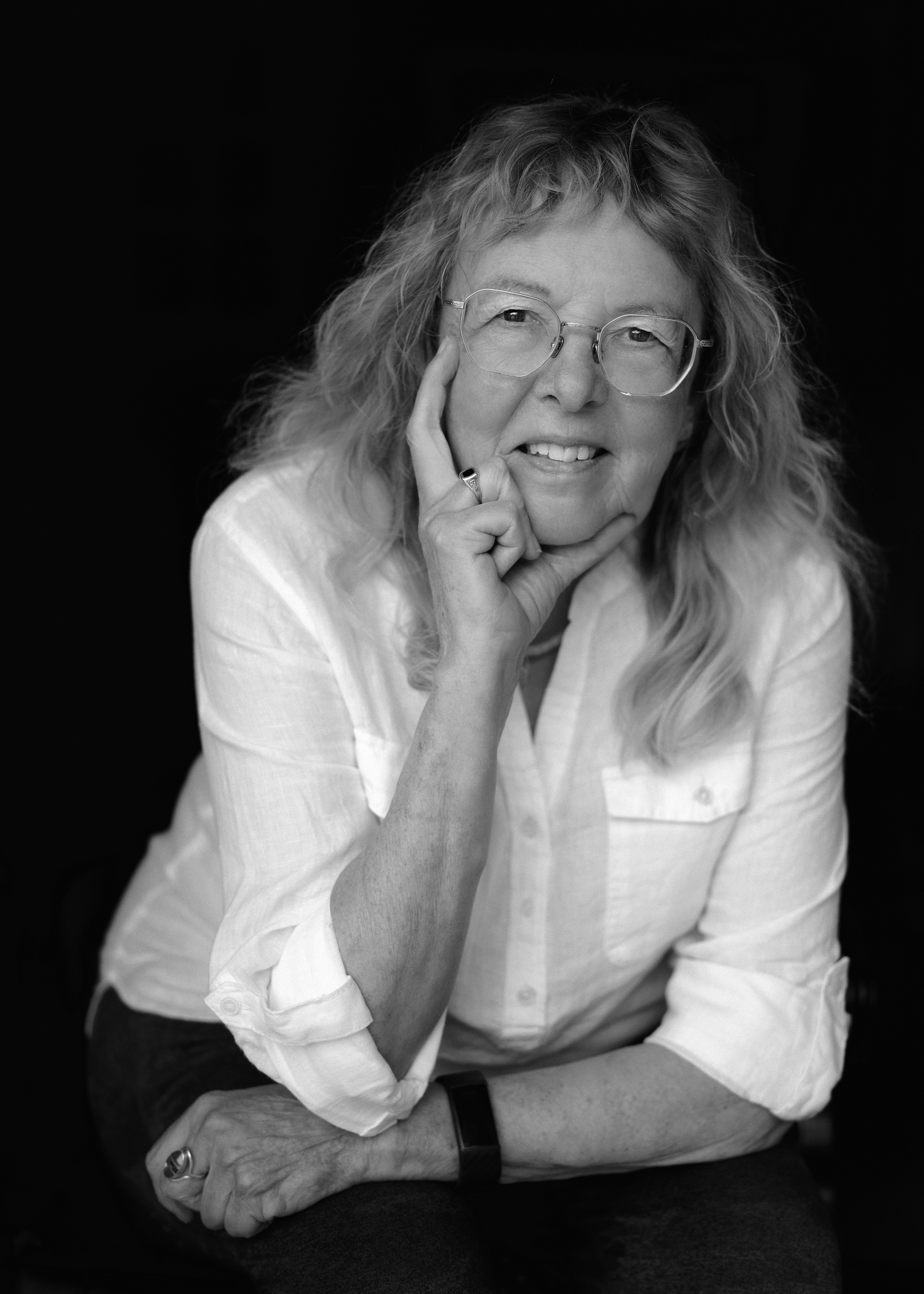
- Elaine Bearer in 2022.
- Born: Elaine Louise Bearer; Morristown, New Jersey, U.S.A.
- Education: Manhattan School of Music (BM); New York University (MA); UCSF (MD PhD)
- Scientific career
- Fields: Neuroscience; Pathology; Biochemistry; Biophysics; Cell Biology; Imaging; Medical Genetics; Musical Composition
- Workplaces: University of New Mexico, California Institute of Technology, Marine Biological Laboratory
- Theses: Structural Innovations in the String Quartets of Haydn(Master's thesis, NYU); Anionic Lipid Domains in Cell Membranes(PhD thesis, UCSF)
- Doctoral advisor: Daniel S. Friend
- Other academic advisors: Jan LaRue, Lelio Orci, Bruce Alberts, Charlie Epstein
- Website: pathology.unm.edu/faculty/faculty/ebearer.html

Elaine L. Bearer is an American brain scientist, neuropathologist, and composer of classical music.

== Education ==
Bearer received her Bachelor's of Music from The Manhattan School of Music in Theory, in June 1970. She received the Masters of Art from New York University, where her thesis was entitled Structural Innovation in the String Quartets of Haydn. Prior to studies at The Manhattan School, Bearer was a pupil of Nadia Boulanger, first at the Ecole Americaine des Beaux Arts of the Fontainebleau Schools and continuing in Boulanger's home on Rue Ballu in Paris. After several years as a tenure-track professor in music at a small liberal arts college in San Francisco, Lone Mountain College, she studied Human Biology at Stanford, was Donald Kennedy's teaching assistant, worked as a graduate research assistant in Neurobiology with John G. Nicholls and proceeded to be admitted to the combined MD-PhD Medical Scientist Training Program funded by NIH at University of California San Francisco (UCSF) ,where she graduated with the combined degree in a record 6 years.

== Career ==
After a one-year post-doctoral fellowship with Lelio Orci in Geneva, at the Centre medical universitaire (CMU), Bearer returned to UCSF for residency and fellowship training—clinically in Pathology and Medical Genetics with Charlie Epstein, and scientifically in Biochemistry and Biophysics with Bruce Alberts. She was recruited to a tenure-track position at Brown University in 1991 and rose in the ranks to full professorship in 2005. In 2009 University of New Mexico recruited her to the Harvey Family Endowed and tenured professorship and as Vice Chair for Research. She holds medical licenses in both New Mexico and California, and is Board Certified in Anatomic Pathology. She has been continuously funded by NIH since 1994.

=== Scientific contributions ===
Bearer first studied neurophysiology in John G. Nicholls' lab while at Stanford University. Bearer's early scientific contributions as a graduate student at University of California San Francisco include the first ultrastructural imaging of lipid rafts in cell membranes that mediate neuronal signaling (Bearer and Friend, J. Cell Biol., 1982); then as a post-doc the first ultrastructural imaging of endothelial fenestral diaphragms that allow transport of solutes between blood and tissue (Bearer and Orci, J. Cell Biol., 1985), and the first biochemical discovery of Arp2 and 2E4/kaptin, proteins that regulate actin dynamics in neurons (Bearer, 1992) and platelets. While a Principal Investigator in her own lab at Brown University, Bearer discovered that these proteins, initially identified while Bearer was a post-doc at UCSF, turned out to be major regulatory components of the length of stereocilia in the hearing apparatus of the inner ear.

Bearer turned to brain-wide imaging by magnetic resonance imaging in living animals over time during a sabbatical from Brown to Caltech in 2004–2005. This new venture resulted in multiple contributions since 2007 include imaging of the brain in living mouse models of human neuropsychological disorders, such as Down syndrome, Alzheimer's disease, fear to anxiety transitions, viral infections of the brain, and drugs of abuse. Together with collaborator Russell E. Jacobs, Bearer developed and deployed longitudinal manganese-enhanced magnetic resonance imaging (MEMRI) coupled with behavior, transgenic mouse models, biochemistry, and optical microscopy to explore brain-wide responses to experience and disease over time.

Since 2009, Bearer has been the Harvey Family Endowed Professor in Pathology at University of New Mexico, a visitor at California Institute of Technology. She was elected Fellow of the American Association for the Advancement of Science. in 2011, and as a fellow for American Society of Cell Biology in 2024 .Bearer is also a fellow of the College of American Pathologists.

In 2019 The Manhattan School awarded Bearer the Distinguished Alumni Award, and in 2020, she received a Campaign Alumni Award for "most audacious" from University of California, San Francisco. In 2021 she has been bestowed with an honorary professorship from The Strömstad Akademi, in Sweden, a Nordic Academy for Advanced Studies. Her newly composed string quartet premiered at the award ceremony.

=== Research details ===
Bearer's research began with studies of membrane dynamics involved in synaptic transmitter release. She developed imaging labels for anionic lipids and made the earliest observations of membrane lipid rafts. and the protein biochemistry of actin modulators During this investigation, she identified proteins that drive filament formation and mapped one, kaptin/2E4, on human chromosome 19. This work revealed that mutations in the promoter region of kaptin/2E4 lead to inherited deafness.

Using herpes simplex virus (HSV) as a tool and the squid giant axon as a model, her lab then discovered that amyloid precursor protein (AAP), whose proteolytic product Abeta is the major component of Alzheimer's plaques, recruited cytoskeletal motors to cargo for intracellular transport within axons. Live video recording of green-labeled HSV and red-labeled APP and high resolution immunogold electronmicroscopy demonstrated that intracellular HSV viral particles interact with cellular APP. Her work on HSV has led towards understanding the HSV-APP connections and its role in Alzheimer's disease.

In 2004, Bearer began developing magnetic resonance imaging with Russell E. Jacobs, John D. Roberts, and Scott E. Fraser for live imaging of circuitry in mouse models of human neurological and psychiatric disorders. Bearer and Jacobs developed manganese-enhanced magnetic resonance imaging (MEMRI) of neural connections and brain activity in transgenic mouse models of human disorders. From 2006 until 2021, Bearer and Jacobs co-authored 15 publications using MEMRI to discover alterations in hippocampal and forebrain projections. The most recent of this line of research was published in October 2025 in PNAS, detailing the effects of early life adversity on brain networks.

She is a member of the American Society for Investigative Pathology, where she has served as elected chair of various subcommittees and on Council. Since 2002, she has directed and chaired various symposia at their annual national meetings.

In 2023 she assumed leadership within the emerging New Mexico Alzehimer's Disease Research Center Director of the UNM Brain Bank, a repository she had inherited at UNM and continued to build and curate there. In 2024 the Center was awarded a $21.7 million grant from NIH for 5 years. Bearer continues to lead the Neuropathology Core for this new Center and Direct the Brain Brank. Using Brain Bank specimens, Bearer discovered nanoplastics in the human brain by microscopy accepted for publication and published in Proceedings of the International Society for Magnetic Resonance in Medicine. Bearer's discovery was inspired by and in tandem with Matt Campen at UNM College of Pharmacy, and his team, who were using pyrolysis GC/MS to identify plastics by molecular characterization in brain bank specimens. Using her novel miscorcospy technique, Bearer has since studied the realitonship between vascular pathology and the presence of plastics in white matter blood vessel walls.

Bearer's recent scientific work received media attention, including HSC Newsbreak, including, an article in C&EN news, "the fluorescent microplastics jumped out at us".

Science Publishing

Bearer assumed Editor in Chief for Biology of Natural Sciences (June 2023), a new interdisciplinary open access journal published by Wiley, . She invites and commissions interdiscipinary manuscripts in the field of Biology coupled with chemistry and/or physics. Particular interests are in MR imaging of brain in small animals for preclinical discovery and in computational image analyses, especially unbiased, comprehensive approaches with hypothesis-driven validations. Manuscripts describing processes or results investigating the behavior-brain continuum will be especially attractive.

== Music ==
Bearer is a composer, who has had performances annually of new compositions. While at Brown University from 1991 to 2009, she was a professor in both Biology and Medicine and in Music, and she holds a secondary appointment in the Music Department at University of New Mexico. Her piano concerto, Ode to the White Crown Sparrow, was premiered by Tyler Lincoln and the Symphony of the Redwoods; Ah-tosh-mit Overture for orchestra was commissioned for the 125th anniversary of University of California, San Francisco (UCSF), and performed by the UCSF Symphony under the baton of Jonathan Davis; the Magdalene Passion, an hour-long oratorio for five soloists, chorus, organ and chamber orchestra, was commissioned by the Providence Singers and premiered by Julian Wachner, conductor; Ultrasonic, a symphonic tone poem, was commissioned and performed by St Mathew's Music Guild in Pacific Palisades under the direction of Tom Neenan and multiple choral works with various instrumental accompaniments have been performed by the Pasadena Promusica led by Stephen Grimm. In March 2018, Pasadena Promusica premiered Bearer's L'alma rapita for chorus and string quartet inspired by Carlo Gesualdo, the 16-17th century madrigalist. This piece was then performed by Meritage, conducted by Brian Dehn, in Orange County, CA in June 2024. In 2024, her Canticle of Mary, a Magnificat, was premiered by Southern California Master Chorale in Anaheim, CA, and her new string Quartet, "O Moon", was performed by Avanti string quartet in Pasadena.

Bearer's piece for solo flute with interactive video projections, Density silver water, was performed as part of the John Donald Robb Composer's Showcase in New Mexico by Jesse Tatum with video projections by John B Carpenter in March 2018; and The Replication Machine, for viola-clarinet duo with readings and audience participation was presented to Bruce M. Alberts for his birthday at the Metropolitan Club in San Francisco in April 2018.

A CD of Bearer's music was issued by Albany Records. The score of her Nicholls Trio, written as a tribute to John Graham Nicholls, is published by Hildegaard Publishing Company, and the piano solo, Deep, is in press in 2026. In spring 2026, she is the keynote speaker for the El Aleph, Festival of Art and Science, in Mexico City where selections of her music will also be performed. She has over a hundred compositions, some of which may be heard on YouTube and others on SoundCloud. A commercial CD is available from Amazon, Bearer of Music (Thomas More, violinist)

Elaine L. Bearer is the daughter of Paul J. Bearer, a Bell Labs Engineer, and Dorothy Louise Campbell Hughes Bearer, poet and author, and has two sons, Jeremy Paul Bearer-Friend, and Ned Bearer Friend.
