= SIRPB1 =

Protein-coding gene in the species Homo sapiens

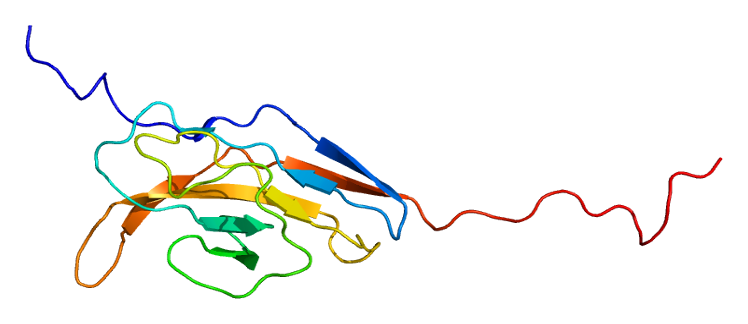

Identifiers
- Aliases: SIRPB1, CD172b, SIRP-BETA-1, signal regulatory protein beta 1
- External IDs: OMIM: 603889; MGI: 3779828; GeneCards: SIRPB1
Available structures
PDB	Human UniProt search: PDBe RCSB
PDB	List of PDB id codes 2D9C, 2JJU,%%s2JJV

Gene location (Human)
Chr.	Chromosome 20 (human)
Band	20p13	Start	1,561,385 bp
Band	20p13	End	1,620,061 bp

Gene location (Mouse)
Chr.	Chromosome 3 (mouse)
Band	3 A1|3	Start	15,560,811 bp
Band	3 A1|3	End	15,640,125 bp
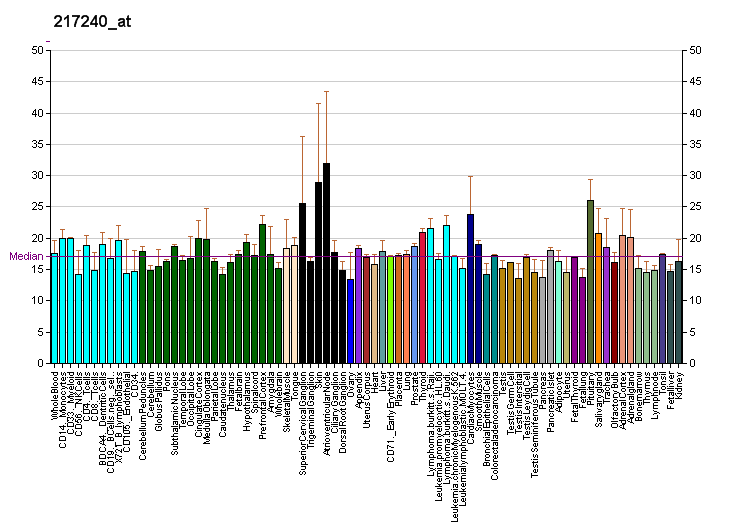

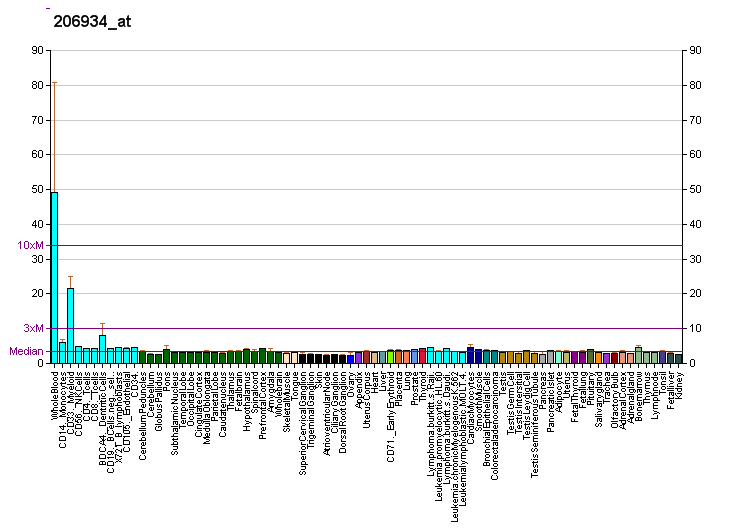
RNA expression pattern
Bgee	Human / Mouse (ortholog); Top expressed in: monocyte; granulocyte; blood; right lung; spleen; bone marrow; bone marrow cell; appendix; gallbladder; lymph node / Top expressed in: granulocyte; spermatid; secondary oocyte; primary oocyte; bone marrow; zygote; spleen; lung; jejunum; liver; More reference expression data
BioGPS	More reference expression data
Gene ontology
Molecular function	protein binding
Cellular component	integral component of membrane; plasma membrane; integral component of plasma membrane; membrane; secretory granule membrane; cell surface
Biological process	cell surface receptor signaling pathway; innate immune response; signal transduction; neutrophil degranulation; positive regulation of cell-cell adhesion; positive regulation of phagocytosis; positive regulation of T cell activation
Sources:Amigo / QuickGO
Orthologs
Databases	NCBI: entry; OMA: entry
Species	Human	Mouse
Entrez	10326	668101
Ensembl	ENSG00000101307	ENSMUSG00000095028
UniProt	O00241; Q5TFQ8	n/a
RefSeq (mRNA)	NM_001083910; NM_001135844; NM_006065; NM_001329157; NM_001330639	NM_001173460
RefSeq (protein)	NP_001077379; NP_001129316; NP_001316086; NP_001317568; NP_006056 NP_001129316.1	n/a
Location (UCSC)	Chr 20: 1.56 – 1.62 Mb	Chr 3: 15.56 – 15.64 Mb
PubMed search
- Wikidata
View/Edit Human	View/Edit Mouse

Signal-regulatory protein beta-1 is a protein that in humans is encoded by the SIRPB1 gene. SIRPB1 has also recently been designated CD172B (cluster of differentiation 172B).

The protein encoded by this gene is a member of the signal-regulatory-protein (SIRP) family, and also belongs to the immunoglobulin superfamily. SIRP family members are receptor-type transmembrane glycoproteins known to be involved in the negative regulation of receptor tyrosine kinase-coupled signaling processes. This protein was found to interact with TYROBP/DAP12, a protein bearing immunoreceptor tyrosine-based activation motifs. This protein was also reported to participate in the recruitment of tyrosine kinase SYK. Alternatively spliced transcript variants have been found for this gene.

== Interactions ==
SIRPB1 has been shown to interact with TYROBP.
