= Axonal transport =

Movement of organelles

A cellular process responsible for the movement of mitochondria, lipids, synaptic vesicles, and proteins to and from a neuron’s cell body through the cytoplasm of its axon.

Dynein, a motor protein responsible for retrograde axonal transport, carries vesicles and other cellular products toward the cell bodies of neurons. Its light chains bind the cargo, and its globular head regions bind the microtubule, "inching" along it.

Axonal transport, also called axoplasmic transport or axoplasmic flow, is the cellular process responsible for moving lipids, synaptic vesicles, proteins, mitochondria and other organelles to and from a neuron's cell body, through the cytoplasm of its axon called the axoplasm. Since some axons are on the order of meters long, neurons cannot rely on diffusion to carry products of the nucleus and organelles to the ends of their axons. Axonal transport is also responsible for moving molecules destined for degradation from the axon back to the cell body, where they are broken down by lysosomes.

Movement toward the cell body is called retrograde transport and movement toward the synapse is called anterograde transport.

== Mechanism ==
The vast majority of axonal proteins are synthesized in the neuronal cell body and transported along axons. Some mRNA translation has been demonstrated within axons. Axonal transport occurs throughout the life of a neuron and is essential to its growth and survival. Microtubules (made of tubulin) run along the length of the axon and provide the main cytoskeletal "tracks" for transportation. Kinesin and dynein are motor proteins that move cargoes in the anterograde (forwards from the soma to the axon tip) and retrograde (backwards to the soma (cell body) directions, respectively. Motor proteins bind and transport several different cargoes including mitochondria, cytoskeletal polymers, autophagosomes, and synaptic vesicles containing neurotransmitters.

Axonal transport can be fast or slow, and anterograde (away from the cell body) or retrograde (conveys materials from axon to cell body).

== Fast and slow transport ==
Vesicular cargoes move relatively fast (50–400 mm/day) whereas transport of soluble (cytosolic) and cytoskeletal proteins takes much longer (moving at less than 8 mm/day). The basic mechanism of fast axonal transport has been understood for decades but the mechanism of slow axonal transport is only recently becoming clear, as a result of advanced imaging techniques. Fluorescent labeling techniques such as fluorescence microscopy have enabled direct visualization of transport in neurons.

Studies have revealed that the movement of cytoskeletal "slow" cargoes is actually rapid but unlike fast cargoes, they pause frequently, making the overall transit rate much slower. The mechanism is known as the "Stop and Go" model of slow axonal transport, and has been extensively validated for the transport of the cytoskeletal protein neurofilament. The movement of soluble (cytosolic) cargoes is more complex, but appears to have a similar basis where soluble proteins organize into multiprotein complexes that are then conveyed by transient interactions with more rapidly moving cargoes moving in fast axonal transport. An analogy is the difference in transport rates between local and express subway trains. Though both types of train travel at similar velocities between stations, the local train takes much longer to reach the end of the line because it stops at every station whereas the express makes only a few stops on the way.

== Anterograde transport ==
Schematic of kinesin, a motor protein walking on a microtubule. Kinesin uses protein domain dynamics on nanoscales, observable by neutron spin echo spectroscopy.

Anterograde (also called "orthograde") transport is movement of molecules/organelles outward, from the cell body (also called soma) to the synapse or cell membrane.

The anterograde movement of individual cargoes (in transport vesicles) of both fast and slow components along the microtubule is mediated by kinesins. Several kinesins have been implicated in slow transport, though the mechanism for generating the "pauses" in the transit of slow component cargoes is still unknown.

There are two classes of slow anterograde transport: slow component a (SCa) that carries mainly microtubules and neurofilaments at 0.1-1 millimeters per day, and slow component b (SCb) that carries over 200 diverse proteins and actin at a rate of up to 6 millimeters per day. The slow component b, which also carries actin, are transported at a rate of 2-3 millimeters per day in retinal cell axons.

During reactivation from latency, the herpes simplex virus (HSV) enters its lytic cycle, and uses anterograde transport mechanisms to migrate from dorsal root ganglia neurons to the skin or mucosa that it subsequently affects.

A cargo-receptor for anterograde transport motors, the kinesins, has been identified as the amyloid precursor protein (APP), the parent protein that produces the senile plaques found in Alzheimer's disease. A 15-amino acid peptide in the cytoplasmic carboxyl terminus of APP binds with high affinity to conventional kinesin-1 and mediates transport of exogenous cargo in the giant axon of the squid.

Manganese, a contrast agent for T_{1}-weighted MRI, travels by anterograde transport after stereotaxic injection into the brain of experimental animals and thereby reveals circuitry by whole brain MR imaging in living animals, as pioneered by Robia Pautler, Elaine Bearer and Russ Jacobs. Studies in kinesin-light chain-1 knockout mice revealed that Mn^{2+} travels by kinesin-based transport in the optic nerve and in the brain. Transport in both hippocampal projections and in the optic nerve also depends on APP. Transport from hippocampus to forebrain is decreased in aging and destination is altered by the presence of Alzheimer's disease plaques.

== Retrograde transport ==
Retrograde transport shuttles molecules/organelles away from axon terminals toward the cell body. Retrograde axonal transport is mediated by cytoplasmic dynein, and is used for example to send chemical messages and endocytosis products headed to endolysosomes from the axon back to the cell. Operating at average in vivo speeds of approximately 2 μm/sec, fast retrograde transport can cover 10-20 centimeters per day.

Fast retrograde transport returns used synaptic vesicles and other materials to the soma and informs the soma of conditions at the axon terminals. Retrograde transport carries survival signals from the synapse back to the cell body, such as the TRK, the nerve growth factor receptor. Some pathogens exploit this process to invade the nervous system. They enter the distal tips on an axon and travel to the soma by retrograde transport. Examples include tetanus toxin and the herpes simplex, rabies, and polio viruses. In such infections, the delay between infection and the onset of symptoms corresponds to the time needed for the pathogens to reach the somata. Herpes simplex virus travels both ways in axons depending on its life cycle, with retrograde transport dominating polarity for incoming capsids.

== Consequences of interruption ==
Whenever axonal transport is inhibited or interrupted, normal physiology becomes pathophysiology, and an accumulation of axoplasm, called an axonal spheroid, may result. Because axonal transport can be disrupted in a multitude of ways, axonal spheroids can be seen in many different classes of diseases, including genetic, traumatic, ischemic, infectious, toxic, degenerative and specific white matter diseases called leukoencephalopathies. Several rare neurodegenerative diseases are linked to genetic mutations in the motor proteins, kinesin and dynein, and in those cases, it is likely that axonal transport is a key player in mediating pathology. Dysfunctional axonal transport is also linked to sporadic (common) forms of neurodegenerative diseases such as Alzheimer's and Parkinson's. This is mainly due to numerous observations that large axonal accumulations are invariably seen in affected neurons, and that genes known to play a role in the familial forms of these diseases also have purported roles in normal axonal transport. However, there is little direct evidence for involvement of axonal transport in the latter diseases, and other mechanisms (such as direct synaptotoxicity) may be more relevant.

Arrest of axoplasmic flow at the edge of ischemic areas in vascular retinopathies leads to swelling of nerve fibres, which give rise to soft exudates or cotton-wool patches.

Since the axon depends on axoplasmic transport for vital proteins and materials, injury, such as diffuse axonal injury, which interrupts the transport, will cause the distal axon to degenerate in a process called Wallerian degeneration. Cancer drugs that interfere with cancerous growth by altering microtubules (which are necessary for cell division) damage nerves because the microtubules are necessary for axonal transport.

== Infection ==
The rabies virus reaches the central nervous system by retrograde axoplasmic flow. The tetanus neurotoxin is internalised at the neuromuscular junction through binding the nidogen proteins and is retrogradely transported towards the soma in signaling endosomes. Neurotropic viruses, such as the herpesviruses, travel inside axons using cellular transport machinery, as has been shown in work by Elaine Bearer's group. Other infectious agents are also suspected of using axonal transport. Such infections are now thought to contribute to Alzheimer's disease and other neurodegenerative neurological disorders.

== See also ==
- Intraflagellar transport
