= Polycystic lipomembranous osteodysplasia with sclerosing leukoencephalopathy =

- Other names: Nasu-Hakola disease
- Specialty: Medical genetics
- Causes: mutations in either the TYROBP or TREM2 genes
- Diagnostic method: frontal atrophy of the cerebral white matter, multifocal cystic lesions on the bones of hands, wrists, feet and ankles
- Differential diagnosis: frontal-type dementia and polycystic bone lesions in the fourth decade of life
- Prognosis: fatal in the fifth decade of life
- Frequency: 1 in 500,000 to 1,000,000

Polycystic lipomembranous osteodysplasia with sclerosing leukoencephalopathy also known as Nasu–Hakola disease is a rare disease characterised by early-onset dementia and multifocal bone cysts. It is caused by autosomal recessive loss of function mutations in either the TREM2 or TYROBP gene that are found most frequently in the Finnish and Japanese populations.

== Signs and symptoms ==
Symptoms appear in four stages over the course of the disease. The first (latent stage) is asymptomatic and lasts up to the early 20s. The second stage (osseous stage) is characterized by persistent bone pain, usually accompanied by pathological fractures of these bones. Bones of the hands, feet, wrists, and ankles are typically affected first, then followed by the arms and legs. The third stage (early neurologic) is marked by the onset of symptoms typical of a frontal lobe syndrome (euphoria, lack of concentration, loss of judgment and social inhibitions) with memory loss. Epilepsy may occur during this period but are transient. This stage usually has its onset in the late 20s and early 30s. The final stage (late neurologic) is characterized by severe dementia and paralysis. Death usually occurs in the late 40s or early 50s.

== Genetics ==
This condition has been associated with 2 different loss of function mutations in the TYRO protein tyrosine kinase binding protein (TYROBP) gene and in the triggering receptor expressed on myeloid cells 2 (TREM2) gene. TYROBP is located on the long arm of chromosome 19 (19q13.12) and TREM2 is located on short arm of chromosome 6 (6p21.1). TYROBP codes for the DAP12 adaptor protein, and TREM2 codes for the cell-surface receptor. Mutations in either gene produce the same clinical symptoms and manifestation of the disease.

== Pathophysiology ==
The pathophysiology of the disease is not well understood, however, microglial dysfunction has been associated with the disease. TREM2 is an important receptor that plays a role in the regulation of proliferation, phagocytic activity, and lipid metabolism of microglia. Activation of TREM2 on microglia can promote phagocytosis of debris in the central nervous system. Therefore, lack of TREM2 expression in this disease results in dysfunctional microglia that cannot effectively clear out neuronal debris. Specifically, these microglia lacking TREM2 cannot remove myelin debris, eventually leading to the lack of remyelination. The disease ultimately causes robust loss of white matter and axons, specifically in anterior brain regions like the frontal, parietal, and some of the temporal lobes.

Lack of TREM2 expression also has effects on the bones, such that osteoclasts, the cells that break down damaged bone, also normally express TREM2. TREM2/DAP12 signaling is involved in the differentiation of osteoclasts, and the lack of TREM2 alters the generation of osteoclasts, which results in the bone cysts seen in the disease.

== Diagnosis ==
The disease is diagnosed on the basis of both the bone and neurological symptoms. X-Ray images typically show symmetrical cystic lesions present on the bones of the extremities. MRI and CT scans of the brain will show global brain atrophy, that is particularly prominent in the frontal lobes. Bilateral calcifications of the basal ganglia are also prominent. These brain imaging scans can also reveal diffuse white matter loss and enlargement of ventricles. EEG typically shows normal results in early disease stages, but epileptic seizure activity can be detected later. Genetic testing can be used to confirm the diagnosis, through detection of the TREM2 or TRYOBP mutation.

=== Differential diagnosis ===
- Frontotemporal dementia

=== Investigations ===
X rays show the presence of bone cysts and osteoporosis. CT or MRI of the brain show loss of tissue in the frontotemporal lobes of the brain. Calcification of the basal ganglia is common. EEG is typically normal initially but diffuse slowing and irritative activity later.

== Treatment ==
There is no cure for this condition. Bone grafts can be used to temporarily treat the cysts and pain in the extremities.

== Epidemiology ==
This condition is considered to be rare, with ~200 cases described in the literature. The estimated population prevalence is 2.0 × 10^{−6} in Finland. Most cases have originated in individuals of consanguineous parents in either Finland or Japan.
