= John Graham Nicholls =

Physiologist (1929–2023)

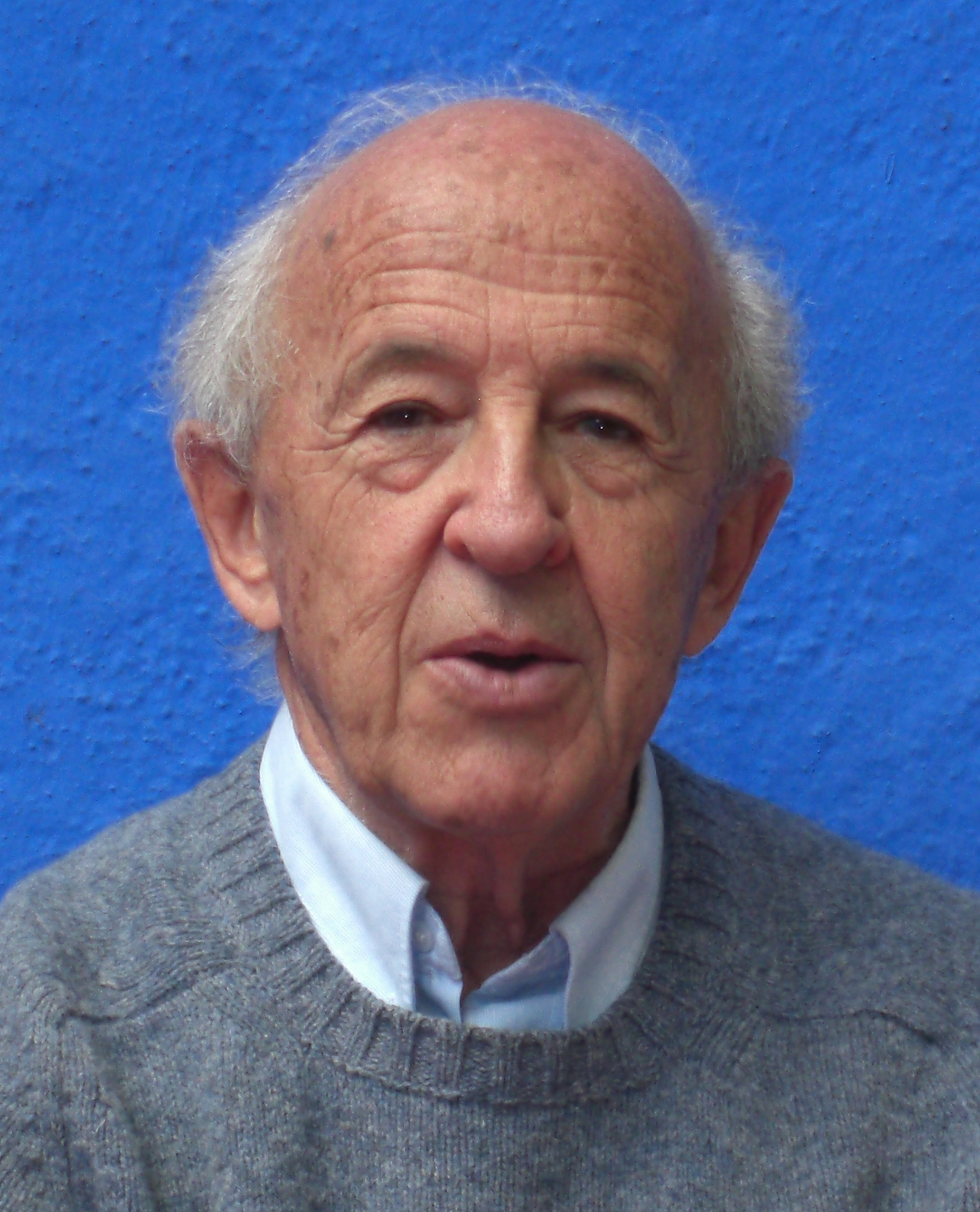
- Nicholls in 2007
- Born: 19 December 1929; London, England
- Died: 13 July 2023 (aged 93); Trieste, Italy
- Education: King's College London; Charing Cross Hospital; University College London
- Scientific career
- Fields: Physiology, Neuroscience
- Workplaces: University College London, Charing Cross Hospital, University of Oxford, Harvard University, Yale University, Stanford University, Biozentrum University of Basel, International School for Advanced Studies

John Graham Nicholls FRS (19 December 1929 – 13 July 2023) was a British, American and Swiss physiologist and neuroscientist.

== Life ==
Nicholls was a professor emeritus of physiology. He was educated at Berkhamsted School and King's College London. He received his MD from Charing Cross Hospital and a PhD from the Department of Biophysics at University College London in 1955. He worked at University College London, and the universities of Oxford, Harvard, Yale, and Stanford. In 1983 he became professor of pharmacology at the Biozentrum University of Basel. After reaching emeritus status in 1998, he was professor of neurobiology at the International School for Advanced Studies in Trieste, Italy, where he lived until his death. The International Brain Research Organization named a fellowship in his honor and he was a Fellow of the Royal Society.

Nicholls died on 13 July 2023, at the age of 93. Some of the many students and postdoctoral fellows he trained are listed on his Neurotree page.

== Work ==
Nicholls was best known for his research in the field of neurobiology. In invertebrate and mammalian nervous systems he studied synaptic transmission as well as the problem of why neurons in the mammalian brain and spinal cord fail to regenerate after injury, in contrast to the precise regeneration of synaptic connections that he was the first to demonstrate using the leech. For his studies he developed a new type of mammalian central nervous system (CNS) preparation that allowed the investigation of mechanisms involved in neurite outgrowth and CNS regeneration. In later years he started to study how the rhythm of respiration is generated by the nervous system. Additionally, he authored the book From Neuron to Brain, through its fifth edition and wrote an introduction for the sixth.

== Awards & honors ==
- 1988 Fellow of the Royal Society
- 2003 John Nicholls Fellowship
- 2007 D.Sc. Honoris Causa, University of Trieste
- 2010 Society for Neuroscience Award for Education in Neuroscience
- 2011 Endowed John G. Nicholls Lecture

== Books ==
- Kuffler S., Nicholls JG. From neuron to brain. Sinauer Associates Inc., U.S.; 1st edition (12 August 1976)
- Kuffler S., Nicholls JG. From neuron to brain. Sinauer Associates Inc., U.S.; 2nd edition (1 May 1984)
- Nicholls JG., Martin R. From neuron to brain. Sinauer Associates Inc; 3rd edition (September 1992)
- Nicholls JG., Martin R. From neuron to brain. Sinauer Associates; 4th edition (15 January 2001)
- Nicholls JG., Martin R. From neuron to brain. Sinauer Associates is an imprint of Oxford University Press; 5 edition (7 November 2011)
