= TREM2 =

Protein-coding gene in the species Homo sapiens

Identifiers
- Aliases: TREM2, TREM-2, Trem2a, Trem2b, Trem2c, triggering receptor expressed on myeloid cells 2, PLOSL2
- External IDs: OMIM: 605086; MGI: 1913150; GeneCards: TREM2

Gene location (Human)
Chr.	Chromosome 6 (human)
Band	6p21.1	Start	41,158,506 bp
Band	6p21.1	End	41,163,186 bp

Gene location (Mouse)
Chr.	Chromosome 17 (mouse)
Band	17|17 C	Start	48,653,429 bp
Band	17|17 C	End	48,661,175 bp
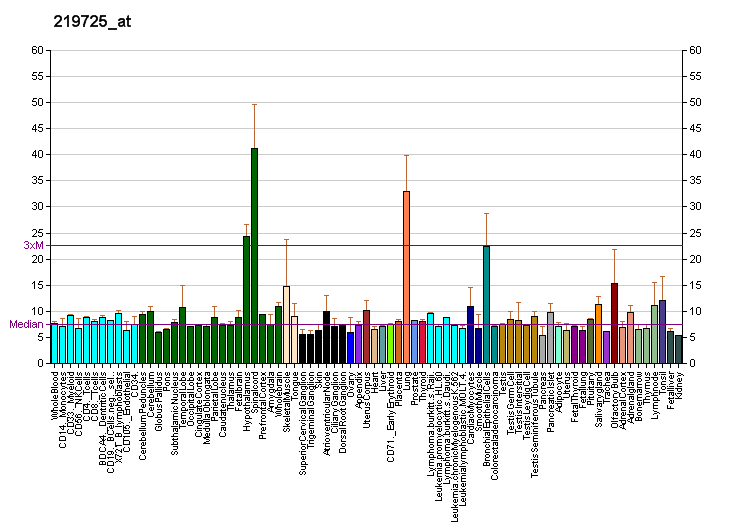
RNA expression pattern
Bgee	Human / Mouse (ortholog); Top expressed in: C1 segment; amniotic fluid; inferior ganglion of vagus nerve; substantia nigra; optic nerve; right coronary artery; gallbladder; left adrenal gland; subthalamic nucleus; upper lobe of left lung / Top expressed in: white adipose tissue; striatum of neuraxis; hippocampus proper; urinary bladder; dentate gyrus of hippocampal formation granule cell; corpus callosum; superior frontal gyrus; mesenchyme; ovary; olfactory bulb; More reference expression data
BioGPS	More reference expression data
Gene ontology
Molecular function	scaffold protein binding; lipopolysaccharide binding; lipoteichoic acid binding; peptidoglycan binding; phospholipid binding; signaling receptor activity; amyloid-beta binding; high-density lipoprotein particle binding; lipid binding; low-density lipoprotein particle binding; apolipoprotein binding; apolipoprotein A-I binding; very-low-density lipoprotein particle binding; protein-containing complex binding; lipoprotein particle binding; protein tyrosine kinase binding; protein binding
Cellular component	integral component of membrane; membrane; extracellular region; plasma membrane; integral component of plasma membrane; intrinsic component of plasma membrane
Biological process	dendritic cell differentiation; positive regulation of CD40 signaling pathway; positive regulation of calcium-mediated signaling; positive regulation of C-C chemokine receptor CCR7 signaling pathway; phagocytosis, engulfment; detection of peptidoglycan; humoral immune response; cellular response to lipoteichoic acid; positive regulation of protein localization to plasma membrane; regulation of immune response; positive regulation of peptidyl-tyrosine phosphorylation; detection of lipoteichoic acid; innate immune response; detection of lipopolysaccharide; cellular response to peptidoglycan; positive regulation of antigen processing and presentation of peptide antigen via MHC class II; positive regulation of ERK1 and ERK2 cascade; signal transduction; osteoclast differentiation; positive regulation of macrophage fusion; positive regulation of amyloid-beta clearance; positive regulation of protein phosphorylation; regulation of gene expression; negative regulation of autophagy; positive regulation of gene expression; positive regulation of mitochondrion organization; regulation of TOR signaling; positive regulation of TOR signaling; regulation of interleukin-6 production; regulation of peptidyl-tyrosine phosphorylation; positive regulation of chemotaxis; regulation of resting membrane potential; positive regulation of astrocyte activation; regulation of macrophage inflammatory protein 1 alpha production; import into cell; regulation of plasma membrane bounded cell projection organization; positive regulation of proteasomal protein catabolic process; positive regulation of inward rectifier potassium channel activity; regulation of intracellular signal transduction; positive regulation of microglial cell activation; negative regulation of autophagic cell death; positive regulation of microglial cell migration; cellular response to amyloid-beta; positive regulation of CAMKK-AMPK signaling cascade; positive regulation of ATP biosynthetic process; apoptotic cell clearance; positive regulation of protein secretion; microglial cell activation; response to ischemia; negative regulation of interleukin-1 beta production; negative regulation of tumor necrosis factor production; positive regulation of interleukin-10 production; negative regulation of apoptotic process; positive regulation of osteoclast differentiation; positive regulation of NIK/NF-kappaB signaling; microglial cell activation involved in immune response; defense response to bacterium; regulation of innate immune response; positive regulation of phagocytosis, engulfment; microglial cell proliferation; amyloid-beta clearance; complement-mediated synapse pruning; neuroinflammatory response; positive regulation of neuroinflammatory response; positive regulation of engulfment of apoptotic cell
Sources:Amigo / QuickGO
Orthologs
Databases	NCBI: entry; OMA: entry
Species	Human	Mouse
Entrez	54209	83433
Ensembl	ENSG00000095970	ENSMUSG00000023992
UniProt	Q9NZC2	Q99NH8
RefSeq (mRNA)	NM_001271821; NM_018965	NM_001272078; NM_031254
RefSeq (protein)	NP_001258750; NP_061838	NP_001259007; NP_112544
Location (UCSC)	Chr 6: 41.16 – 41.16 Mb	Chr 17: 48.65 – 48.66 Mb
PubMed search
- Wikidata
View/Edit Human	View/Edit Mouse

Triggering receptor expressed on myeloid cells 2 (TREM2) is a protein that in humans is encoded by the TREM2 gene. TREM2 is expressed on macrophages, immature monocyte-derived dendritic cells, osteoclasts, and microglia, which are immune cells in the central nervous system. In the liver, TREM2 is expressed by several cell types, including macrophages, that respond to injury. In the intestine, TREM2 is expressed by myeloid-derived dendritic cells and macrophage. TREM2 is overexpressed in many tumor types and has anti-inflammatory activities. It might therefore be a good therapeutic target.

== Gene ==
The TREM2 gene lies on the sixth chromosome in humans, specifically in location 6p21.1. The gene has 5 coding exon regions. Alternative splicing of the TREM2 mRNA transcript leads to different isoforms of the protein being produced upon translation. Specifically, TREM2 mRNA has 3 different isoforms containing 3 consistent exons, and 2 that vary between the isoforms. TREM2 mRNA is most highly expressed in brain, lungs, adrenal glands, placenta, gall bladder, and colon. The functions of TREM2 have been studied in mice with disruption or mutation of the mouse ortholog, Trem2. TREM2 orthologs are also present in rat, dog, Rhesus monkey, macaque, chimpanzee, and other animals.

== Structure ==
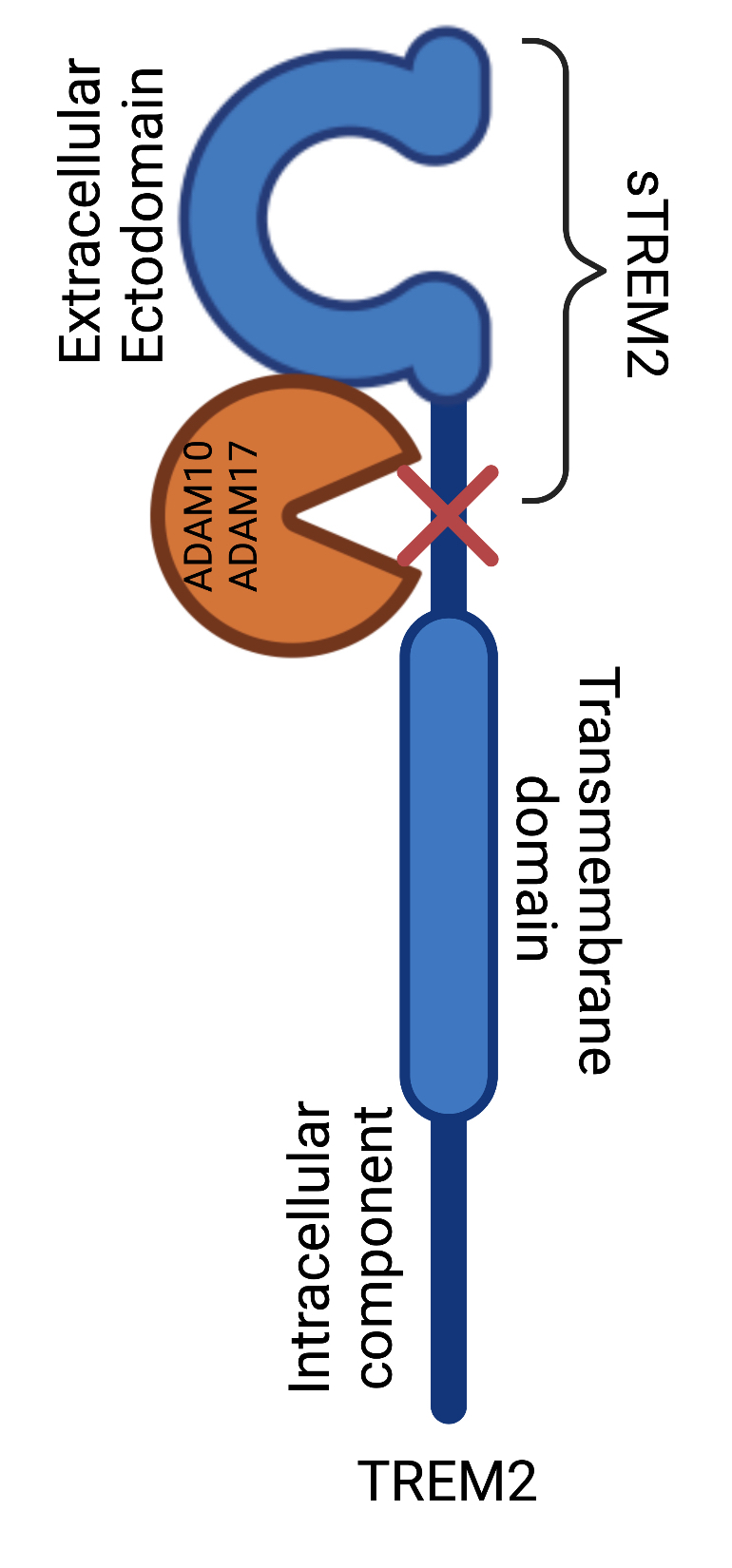
The TREM2 receptor with the ADAM10 and ADAM17 enzymes that create the soluble TREM2 fragment. Created with BioRender.com

The TREM2 receptor is a transmembrane protein that is made up of an extracellular region (also referred to as the ectodomain), the membrane-traversing segment, and an intracellular component. The extracellular component of TREM2 can bind different anionic ligands, specifically glycoproteins and lipids. This ectodomain component includes an Ig-like V-type domain, where ligands bind the receptor. The TREM2 ectodomain is modified after protein translation; these modifications affect its affinity for different ligands. The intracellular component of TREM2 does not have any signaling ability on its own; rather, it signals via the DNAX activator proteins 10 and 12 (DAP10 and DAP12). A single TREM2 molecule can interact with DAP10 and DAP12 at the same time.

Part of the ectodomain of TREM2 can be processed by enzymes (ADAM10, ADAM17) and released as a soluble version, called soluble TREM2 (sTREM2). This protein fragment is released into the serum and cerebral spinal fluid (CSF), and might serve as a biomarker for neurodegenerative and other disorders, but further studies are needed.

== Function ==
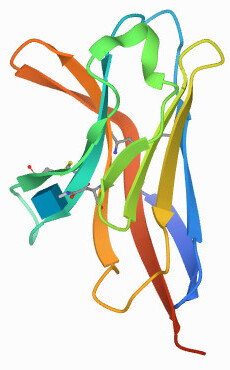
TREM2 structure as identified with X-ray crystallography. Image available through RCSB PDB.

The TREM2 protein is found in immune cells termed myeloid cells, which include macrophages, granulocytes, monocytes, and dendritic cells. Monocyte-, macrophage-, and neutrophil-mediated inflammatory responses can be stimulated through G protein-linked 7-transmembrane receptors (e.g., FPR1), Fc receptors, CD14, toll like receptors (such as TLR4), and cytokine receptors (e.g., IFNGR1). Engagement of these receptors can also prime myeloid cells to respond to other stimuli. Myeloid cells express receptors belonging to the immunoglobulin (Ig) superfamily, such as TREM2, or to the C-type lectin superfamily.

On myeloid cells, TREM2 binds anionic molecules, free and bound to plasma membrane, including bacterial products, DNA, lipoproteins, phospholipids, glycoproteins, DNA, and bacterial fragments. TREM2 binding of ligand results in phosphorylation at 2 tyrosines in the immunoreceptor tyrosine-based activation motif (ITAM) of DAP12 by SRC tyrosine kinases. Spleen tyrosine kinase (Syk) interacts with these phosphorylation sites and activates the phosphatidylinositol-3 kinase (PI3K) signaling pathway, as well as other signaling molecules such as mTOR, MAPK, and ERK. Association of TREM2 with DAP10 also activates the PI3K signaling pathway, leading to expression of transcription factors that include AP1, NF-κB, and NFAT. The PI3K signaling pathway also increases intracellular calcium content, which activates calcium-dependent kinases. TREM2 activation also affects expression of GAL1, GAL3, IL1RN, and progranulin, which modulate the immune response.

TREM2 is expressed by microglia and osteoclasts, and is involved in development and/or maintenance of brain and bone. In mice, TREM2 is involved in synaptic pruning, a process of shaping neuronal circuitry by microglia- and astrocyte-mediated removal of excessive synapses via phagocytosis. In brain, the highest levels of TREM2 are found in hippocampus, white matter, and the spinal cord, and levels of TREM2 increase with age in humans and mice. TREM2 is also expressed by macrophages of adipose tissue, adrenal gland, and placenta.

Immunosuppressive tumor-associated macrophages (TAMs) have been characterized by expression of TREM2. TREM2 signaling leads to downregulated transcription of genes that promote inflammation (Tnf, Il1b, and Nos2), as well as release of cytokines that prevent activation of anti-tumor CD8^{+} T cells. TREM2^{+} immunosuppressive TAMs correlate with the level of exhausted T cells in the human tumor microenvironment (TME). A TREM2^{+} TAM-rich TME therefore appears to be immune suppressive and might promote resistance to cancer therapies, such as checkpoint inhibitors.

TREM2 signaling can antagonize TLR expression and signaling, resulting in reduced production of inflammatory cytokines by cultured mouse macrophages. Conversely, TREM2 expression is reduced following inflammatory signaling induction by lipopolysaccharide (a TLR4 ligand) or interferon gamma (IFNG). The neuroprotective effects of TREM2 involve not only production of anti-inflammatory cytokines, but also clearance of abnormal proteins and phagocytosis of apoptotic neurons.

In contrast to anti-inflammatory effects in brain and cancer, TREM2 signaling has been reported to contribute to intestinal inflammation and development of inflammatory bowel diseases (IBD). sTREM2 is believed to negatively regulate TREM2 signaling by acting as decoy receptors. sTREM might therefore have pro-inflammatory effects. sTREM2 has been indicated in activating signaling pathways such as PI3K and ERK through an unidentified receptor. Levels of sTREM2 are increased in CSF of patients with Alzheimer's disease, and correlate with the CSF levels of disease biomarkers, such as t-tau and p-tau.

== Clinical significance ==
TREM2 signaling has been associated with pathogenesis of several diseases. Variants of in the DAP12 (TYROBP) or TREM2 genes have been associated with polycystic lipomembranous osteodysplasia with sclerosing leukoencephalopathy (PLOSL or Nasu–Hakola disease).

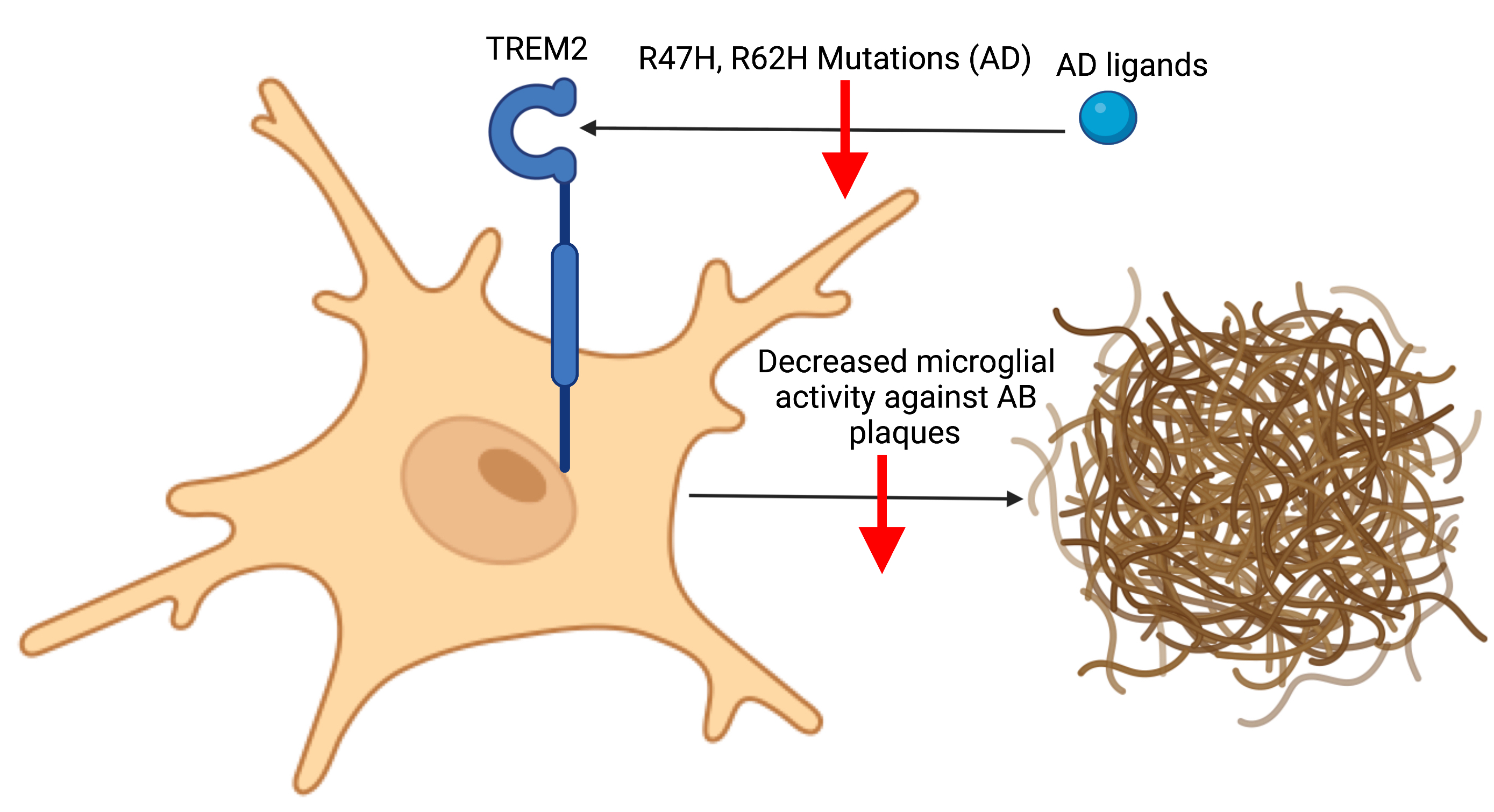
Mutations in TREM2 associated with Alzheimer's disease lead to decreased binding affinity for ligands, resulting in reduced microglial responses to amyloid-beta plaques. Created with BioRender.com

=== Alzheimer's disease ===
Missense variants of TREM2, most prominently R47H, increase the risk for Alzheimer's disease (AD). TREM2 is involved in the microglial response to the amyloid plaques that are characteristic of AD. Loss of TREM2 function reduces the responses of microglia to plaques, thought to increase plaque toxicity and damage to neurites. Expression of TREM2 is associated with that of CD33.

=== Cancer ===
Although TREM2 expression is low in most normal tissues, it is overexpressed in many human tumor types. An analysis of levels of TREM2 mRNA in 33 cancer tissues from The Cancer Genome Atlas (TCGA) indicate higher levels of expression in tumor vs normal tissues in 18 cancer types, including head and neck squamous cell carcinoma, colon adenocarcinoma, and glioblastoma, as well as gynecologic, liver, gastric, kidney, breast, bladder, and esophageal cancers. High expression of TREM2 was associated with shorter survival times of patients with ovarian cancer, gastric cancer, lower-grade glioma, hepatocellular carcinoma, or renal clear cell carcinoma. Tumor infiltration by TREM2^{+}, APOE^{+}, C1q^{+} macrophage was reported to be a biomarker for recurrence of clear-cell renal carcinoma. TREM2^{+} macrophages from human tumors also express CD68, CD163, CSF1R, and nuclear MAFB.

=== IBD ===
TREM2 expressed by human monocyte dendritic cells in the intestine. Expression of TREM2 is limited to inflamed sections of intestine and contribute to IBD development. TREM2 is associated with increased production of inflammatory cytokines and changes in the gut microbiota.

=== Liver disease ===
One feature of liver disease is the initiation of an inflammatory process, leading to fibrosis and steatohepatitis. In mouse models of nonalcoholic steatohepatitis (NASH), disease development was associated with liver infiltration by monocyte-derived macrophages and increased expression of Trem2 and Cd9. Mice with disruption of Trem2 had more severe liver damage following administration of carbon tetrachloride or acetaminophen, compared to mice without gene disruption. The authors of this study found that TREM2 is expressed by Kupfer cells and hepatic stellate cells, indicating that TREM2 might downregulate inflammation. Expression was also increased in liver tissues from patients with cirrhosis. Compared with non-tumor liver tissue, TREM2 expression was increased in tumors from mice and patients with hepatocellular carcinoma (HCC). This study also showed that disruption of Trem2 promoted tumor development and exacerbated liver damage and inflammation. In liver tumors, TREM2 was expressed by tumor-infiltrating macrophages (TAMs). TREM2 might therefore promote the resolution of inflammation during hepatic injury, ultimately preventing parenchymal cell death.

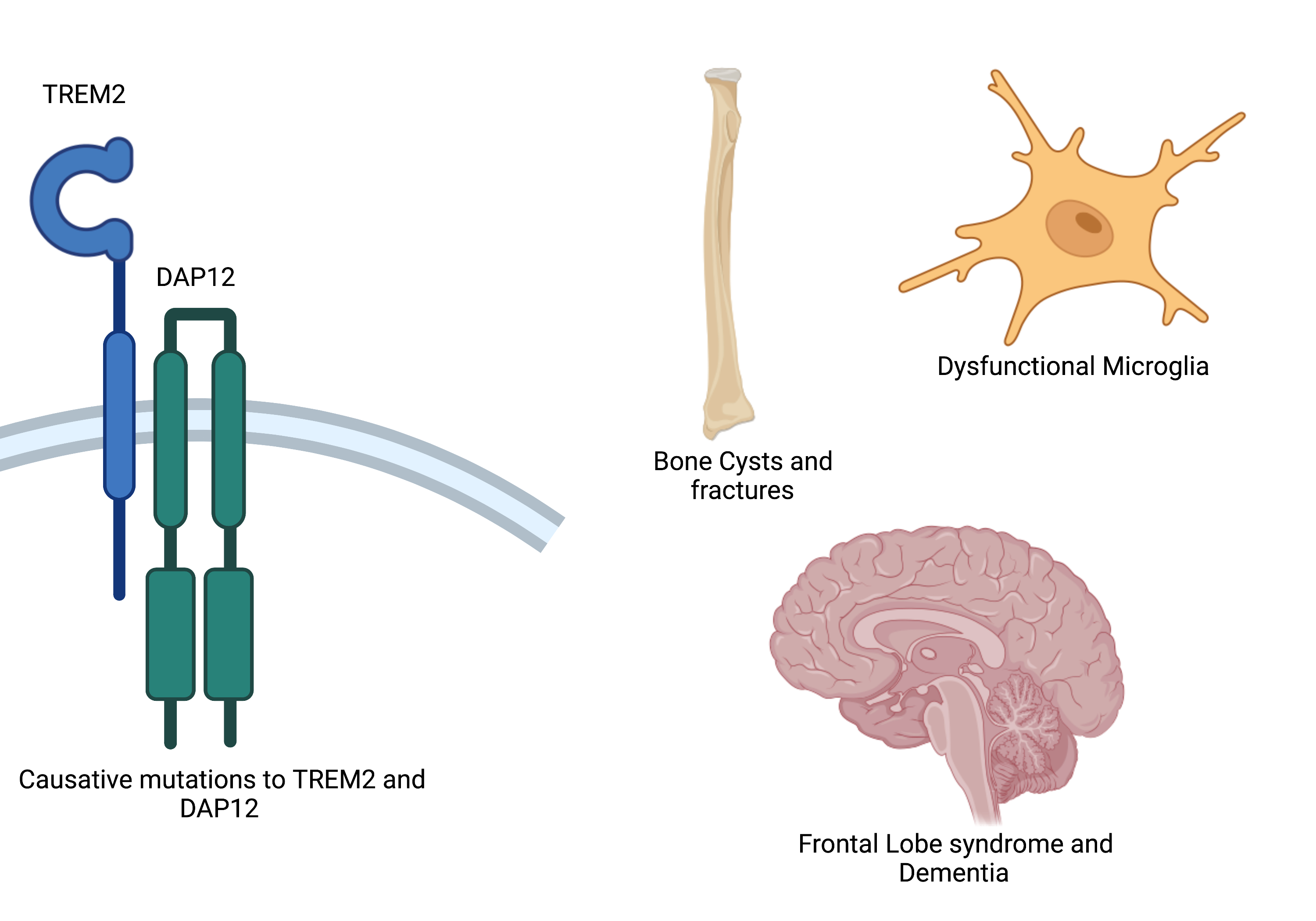
Mutations in the TREM2 or TYROBP genes (encodes DAP12) can lead to development of PLOSL. This disease is characterized by dysfunctional microglia, bone cysts and fractures, frontal lobe syndrome, and dementia. Created with BioRender.com

=== PLOSL or Nasu–Hakola disease ===
PLOSL or Nasu–Hakola disease is a neurodegenerative disorder characterized by bone cysts, dementia, and early death and is associated with variants in the TYROBP gene (encodes DAP12 protein) and TREM2 gene. Bone cysts in patients with PLOSL contain fat in lieu of bone marrow. In this disease, the main cell type in the brain that is affected is the microglia, where TREM2 is expressed. Several recessive, inactivating mutations in TREM2 and TYROBP (encodes DAP12 protein) have been identified that can cause PLOSL. The mutations prevent association between TREM2 and DAP12 or expression of shorter, non-functional forms of TREM2. Loss of function of TREM2 signaling increases the inflammatory responses of microglia, reducing clearance of dead neurons and promoting inflammation and even formation of amyloid plaques.

=== Stroke ===
During ischemic stroke, microglia respond to the area of insult. TREM2 appears to reduce the inflammatory response induced by TLR signaling and promote microglial migration, survival, and regeneration.

=== Other diseases ===
TREM2 has also been linked to additional disorders such as ALS, Parkinson's disease, and more dementia related conditions.

== As a drug target ==
TREM2 is a good therapeutic target for several diseases, including cancer and liver and neurodegenerative diseases. Several companies are developing agents to target TREM2. However, TREM2 is likely to have distinct roles in the pathogenesis of these disorders, so therapeutic agents in development employ different approaches to modify TREM2 activity.

=== Neurodegenerative diseases ===
In the brain, TREM2 is expressed on microglia that regulate clearance of neuronal debris. Binding of apolipoproteins, such as ApoE, to TREM2 promotes phagocytosis of apoptotic neurons or the uptake of amyloid beta by microglia. Variants of TREM2 that encode proteins with reduced affinity for ligands have been associated with Alzheimer's disease.

=== Targeting sTREM2 ===
A potential mechanism of intervention could be targeting the enzymes that cleave the ectodomain, adjusting the rate at which sTREM2 is released. In rodents, a potential therapeutic using this mechanism was used against AD pathology, and the rodents had smaller plaques than controls.
