= TYROBP =

Protein-coding gene in the species Homo sapiens

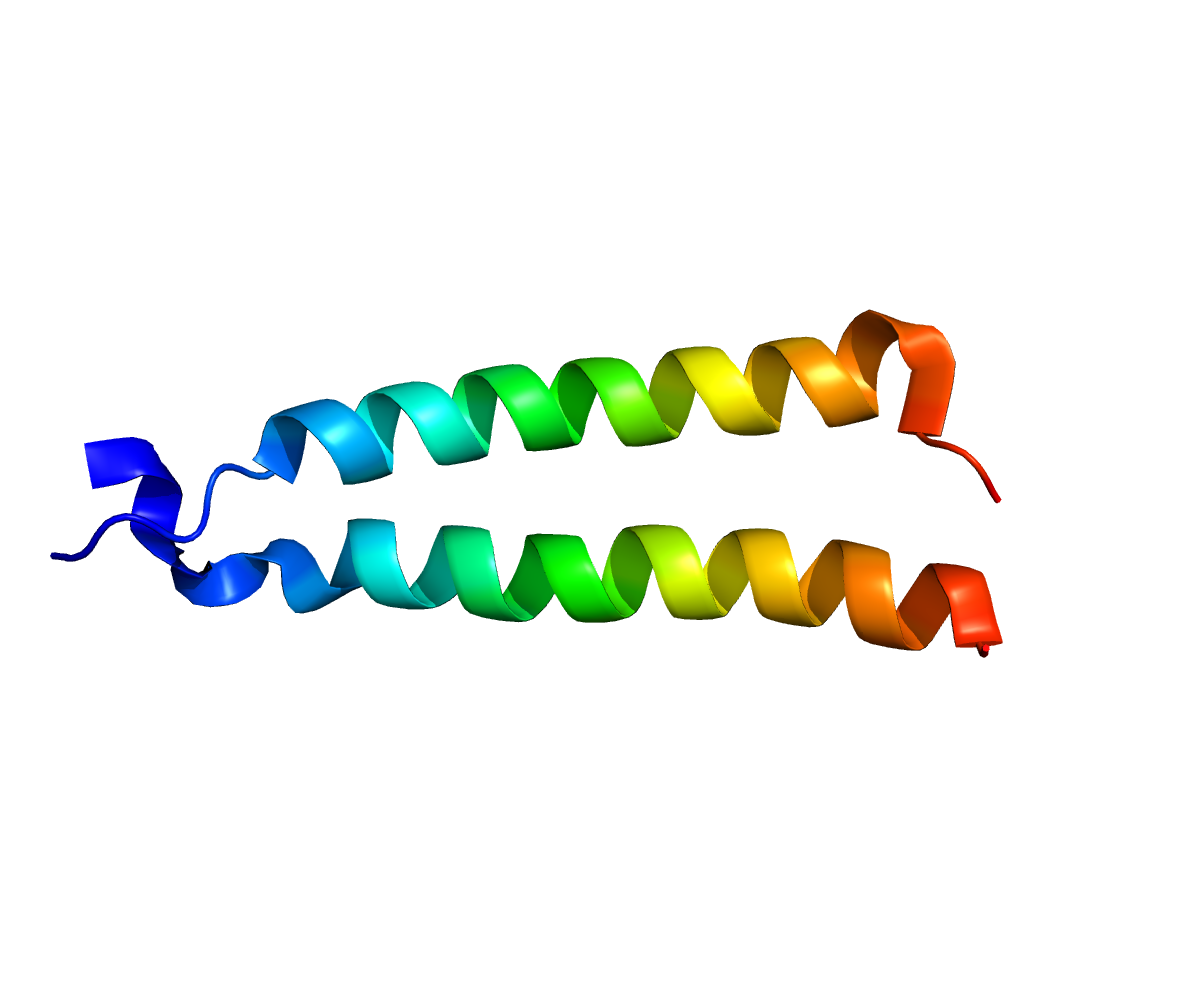
Available structures
PDB	Ortholog search: PDBe RCSB
PDB	List of PDB id codes 2L34, 2L35, 4WO1, 4WOL

Identifiers
- Aliases: TYROBP, DAP12, KARAP, PLOSL, TYRO protein tyrosine kinase binding protein, PLOSL1, transmembrane immune signaling adaptor TYROBP
- External IDs: OMIM: 604142; MGI: 1277211; HomoloGene: 7986; GeneCards: TYROBP; OMA:TYROBP - orthologs

Gene location (Human)
Chr.	Chromosome 19 (human)
Band	19q13.12	Start	35,904,401 bp
Band	19q13.12	End	35,908,295 bp

Gene location (Mouse)
Chr.	Chromosome 7 (mouse)
Band	7 B1|7 17.45 cM	Start	30,113,185 bp
Band	7 B1|7 17.45 cM	End	30,117,010 bp
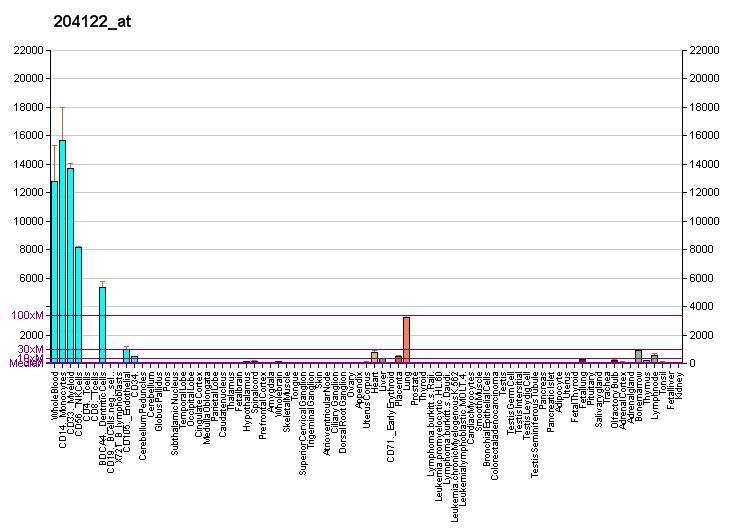
RNA expression pattern
Bgee	Human / Mouse (ortholog); Top expressed in: monocyte; granulocyte; blood; spleen; right lung; bone marrow; periodontal fiber; upper lobe of left lung; bone marrow cells; gallbladder / Top expressed in: granulocyte; tibiofemoral joint; mesenteric lymph nodes; spleen; calvaria; stroma of bone marrow; right lung lobe; blood; internal carotid artery; dermis; More reference expression data
BioGPS	More reference expression data
Gene ontology
Molecular function	signaling receptor binding; protein binding; identical protein binding; metal ion binding
Cellular component	integral component of membrane; cell surface; plasma membrane; integral component of plasma membrane; membrane; secretory granule membrane
Biological process	integrin-mediated signaling pathway; macrophage activation involved in immune response; cellular defense response; neutrophil activation involved in immune response; intracellular signal transduction; innate immune response; regulation of osteoclast development; signal transduction; regulation of immune response; neutrophil degranulation; osteoclast differentiation; myeloid leukocyte activation; positive regulation of natural killer cell activation; positive regulation of macrophage fusion; protein stabilization; positive regulation of microglial cell mediated cytotoxicity; positive regulation of protein localization to cell surface; positive regulation of osteoclast development; microglial cell activation involved in immune response; positive regulation of gene expression; actin cytoskeleton organization; negative regulation of B cell proliferation; forebrain development; negative regulation of transforming growth factor beta1 production; positive regulation of superoxide anion generation; response to axon injury; apoptotic signaling pathway; positive regulation of hippocampal neuron apoptotic process; negative regulation of long-term synaptic potentiation; positive regulation of neuron death; positive regulation of receptor localization to synapse; apoptotic cell clearance; immune system process
Sources:Amigo / QuickGO
Orthologs
Species	Human	Mouse
Entrez	7305	22177
Ensembl	ENSG00000011600	ENSMUSG00000030579
UniProt	O43914	O54885
RefSeq (mRNA)	NM_001173514; NM_001173515; NM_003332; NM_198125	NM_011662
RefSeq (protein)	NP_001166985; NP_001166986; NP_003323; NP_937758	NP_035792
Location (UCSC)	Chr 19: 35.9 – 35.91 Mb	Chr 7: 30.11 – 30.12 Mb
PubMed search
- Wikidata
View/Edit Human	View/Edit Mouse

TYRO protein tyrosine kinase-binding protein is an adapter protein that in humans is encoded by the TYROBP gene.

== Function ==
This gene encodes a transmembrane signaling polypeptide which contains an immunoreceptor tyrosine-based activation motif (ITAM) in its cytoplasmic domain. The encoded protein may associate with the killer cell immunoglobulin-like receptor (KIR) family of membrane glycoproteins and may act as an activating signal transduction element. This protein may bind zeta-chain associated protein kinase 70 kDa (ZAP-70) and spleen tyrosine kinase (SYK) and play a role in signal transduction, bone modeling, brain myelination, and inflammation. Mutations within this gene have been associated with polycystic lipomembranous osteodysplasia with sclerosing leukoencephalopathy (PLOSL), also known as Nasu-Hakola disease. Its putative receptor, triggering receptor expressed on myeloid cells 2 (TREM2), also causes PLOSL. Two alternative transcript variants encoding distinct isoforms have been identified for this gene. Other alternative splice variants have been described, but their full-length nature has not been determined.

== Interactions ==
TYROBP has been shown to interact with SIRPB1.

== Clinical significance ==
Pathological mutations of the TYROBP gene cause polycystic lipomembranous osteodysplasia with sclerosing leukoencephalopathy 1, a condition presenting as early-onset dementia.
