= V-set domain =

Immunoglobulin V-set domain
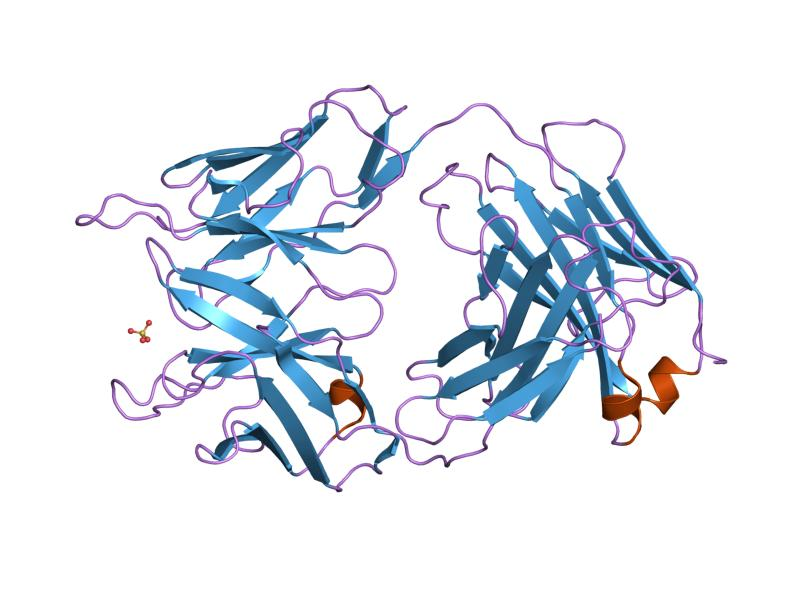
- Structure of phosphocholine binding immunoglobulin Fab McPC603.

Identifiers
- Symbol: V-set
- Pfam: PF07686
- InterPro: IPR013106
Available protein structures:
- PDB: 2mcpH:1-121 1mcpH:1-121 1ohqB:20-116 1houH:20-116 1hezB:20-138 2fb4H:2-125 2ig2H:2-125 1mqkH:20-116 1ub6A:4-96 1ub5A:1-96 1i8kB:26-116 1i8iB:26-116 1igcH:17-135 1l7iH:20-139 2dlfH:1-114 1sm3H:2-114 2fbjH:1-117 7fabH:2-116 1ezvX:20-115 1kcsH:25-115 1kcvH:25-115 1j1pH:2-112 1ic5H:2-112 1j1xH:2-112 1c08B:2-112 1ic4H:2-112 1ic7H:2-112 1j1oH:2-112 1g7mB:20-115 1dvfB:20-115 1g7lB:20-115 1g7hB:20-115 1g7jB:20-115 IPR013106 PF07686 (ECOD; PDBsum)
- AlphaFold: IPR013106; PF07686

V-set domains are Ig-like domains resembling the antibody variable domain. V-set domains are found in diverse protein families, including immunoglobulin light and heavy chains; in several T-cell receptors such as CD2, CD4, CD80, and CD86; in the N-terminal part of Siglec-receptors, in myelin membrane adhesion molecules; in junctional adhesion molecules (JAM); in tyrosine-protein kinase receptors; and in the programmed cell death protein 1 (PD1).

== Subfamilies ==
- Immunoglobulin V-set, subgroup InterPro: IPR003596
- T-cell surface antigen CD2 InterPro: IPR013285

== Human proteins containing this domain ==
ACAM; ACAN; ADAMTSL1; AGC1; AMICA1; BCAM; BCAN; BGP; BGPc; BT3.3; BTN1A1; BTN2A1; BTN2A2; BTN2A3; BTN3A1; BTN3A2; BTN3A3; BTNL2; BTNL3; BTNL8; BTNL9; VSIR; C1orf32; C9orf94; CADM1; CADM2; CADM3; CADM4; CD2; CD226; CD274; CD276; CD300A; CD300C; CD300D; CD300E; CD300LB; CD300LF; CD300LG; CD33; CD3G; CD7; CD79A; CD79B; CD80; CD83; CD86; CD8A; CD8B; CD8B1; CD96; CEACAM1; CEACAM16; CEACAM19; CEACAM21; CEACAM3; CEACAM4; CEACAM5; CEACAM6; CEACAM7; CEACAM8; CHL1; CREA7-4; CRTAM; CSF1R; CTLA4; CXADR; ERMAP; ESAM; F11R; FCAMR; FCRL2; FKSG87; GLUDP5; GPA33; HAPLN1; HAPLN2; HAPLN3; HAPLN4; HAVCR1; HEPACAM; HHLA2; HSPG2; ICOSLG; IGHA1; IGHA2; IGHD; IGHG1; IGHG3; IGHM; IGHV1-69; IGHV4-31; IGHV7-81; IGKC; IGKV1-5; IGKV2-24; IGL@; IGLC1; IGLV2-14; IGLV3-21; IGLV3-25; IGLV4-3; IGLV5-52; IGLV6-57; IGSF11; IGSF2; IGSF3; IGSF6; IGSF8; IGSF9; IL18R1; IREM2; IREM3; JAM2; JAM3; KDR; KIRREL; KIRREL2; KIRREL3; LAG3; LOC253012; LOC402482; MAG; MGC33530; MOG; MPZ; MPZL1; MPZL2; MXRA8; MYBPC3; NCA; NCR2; NCR3; NPHS1; OBSL1; OPCML; P0; PDCD1; PIGR; PILRA; PILRB; PRODH2; PSG1; PSG10; PSG11; PSG11s'; PSG2; PSG3; PSG4; PSG5; PSG6; PSG7; PSG8; PSG9; PTGFRN; PTPN1L; PVR; PVRL1; PVRL2; PVRL3; PVRL4; SCN2B; SCN3B; SCN4B; SEMA3D; SIGLEC1; SIGLEC10; SIGLEC11; SIGLEC12; SIGLEC14; SIGLEC15; SIGLEC6; SIGLEC7; SIGLEC8; SIGLEC9; SIRPA; SIRPB1; SIRPD; SIRPG; SISP1; SLAMF6; SLAMF7; TAPBPL; TCRA; TCRB; TIMD4; TRA@; TRAV20; TRBC1; TRBV19; TRBV3-1; TRBV5-4; TRBV7-2; TRDV2; TREM1; TREM2; TREML1; TREML2; TREML4; TRGV3; TRGV5; TRGV7; TRGV9; VCAM1; VCAN; VPREB1; VPREB3; VSIG1; VSIG2; VSIG4; VSIG9; VSIG10; VSTM1; VSTM2; VTCN1;
