= JAML =

Protein

Identifiers
- Aliases: JAML, AMICA, CREA7-1, CREA7-4, Gm638, AMICA1, junction adhesion molecule like
- External IDs: OMIM: 609770; MGI: 2685484; GeneCards: JAML
Available structures
| PDB | Ortholog search: PDBe RCSB |
| PDB | List of PDB id codes 3MJ6, 3MJ7, 3MJ9 |

Gene location (Human)
| Chr. | Chromosome 11 (human) |
| Band | 11q23.3 | Start | 118,193,725 bp |
| Band | 11q23.3 | End | 118,225,094 bp |

Gene location (Mouse)
| Chr. | Chromosome 9 (mouse) |
| Band | 9|9 A5.2 | Start | 44,990,481 bp |
| Band | 9|9 A5.2 | End | 45,019,832 bp |
RNA expression pattern
| Bgee | Human / Mouse (ortholog); Top expressed in: monocyte; granulocyte; blood; appendix; spleen; right lung; lymph node; gallbladder; bone marrow; rectum / Top expressed in: granulocyte; duodenum; jejunum; ileum; colon; spleen; bone marrow; embryo; stomach; thymus; More reference expression data |
| BioGPS | More reference expression data |
Gene ontology
| Molecular function | integrin binding; protein homodimerization activity; cell adhesion molecule binding |
| Cellular component | integral component of membrane; cell junction; plasma membrane; membrane; bicellular tight junction |
| Biological process | immune system process; gamma-delta T cell activation; heterophilic cell-cell adhesion via plasma membrane cell adhesion molecules; monocyte extravasation; neutrophil extravasation; cell adhesion; positive regulation of epithelial cell proliferation involved in wound healing; leukocyte migration; neutrophil chemotaxis; regulation of immune response |
Sources:Amigo / QuickGO
Orthologs
| Databases | NCBI: entry; OMA: entry |
| Species | Human | Mouse |
| Entrez | 120425 | 270152 |
| Ensembl | ENSG00000160593 | ENSMUSG00000048534 |
| UniProt | Q86YT9 | Q80UL9 |
| RefSeq (mRNA) | NM_001098526; NM_001286570; NM_001286571; NM_153206 | NM_001005421 |
| RefSeq (protein) | NP_001091996; NP_001273499; NP_001273500; NP_694938 | NP_001005421 |
| Location (UCSC) | Chr 11: 118.19 – 118.23 Mb | Chr 9: 44.99 – 45.02 Mb |
| PubMed search |
- Wikidata
| View/Edit Human | View/Edit Mouse |

JAML or Junctional Adhesion Molecule-Like, or AMICA1 is a JAM transmembrane protein family member. Other members of the JAM family of transmembrane proteins include JAM1, JAM2 and JAM3.

== Tissue distribution ==
It has been shown to localize to the tight junctions of epithelial cells.

== Structure ==
It is composed of two extracellular immunoglobulin-like domains, a membrane-spanning region, and a cytoplasmic tail involved in activation signaling.

== Function ==
It is a known ligand of JAML is Coxsackie virus and Adenovirus Receptor (CXADR in humans and CAR in mice).

JAML-mediated activation of CAR is required for neutrophil extravasation in addition to other leukocyte/epithelial cell interaction models.
