= Butyrophilin =

Protein family

Identifiers
- Symbol: Butyrophilin
- Membranome: 14

Butyrophilin, subfamily 1, member A1

Identifiers
- Symbol: BTN1A1
- NCBI gene: 696
- HGNC: 1135
- RefSeq: NP_001723
- UniProt: Q13410

Other data
- Locus: Chr. 6 p22.2
Search for
- Structures: Swiss-model
- Domains: InterPro

Butyrophilin, subfamily 2, member A2

Identifiers
- Symbol: BTN2A2
- NCBI gene: 10385
- HGNC: 1137
- RefSeq: NP_008926
- UniProt: Q8WVV5

Other data
- Locus: Chr. 6 p22.2
Search for
- Structures: Swiss-model
- Domains: InterPro

Butyrophilin, subfamily 3, member A1

Identifiers
- Symbol: BTN3A1
- NCBI gene: 11119
- HGNC: 1138
- RefSeq: NP_008979
- UniProt: O00481

Other data
- Locus: Chr. 6 p22.2
Search for
- Structures: Swiss-model
- Domains: InterPro

Butyrophilins are membrane proteins belonging to the immunoglobulin superfamily (Ig). Butyrophilin (Btn) genes constitute a subgroup of at least 10 genes in the Ig superfamily identified in human, mouse, cow, goat and other species.

The eponymous Btn gene (BTN1A1 in humans; Btn1a1 in mouse) is highly expressed in the secretory epithelium of the mammary gland during lactation. Other homologues are predominantly expressed in skeletal muscle and the intestine and erythroid cells. In contrast, BTN2A1 and 2 and BTN3A1, 2, and 3 are widely expressed in many tissues, suggesting that the structural domains of Btn proteins may have both universal and tissue-specific functions.

Types include:

- BTN1A1 - Regulates secretion of milk-lipid droplets
- BTN2A2 - Involved in lipid, fatty-acid, and sterol metabolism
- BTN3A1 - Presents phosphoantigens to Gamma delta T cells
