= Nangibotide =

Chemical compound

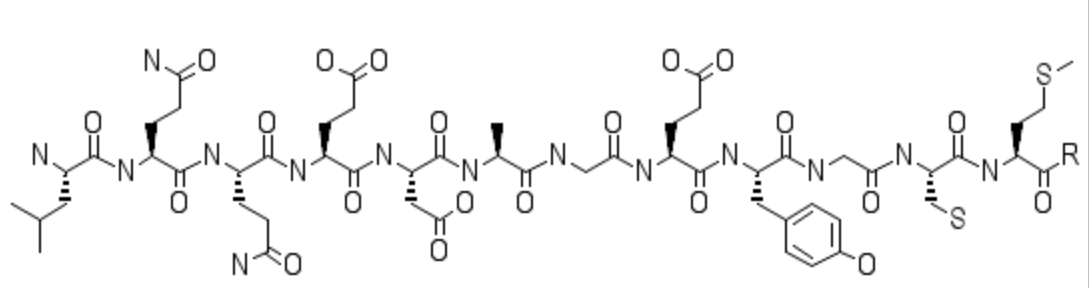

Clinical data
- Routes of administration: Intravenous; intraperitoneal

Physiological data
- Receptors: TREM-1
- Metabolism: Enzymatic in bloodstream

Pharmacokinetic data
- Metabolism: Enzymatic in bloodstream
- Elimination half-life: 3 minutes

Identifiers
- IUPAC name: L-Leucyl-L-glutaminyl-L-glutaminyl-L-α-glutamyl-L-α-aspartyl-L-alanylglycyl-L-α-glutamyl-L-tyrosylglycyl-L-cysteinyl-L-methionine
- CAS Number: 2014384‐91‐7
- ChemSpider: 64835227
- UNII: 59HD7BLX9H
- ChEMBL: ChEMBL4297793

Chemical and physical data
- Formula: C54H82N14O22S2
- Molar mass: 1343.439
- 3D model (JSmol): Interactive image
- SMILES: C[C@@H](C(=O)NCC(=O)N[C@@H](CCC(=O)O)C(=O)N[C@@H](Cc1ccc(cc1)O)C(=O)NCC(=O)N[C@@H](CS)C(=O)N[C@@H](CCSC)C(=O)N)NC(=O)[C@H](CC(=O)O)NC(=O)[C@H](CCC(=O)O)NC(=O)[C@H](CCC(=O)N)NC(=O)[C@H](CCC(=O)N)NC(=O)[C@H](CC(C)C)N
- InChI: InChI=1S/C54H83N15O21S2/c1-25(2)19-29(55)47(83)65-32(9-13-38(56)71)50(86)66-33(10-14-39(57)72)51(87)67-34(12-16-43(77)78)52(88)69-36(21-44(79)80)53(89)61-26(3)46(82)59-22-40(73)62-31(11-15-42(75)76)49(85)68-35(20-27-5-7-28(70)8-6-27)48(84)60-23-41(74)63-37(24-91)54(90)64-30(45(58)81)17-18-92-4/h5-8,25-26,29-37,70,91H,9-24,55H2,1-4H3,(H2,56,71)(H2,57,72)(H2,58,81)(H,59,82)(H,60,84)(H,61,89)(H,62,73)(H,63,74)(H,64,90)(H,65,83)(H,66,86)(H,67,87)(H,68,85)(H,69,88)(H,75,76)(H,77,78)(H,79,80)/t26-,29-,30-,31-,32-,33-,34-,35-,36-,37-/m0/s1; Key:JLOOQDWHNKOITN-DAHMAOPXSA-N

Nangibotide is an inhibitor of TREM-1, a receptor found on certain white blood cells. Activation of TREM-1 stimulates inflammation. Nangibotide is therefore being investigated as a treatment for the overwhelming inflammation typically seen in severe sepsis.

== Chemistry ==
Nangibotide is a 12-amino-acid polypeptide derived from TLT-1.

== Mode of action ==
TREM-1 is a receptor found on neutrophils, macrophages and monocytes, key elements of the immune system. Activation of TREM-1 results in expression of NF-κB, which promotes systemic inflammation. Nangibotide inhibits TREM-1, thereby preventing the inflammatory activation. Absence of TREM-1 results in vastly reduced inflammation without impairing the ability to fight infection.

== Animal models ==
LR17, a mouse equivalent of nangibotide, improves survival in mouse models of severe sepsis. In a pig model of sepsis, LR12 - another animal equivalent of nangibotide - resulted in significantly improved haemodynamics and less organ failure. In monkeys, LR12 also reduced the inflammatory and hypotensive effects of sepsis.

== Human studies ==
Nangibotide has demonstrated safety in Phase 1 (healthy volunteers) and Phase 2 (sick patients with septic shock) studies. The ASTONISH trial will examine clinical efficacy in 450 patients with septic shock.
