= Scianna =

Scianna is a surname. Notable people with the surname include:

- Ferdinando Scianna (born 1943), Italian photographer
- Francesco Scianna (born 1982), Italian actor

== See also ==
- Scianna antigen system, blood antigen system
