= IGSF11 =

Human protein-coding gene

Identifiers
- Aliases: IGSF11, BT-IgSF, CT119, CXADRL1, Igsf13, VSIG3, immunoglobulin superfamily member 11, BTIGSF
- External IDs: OMIM: 608351; MGI: 2388477; GeneCards: IGSF11

Gene location (Human)
| Chr. | Chromosome 3 (human) |
| Band | 3q13.32 | Start | 118,900,557 bp |
| Band | 3q13.32 | End | 119,146,068 bp |

Gene location (Mouse)
| Chr. | Chromosome 16 (mouse) |
| Band | 16|16 B4 | Start | 38,713,033 bp |
| Band | 16|16 B4 | End | 38,847,521 bp |
RNA expression pattern
| Bgee | Human / Mouse (ortholog); Top expressed in: secondary oocyte; corpus callosum; left testis; right testis; spinal cord; C1 segment; internal globus pallidus; inferior ganglion of vagus nerve; caudate nucleus; ventricular zone / Top expressed in: gastrula; zygote; right kidney; human kidney; secondary oocyte; neural layer of retina; spermatid; proximal tubule; superior frontal gyrus; ventricular zone; More reference expression data |
| BioGPS | n/a |
Gene ontology
| Molecular function | ionotropic glutamate receptor binding; protein binding |
| Cellular component | integral component of membrane; plasma membrane; membrane; cell-cell junction; postsynaptic density; excitatory synapse |
| Biological process | regulation of growth; cell adhesion; homophilic cell adhesion via plasma membrane adhesion molecules; maintenance of protein location; regulation of synaptic plasticity; positive regulation of mini excitatory postsynaptic potential; positive regulation of long-term synaptic potentiation |
Sources:Amigo / QuickGO
Orthologs
| Databases | NCBI: entry; OMA: entry |
| Species | Human | Mouse |
| Entrez | 152404 | 207683 |
| Ensembl | ENSG00000144847 | ENSMUSG00000022790 |
| UniProt | Q5DX21 | P0C673 |
| RefSeq (mRNA) | NM_001015887; NM_152538; NM_001353318; NM_001353319; NM_001353320 NM_001353321; NM_001353322; NM_001353323; NM_001353324; NM_001353325; NM_001353326 | NM_170599 |
| RefSeq (protein) | NP_001015887; NP_689751; NP_001340247; NP_001340248; NP_001340249 NP_001340250; NP_001340251; NP_001340252; NP_001340253; NP_001340254; NP_001340255 | NP_733548 |
| Location (UCSC) | Chr 3: 118.9 – 119.15 Mb | Chr 16: 38.71 – 38.85 Mb |
| PubMed search |
- Wikidata
| View/Edit Human | View/Edit Mouse |

Immunoglobulin superfamily member 11 (IGSF11), also known as VSIG3 or BT-IgSF, is a protein that in humans is encoded by the IGSF11 gene.

== Structure ==
IGSF11 is a single-pass transmembrane protein with two extracellular immunoglobulin-like domains, one of the V-set type and one of the C2-set type. It can mediate adhesion between cells that express the protein.

== Function ==
IGSF11 binds the immune checkpoint protein VISTA. In experimental systems, this interaction can suppress T cell responses. Blocking the interaction is being investigated as a strategy for cancer immunotherapy.

== Animal studies ==
In rodent studies, IgSF11 associated with the postsynaptic scaffold protein PSD-95 and with AMPA receptors. Reducing IgSF11 in cultured rat hippocampal neurons weakened AMPA receptor-mediated synaptic transmission. In mouse models, loss of IgSF11 also impaired osteoclast differentiation and reduced bone resorption.
