= MNV =

MNV or mnv may refer to:

- Murine norovirus, a species of norovirus affecting mice
- MNV, the FAA LID code for Monroe County Airport, Madisonville, Tennessee
- MNV, the Indian Railways station code for Mungaoli railway station, Madhya Pradesh, India
- mnv, the ISO 639-3 code for Rennellese language, Solomon Islands
