= TCRB =

TCRB may refer to:

== Biology ==
- T-cell receptor beta locus (TCRB, TCRb, TCR𝛽, Tcrb, Tcr𝛽), a location on the T-cell receptor
- TRCB gene and protein, also known as the T cell receptor beta constant 1 (TCRB1, TRCBC1)
- T-cell-rich B-cell lymphoma (TCRB, TCRB-NHL), a type of large-cell lymphoma

== Other uses ==
- T Coronae Borealis (T CrB), a recurrent nova variable star system
- TCR Benelux Series (TCR-B, TCR-BNL), a racing car championship
