= VSIG1 =

Protein-coding gene in the species Homo sapiens

Identifiers
- Aliases: VSIG1, 1700062D20Rik, GPA34, dJ889N15.1, V-set and immunoglobulin domain containing 1
- External IDs: OMIM: 300620; MGI: 1926039; GeneCards: VSIG1

Gene location (Human)
Chr.	X chromosome (human)
Band	Xq22.3	Start	108,044,970 bp
Band	Xq22.3	End	108,079,184 bp

Gene location (Mouse)
Chr.	X chromosome (mouse)
Band	X|X F1	Start	139,808,357 bp
Band	X|X F1	End	139,840,221 bp
RNA expression pattern
Bgee	Human / Mouse (ortholog); Top expressed in: pylorus; right testis; left testis; pancreatic epithelial cell; body of stomach; cardia; pancreatic ductal cell; gallbladder; gastric mucosa; fundus / Top expressed in: testicle; stomach; spermatid; spermatocyte; duodenum; islet of Langerhans; colon; right kidney; quadriceps femoris muscle; More reference expression data
BioGPS	n/a
Orthologs
Databases	NCBI: entry; OMA: entry
Species	Human	Mouse
Entrez	340547	78789
Ensembl	ENSG00000101842	ENSMUSG00000031430
UniProt	Q86XK7	Q9D2J4
RefSeq (mRNA)	NM_001170553; NM_182607	NM_026103; NM_030181; NM_001359143
RefSeq (protein)	NP_001164024; NP_872413	NP_080379; NP_084457; NP_001346072
Location (UCSC)	Chr X: 108.04 – 108.08 Mb	Chr X: 139.81 – 139.84 Mb
PubMed search
- Wikidata
View/Edit Human	View/Edit Mouse

V-set and immunoglobulin domain containing 1 is a protein that in humans is encoded by the VSIG1 gene.

== Function ==
This gene encodes a member of the junctional adhesion molecule (JAM) family. The encoded protein contains multiple glycosylation sites at the N-terminal region, and multiple phosphorylation sites and glutamic acid/proline (EP) repeats at the C-terminal region. The gene is expressed in a normal stomach and testis, as well as in gastric, esophageal, and ovarian cancers. Alternatively spliced transcript variants, encoding different isoforms, have been found for this gene. [provided by RefSeq, Dec 2009].
