= Sialoadhesin =

Protein-coding gene in the species Homo sapiens

SIGLEC1
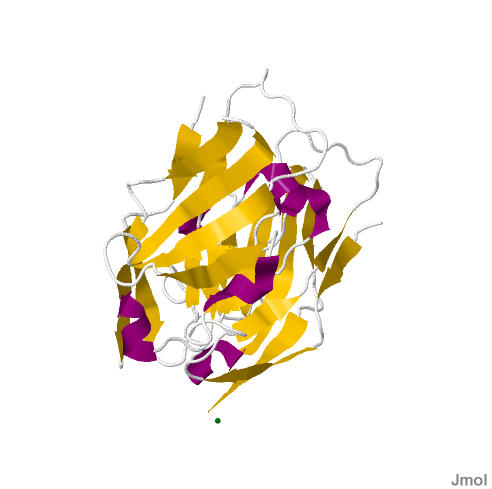

Identifiers
- Aliases: SIGLEC1, CD169, SIGLEC-1, SN, dJ1009E24.1, sialic acid binding Ig like lectin 1
- External IDs: OMIM: 600751; MGI: 99668; GeneCards: SIGLEC1

Gene location (Human)
Chr.	Chromosome 20 (human)
Band	20p13	Start	3,686,970 bp
Band	20p13	End	3,712,600 bp

Gene location (Mouse)
Chr.	Chromosome 2 (mouse)
Band	2 F1|2 63.26 cM	Start	130,911,140 bp
Band	2 F1|2 63.26 cM	End	130,928,685 bp
RNA expression pattern
Bgee	Human / Mouse (ortholog); Top expressed in: right adrenal cortex; right coronary artery; decidua; gastric mucosa; granulocyte; subcutaneous adipose tissue; synovial membrane; lymph node; left adrenal gland; apex of heart / Top expressed in: stroma of bone marrow; muscle of thigh; granulocyte; lymph node; aortic valve; knee joint; mesenteric lymph nodes; liver; spleen; lip; More reference expression data
BioGPS	n/a
Gene ontology
Molecular function	carbohydrate binding
Cellular component	integral component of membrane; extracellular region; plasma membrane; membrane
Biological process	cell-matrix adhesion; inflammatory response; cell adhesion; endocytosis; cell-cell adhesion
Sources:Amigo / QuickGO
Orthologs
Databases	NCBI: entry; OMA: entry
Species	Human	Mouse
Entrez	6614	20612
Ensembl	ENSG00000088827	ENSMUSG00000027322
UniProt	Q9BZZ2	Q62230
RefSeq (mRNA)	NM_023068; NM_001367089	NM_011426
RefSeq (protein)	NP_075556; NP_001354018	NP_035556
Location (UCSC)	Chr 20: 3.69 – 3.71 Mb	Chr 2: 130.91 – 130.93 Mb
PubMed search
- Wikidata
View/Edit Human	View/Edit Mouse

Sialoadhesin
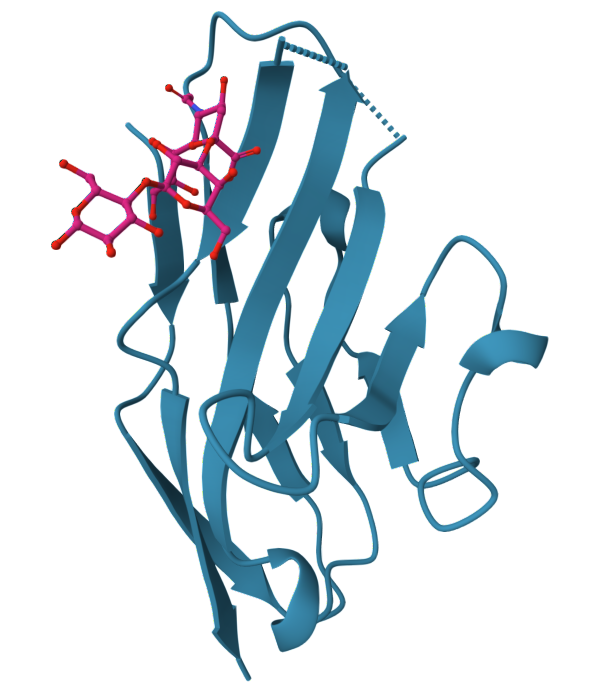
- Structure of the N-terminal domain of sialoadhesin.

Identifiers
- Symbol: SIGLEC1
- Alt. symbols: SN, CD169
- NCBI gene: 6614
- HGNC: 11127
- OMIM: 600751
- PDB: 2BVE
- RefSeq: NM_023068
- UniProt: Q9BZZ2

Other data
- Locus: Chr. 20 p13
Search for
- Structures: Swiss-model
- Domains: InterPro

Sialoadhesin (SIGLEC-1) is a cell adhesion molecule found on the surface of various immune cells. It is found in especially high amounts on macrophages of the spleen, liver, lymph node, bone marrow, colon, and lungs.

Soluble SIGLEC-1 is a biomarker of monocyte-macrophage activation in systemic lupus erythematosus (SLE) and other autoimmune disorders. In patients with rheumatoid arthritis, the protein has been found in great amounts on macrophages of the affected tissues. It is defined as an I-type lectin, since it contains 17 immunoglobulin (Ig) domains (one variable domain and 16 constant domains), and thus also belongs to the immunoglobulin superfamily (IgSF).

Sialoadhesin binds to certain molecules called sialic acids. During this binding process a salt bridge is formed between a highly conserved arginine residue (in the V-set domain) and the carboxylate group of the sialic acid. Since sialoadhesin binds sialic acids with its N-terminal IgV-domain, it is also a member of the Siglec family. Alternate names for sialoadhesin include siglec-1 and CD169 (cluster of differentiation 169).

Sialoadhesin predominantly binds neutrophils, but can also bind monocytes, natural killer cells, B cells and a subset of cytotoxic T cells by interacting with sialic acid molecules in the ligands on their surfaces.

== Expression ==
Sialoadhesin (CD169) positive macrophages, along with mesenchymal stem cells and beta-adrenergic neurons, form the hematopoietic stem cell niche in the bone marrow. CD169^{+} macrophages mediate signaling between the various cells and seem to promote hematopoietic stem cell retention to the niche.

Siglec-1 is also expressed on lymph node subcapsular sinus macrophages. Research using a murine melanoma model has demonstrated that these subcapsular sinus macrophages bind to sialylated proteins present on the surface of pioneer metastatic cells shortly after their landing in the lymph nodes. This interaction serves as a critical step in metastatic colonization, providing a conducive environment, or 'soil,' for the establishment and proliferation of pioneer metastatic cells, often referred to as 'seeds.'
