= CD300A =

Human gene

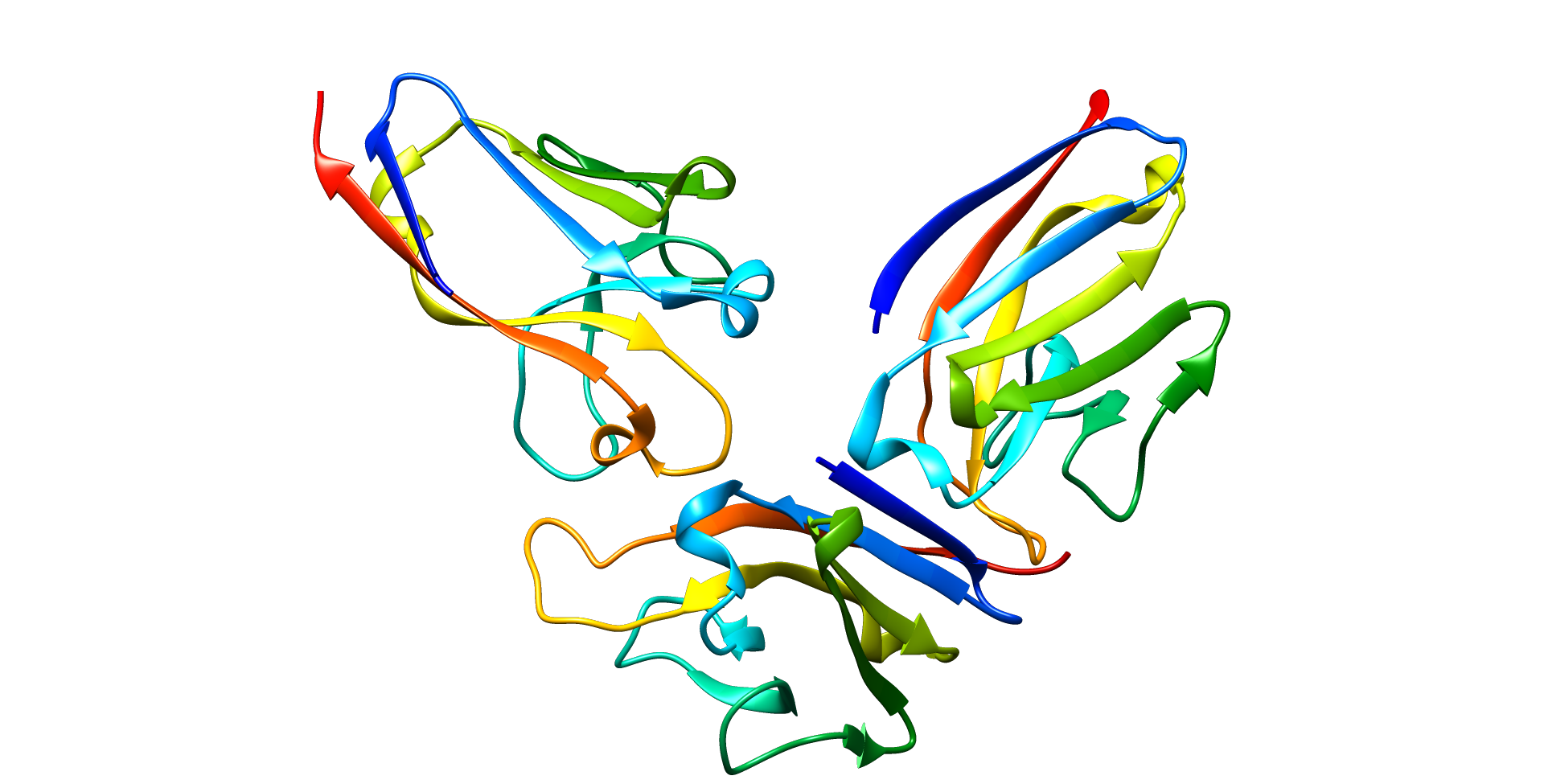

Identifiers
- Aliases: CD300A, CLM-8, CMRF-35-H9, CMRF-35H, CMRF35-H, CMRF35-H9, CMRF35H, CMRF35H9, IGSF12, IRC1, IRC1/IRC2, IRC2, IRp60, CD300a molecule
- External IDs: OMIM: 606790; MGI: 2443411; GeneCards: CD300A
Available structures
PDB	Ortholog search: PDBe RCSB
PDB	List of PDB id codes 2Q87

Gene location (Human)
Chr.	Chromosome 17 (human)
Band	17q25.1	Start	74,466,399 bp
Band	17q25.1	End	74,484,794 bp
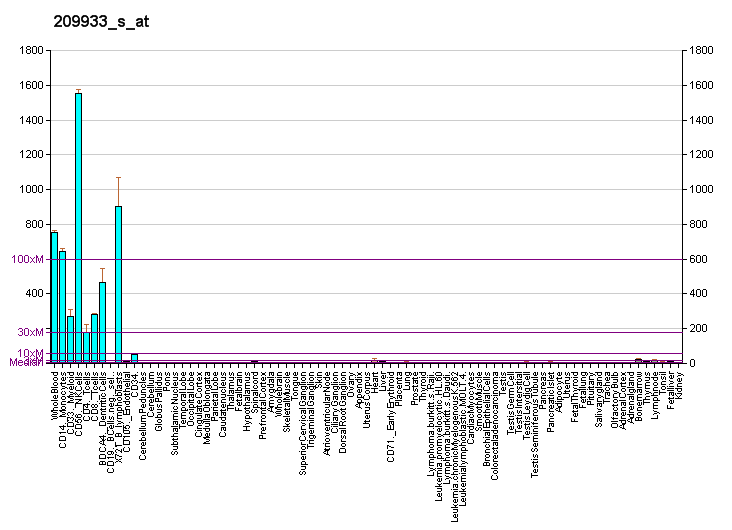

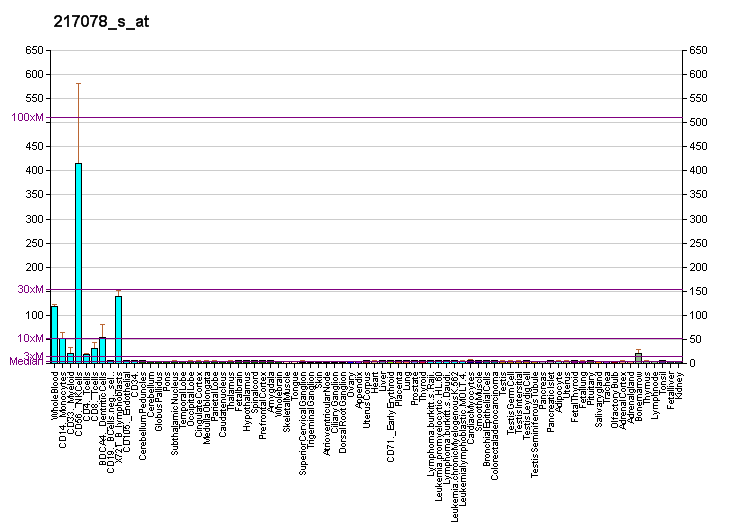
RNA expression pattern
Bgee	Human / Mouse (ortholog); Top expressed in: granulocyte; blood; monocyte; spleen; bone marrow; bone marrow cell; amniotic fluid; appendix; periodontal fiber; lymph node / n/a; More reference expression data
BioGPS	More reference expression data
Gene ontology
Molecular function	signaling receptor activity; phosphatidylethanolamine binding; phosphatidylserine binding; protein binding
Cellular component	integral component of membrane; extracellular exosome; membrane; plasma membrane; tertiary granule membrane; ficolin-1-rich granule membrane
Biological process	regulation of T cell receptor signaling pathway; immune system process; negative regulation of eosinophil migration; positive regulation of phosphoprotein phosphatase activity; negative regulation of neutrophil activation; negative regulation of eosinophil activation; regulation of immune response; negative regulation of fibroblast proliferation; negative regulation of MAP kinase activity; negative regulation of mast cell degranulation; negative regulation of mast cell activation involved in immune response; cell adhesion; negative regulation of NK T cell activation; negative regulation of B cell receptor signaling pathway; negative regulation of activation of Janus kinase activity; negative regulation of phagocytosis, engulfment; negative regulation of B cell proliferation; signal transduction; negative regulation of MyD88-dependent toll-like receptor signaling pathway; neutrophil degranulation
Sources:Amigo / QuickGO
Orthologs
Databases	NCBI: entry; OMA: entry
Species	Human	Mouse
Entrez	11314	217303
Ensembl	ENSG00000167851	n/a
UniProt	Q9UGN4	Q6SJQ0
RefSeq (mRNA)	NM_001256841; NM_007261; NM_001330456; NM_001330457	NM_170758; NM_001347654; NM_001359812
RefSeq (protein)	NP_001243770; NP_001317385; NP_001317386; NP_009192	NP_001334583; NP_739564; NP_001346741
Location (UCSC)	Chr 17: 74.47 – 74.48 Mb	n/a
PubMed search
- Wikidata
View/Edit Human	View/Edit Mouse

CMRF35-like molecule 8 is a protein encode by CD300A (Cluster of Differentiation 300A) gene.

The CD300C, which was identified by reactivity with a monoclonal antibody, is present on monocytes, neutrophils, and some T and B lymphocytes. CD300A is recognized by the same antibody and is distinct from CD300C (Green et al., 1998).[supplied by OMIM]

== See also ==
- Cluster of differentiation
