= GLUDP5 =

Pseudogene found in humans

GLUD1P5

Identifiers
- Aliases: GLUD1P5, GLUDP5, glutamate dehydrogenase 1 pseudogene 5
- External IDs: GeneCards: GLUD1P5; OMA:GLUD1P5 - orthologs
Orthologs
Species	Human	Mouse
Entrez	2751	n/a
Ensembl	n/a	n/a
UniProt	n a	n/a
RefSeq (mRNA)	n/a	n/a
RefSeq (protein)	n/a	n/a
Location (UCSC)	n/a	n/a
PubMed search		n/a
- Wikidata
View/Edit Human

Glutamate dehydrogenase pseudogene 5, also known as GLUDP5, is a human gene.
