= Scianna antigen system =

The Scianna blood group system consists of seven antigens. These include two high frequency antigens Sc1 and Sc3, and two low frequency antigens Sc2 and Sc4.

The very rare null phenotype is characterised by the absence of Sc1, Sc2 and Sc3.

== Molecular basis and clinical diagnostic ==
Scianna blood group antigens are carried on the ERMAP protein, a single-pass transmembrane glycoprotein encoded by the ERMAP gene (erythroblast membrane-associated protein). Clinical testing in patient care for ERMAP follows published minimum quality and operational requirements, similar to red cell genotyping for any of the other recognized blood group systems. Molecular analysis can identify gene variants (alleles) that may affect ERMAP protein expression on the red cell membrane.

== History ==
This blood group system was discovered in 1962 when a high frequency antigen was detected in a young woman (Ms. Scianna) who had experienced several late pregnancy losses due to haemolytic disease of the fetus. In 2003, ERMAP was established as the gene underlying the Scianna blood group system. Scianna was the last of the previously characterized protein-based blood group systems whose molecular basis was elucidated.
