= Butyrophilin, subfamily 2, member A2 =

Protein-coding gene in the species Homo sapiens

BTN2A2

Identifiers
- Aliases: BTN2A2, BT2.2, BTF2, BTN2.2, Butyrophilin, subfamily 2, member A2, butyrophilin subfamily 2 member A2
- External IDs: OMIM: 613591; MGI: 3606486; GeneCards: BTN2A2

Gene location (Human)
Chr.	Chromosome 6 (human)
Band	6p22.2	Start	26,383,096 bp
Band	6p22.2	End	26,394,874 bp

Gene location (Mouse)
Chr.	Chromosome 13 (mouse)
Band	13|13 A3.1	Start	23,661,846 bp
Band	13|13 A3.1	End	23,673,027 bp
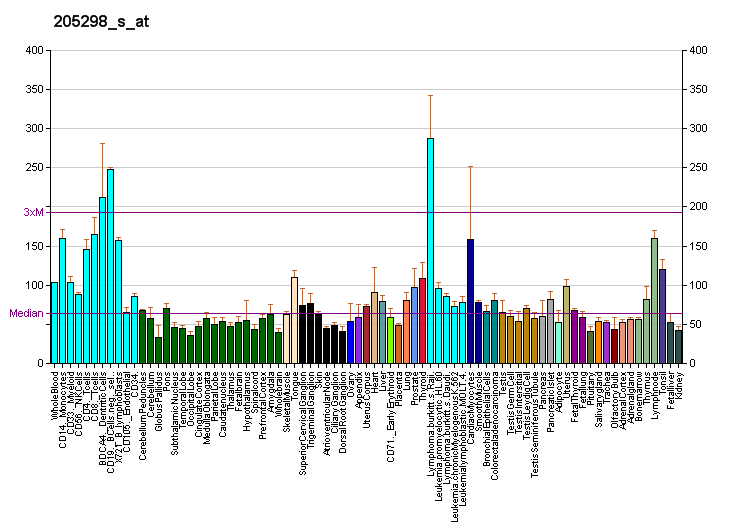

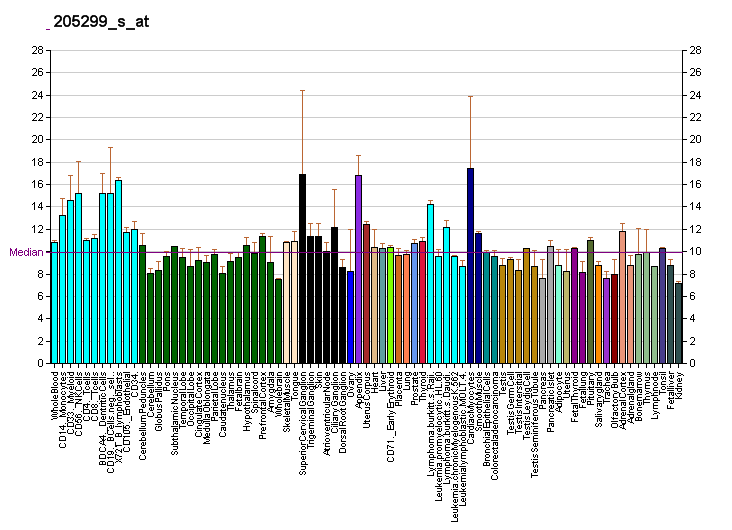
RNA expression pattern
Bgee	Human / Mouse (ortholog); Top expressed in: epithelium of nasopharynx; lymph node; tonsil; granulocyte; appendix; monocyte; tendon of biceps brachii; spleen; pancreatic ductal cell; cerebellar cortex / Top expressed in: embryo; embryo; secondary oocyte; morula; primary oocyte; epiblast; blastocyst; primary visual cortex; placenta; hippocampus proper; More reference expression data
BioGPS	More reference expression data
Gene ontology
Molecular function	protein binding; signaling receptor binding
Cellular component	integral component of membrane; membrane; plasma membrane; external side of plasma membrane; cell surface
Biological process	negative regulation of activated T cell proliferation; negative regulation of cellular metabolic process; negative regulation of phosphatidylinositol 3-kinase signaling; positive regulation of regulatory T cell differentiation; regulation of immune response; T cell receptor signaling pathway; negative regulation of T cell receptor signaling pathway; negative regulation of protein kinase B signaling; negative regulation of ERK1 and ERK2 cascade; negative regulation of G1/S transition of mitotic cell cycle
Sources:Amigo / QuickGO
Orthologs
Databases	NCBI: entry; OMA: entry
Species	Human	Mouse
Entrez	10385	238555
Ensembl	ENSG00000124508	ENSMUSG00000053216
UniProt	Q8WVV5	A4QPC6
RefSeq (mRNA)	NM_001197237; NM_001197238; NM_001197239; NM_001197240; NM_006995 NM_181531	NM_001289614; NM_001289615; NM_175938
RefSeq (protein)	NP_001184166; NP_001184167; NP_001184168; NP_001184169; NP_008926 NP_853509; NP_001184166.1; NP_008926.2	NP_001276543; NP_001276544; NP_787952
Location (UCSC)	Chr 6: 26.38 – 26.39 Mb	Chr 13: 23.66 – 23.67 Mb
PubMed search
- Wikidata
View/Edit Human	View/Edit Mouse

Butyrophilin subfamily 2 member A2 is a protein that in humans is encoded by the BTN2A2 gene.

== Function ==
Butyrophilin is the major protein associated with fat droplets in the milk. This gene is a member of the BTN2 subfamily of genes, which encode proteins belonging to the butyrophilin protein family. The gene is located in a cluster on chromosome 6, consisting of seven genes belonging to the expanding B7/butyrophilin-like group, a subset of the immunoglobulin gene superfamily. The encoded protein is a type 1 receptor glycoprotein involved in lipid, fatty-acid and sterol metabolism. Several alternatively spliced transcript variants of this gene have been described, but the full-length nature of some variants has not been determined.
