= Butyrophilin, subfamily 1, member A1 =

Protein-coding gene in the species Homo sapiens

BTN1A1

Identifiers
- Aliases: BTN1A1, BT, BTN, BTN1, butyrophilin subfamily 1 member A1
- External IDs: OMIM: 601610; MGI: 103118; GeneCards: BTN1A1

Gene location (Human)
Chr.	Chromosome 6 (human)
Band	6p22.2	Start	26,500,303 bp
Band	6p22.2	End	26,510,425 bp

Gene location (Mouse)
Chr.	Chromosome 13 (mouse)
Band	13 A3.1|13 9.72 cM	Start	23,641,162 bp
Band	13 A3.1|13 9.72 cM	End	23,650,071 bp
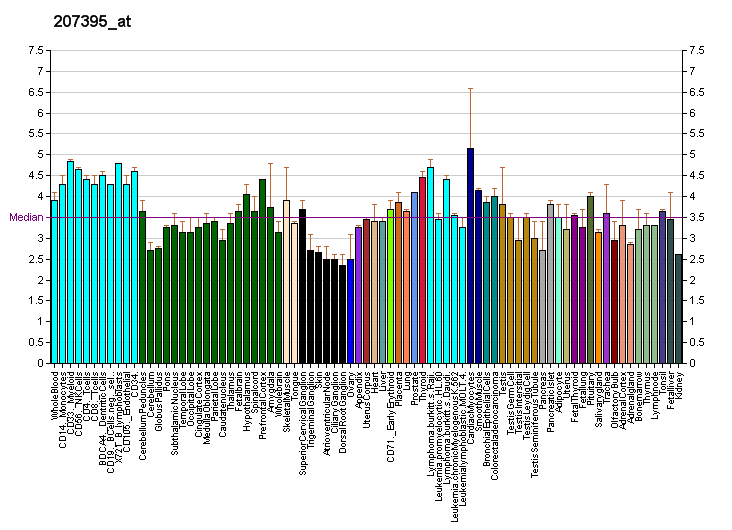
RNA expression pattern
Bgee	Human / Mouse (ortholog); Top expressed in: gonad; lymph node; appendix; tonsil; spleen; blood; granulocyte; urinary bladder; C1 segment; duodenum / Top expressed in: lactiferous gland; ascending aorta; female urethra; aortic valve; embryo; atrioventricular junction; endocardial cushion; Paneth cell; gastrula; atrioventricular valve; More reference expression data
BioGPS	More reference expression data
Gene ontology
Molecular function	signaling receptor binding; signaling receptor activity
Cellular component	integral component of membrane; extracellular region; integral component of plasma membrane; membrane; extracellular space; plasma membrane; external side of plasma membrane
Biological process	regulation of immune response; T cell receptor signaling pathway
Sources:Amigo / QuickGO
Orthologs
Databases	NCBI: entry; OMA: entry
Species	Human	Mouse
Entrez	696	12231
Ensembl	ENSG00000124557	ENSMUSG00000000706
UniProt	Q13410	Q62556
RefSeq (mRNA)	NM_001732	NM_013483
RefSeq (protein)	NP_001723	NP_038511
Location (UCSC)	Chr 6: 26.5 – 26.51 Mb	Chr 13: 23.64 – 23.65 Mb
PubMed search
- Wikidata
View/Edit Human	View/Edit Mouse

Butyrophilin subfamily 1 member A1 is a protein that in humans is encoded by the BTN1A1 gene.

Butyrophilin (BTN) is the major protein associated with fat droplets in the milk. It is a member of the immunoglobulin superfamily. It may have a cell surface receptor function. The human butyrophilin gene is localized in the major histocompatibility complex (MHC) class I region of 6p and may have arisen relatively recently in evolution by the shuffling of exons between 2 ancestral gene families

== Function ==
Btn1a1 regulates the amount of lipids and size of droplets expressed in milk. When the gene is compromised in laboratory mice, approximately half the pups died within the first 20 days and the remainder were significantly under-weight.

== Link to multiple sclerosis ==
Butyrophilin has been presented as a potential antigen which may be similar enough to myelin oligodendrocyte glycoprotein (MOG) to spur the immune system to attack myelin in a process known as molecular or epitopic mimicry. This suggests that ingestion of butyrophilin in dairy products from cows and goats may be a potential trigger for multiple sclerosis. Independent studies by a group in Germany have reached similar conclusions.

The German group have used heavy doses of butyrophilin on mice with an experimental model for multiple sclerosis called EAE. They have found that this strategy, called immune tolerance, reduces the effects of the disease.
