= MPZL1 =

Protein-coding gene in humans

Identifiers
- Aliases: MPZL1, MPZL1b, PZR, PZR1b, PZRa, PZRb, myelin protein zero like 1
- External IDs: OMIM: 604376; MGI: 1915731; GeneCards: MPZL1

Gene location (Human)
Chr.	Chromosome 1 (human)
Band	1q24.2	Start	167,721,192 bp
Band	1q24.2	End	167,791,919 bp

Gene location (Mouse)
Chr.	Chromosome 1 (mouse)
Band	1|1 H2.3	Start	165,419,809 bp
Band	1|1 H2.3	End	165,462,107 bp
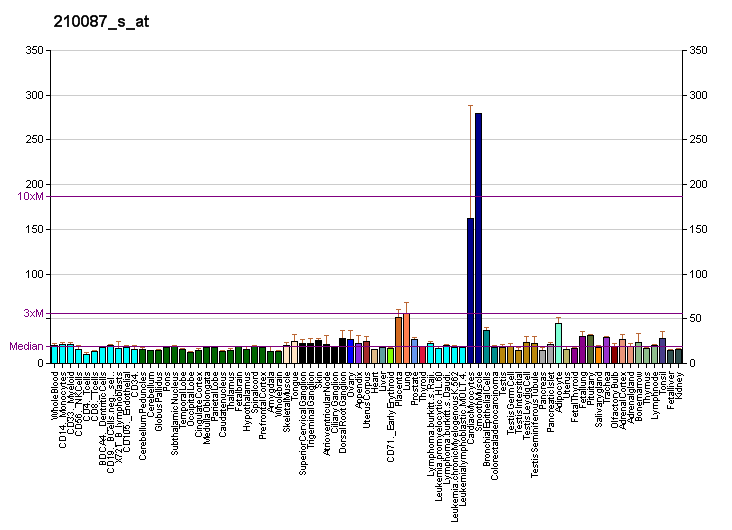

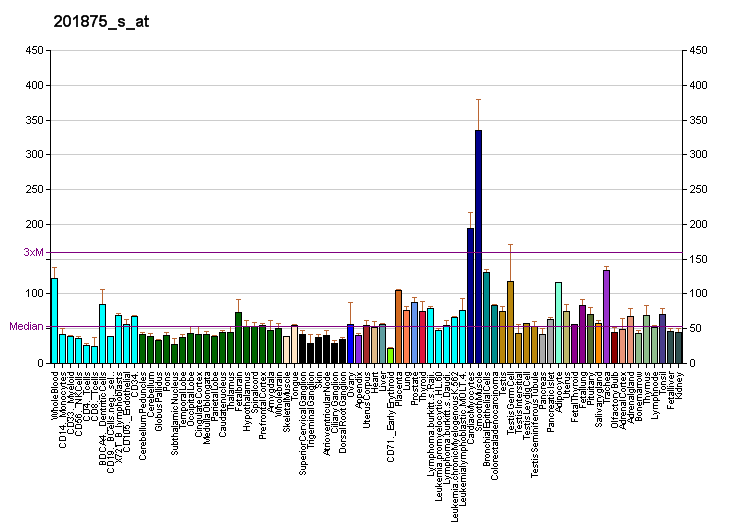

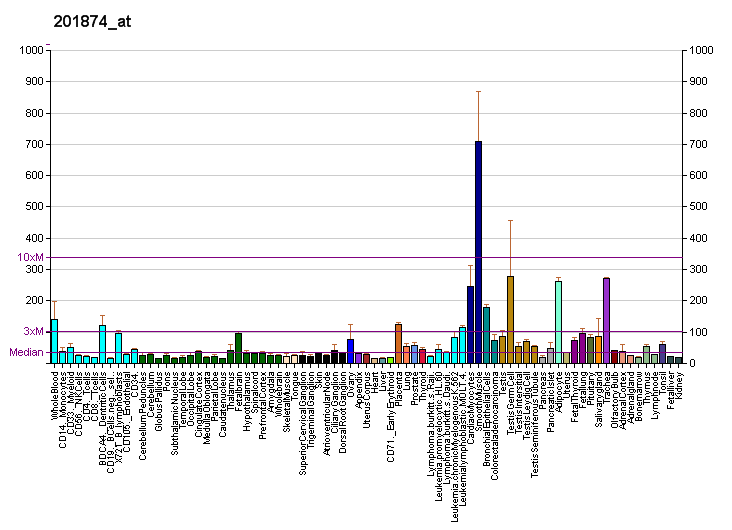
RNA expression pattern
Bgee	Human / Mouse (ortholog); Top expressed in: stromal cell of endometrium; gallbladder; rectum; smooth muscle tissue; minor salivary glands; islet of Langerhans; left uterine tube; gastric mucosa; epithelium of colon; right coronary artery / Top expressed in: otolith organ; utricle; hand; vestibular sensory epithelium; cervix; external carotid artery; vas deferens; Gonadal ridge; superior cervical ganglion; internal carotid artery; More reference expression data
BioGPS	More reference expression data
Gene ontology
Molecular function	protein binding; structural molecule activity
Cellular component	integral component of membrane; cell surface; integral component of plasma membrane; membrane; focal adhesion
Biological process	cell-cell signaling; signal transduction; transmembrane receptor protein tyrosine kinase signaling pathway; positive regulation of cell migration
Sources:Amigo / QuickGO
Orthologs
Databases	NCBI: entry; OMA: entry
Species	Human	Mouse
Entrez	9019	68481
Ensembl	ENSG00000197965	ENSMUSG00000026566
UniProt	O95297	Q3TEW6
RefSeq (mRNA)	NM_024569; NM_001146191; NM_003953	NM_001001880; NM_001083897; NM_001347128
RefSeq (protein)	NP_001139663; NP_003944; NP_078845; NP_003944.1	NP_001001880; NP_001077366; NP_001334057
Location (UCSC)	Chr 1: 167.72 – 167.79 Mb	Chr 1: 165.42 – 165.46 Mb
PubMed search
- Wikidata
View/Edit Human	View/Edit Mouse

Myelin protein zero-like protein 1 is a protein that in humans is encoded by the MPZL1 gene.
