= PARD3 =

Protein-coding gene in the species Homo sapiens

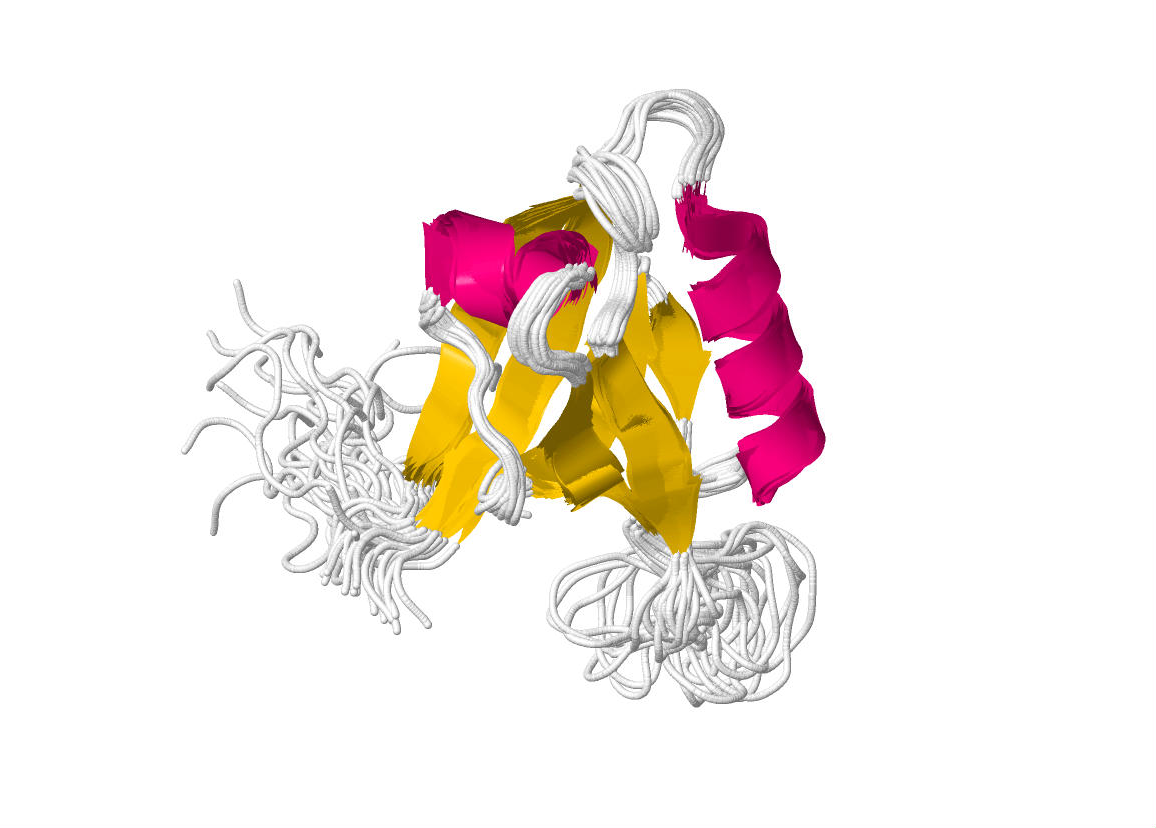

Identifiers
- Aliases: PARD3, ASIP, Baz, PAR3, PAR3alpha, PARD-3, PARD3A, PPP1R118, SE2-5L16, SE2-5LT1, SE2-5T2, par-3 family cell polarity regulator
- External IDs: OMIM: 606745; MGI: 2135608; GeneCards: PARD3
Available structures
PDB	Ortholog search: PDBe RCSB
PDB	List of PDB id codes 2KOM

Gene location (Human)
Chr.	Chromosome 10 (human)
Band	10p11.22-p11.21	Start	34,109,560 bp
Band	10p11.22-p11.21	End	34,815,325 bp

Gene location (Mouse)
Chr.	Chromosome 8 (mouse)
Band	8 E2|8 74.66 cM	Start	127,790,643 bp
Band	8 E2|8 74.66 cM	End	128,338,767 bp
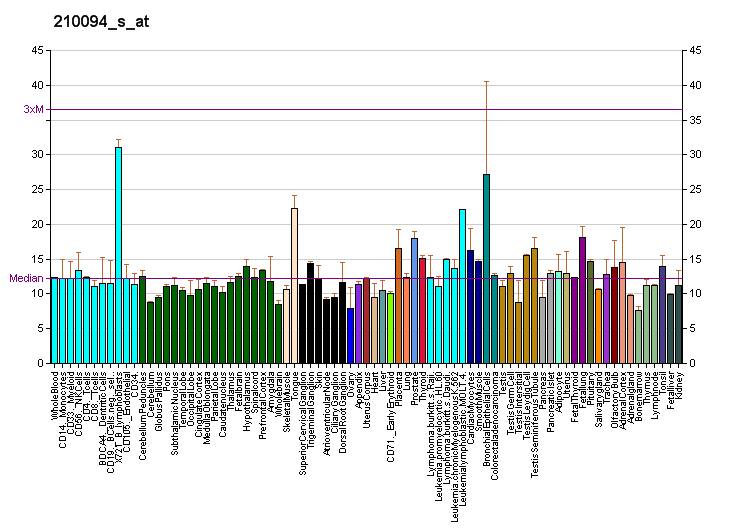

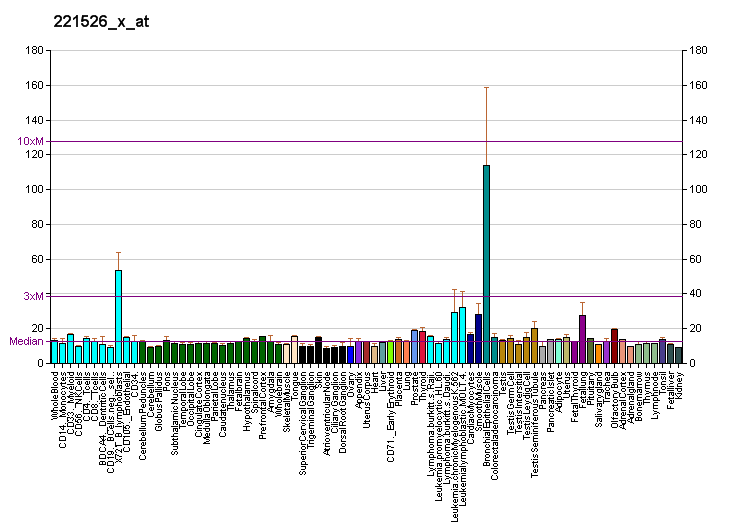

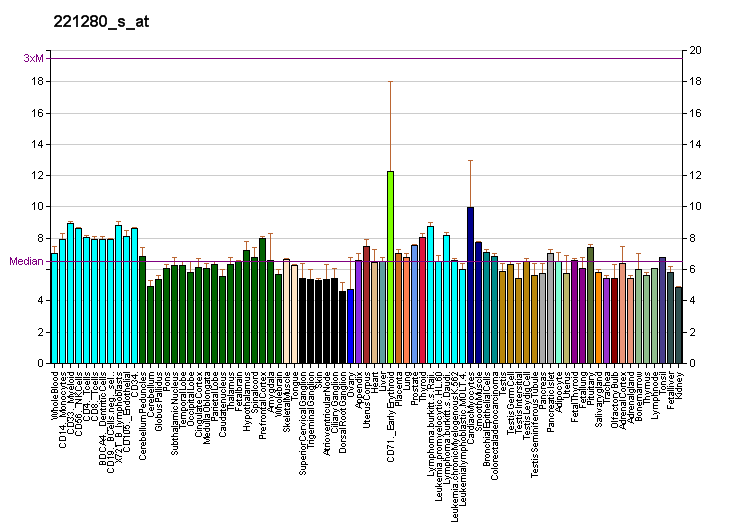
RNA expression pattern
Bgee	Human / Mouse (ortholog); Top expressed in: secondary oocyte; skin of abdomen; skin of leg; buccal mucosa cell; gingival epithelium; nipple; mucosa of pharynx; Achilles tendon; internal globus pallidus; gastric mucosa / Top expressed in: esophagus; lip; tail of embryo; secondary oocyte; conjunctival fornix; transitional epithelium of urinary bladder; genital tubercle; ventricular zone; hand; cornea; More reference expression data
BioGPS	More reference expression data
Gene ontology
Molecular function	phosphatidylinositol-3-phosphate binding; protein binding; phosphatidylinositol-4,5-bisphosphate binding; protein phosphatase binding; phosphatidylinositol-3,4,5-trisphosphate binding; lipid binding; identical protein binding; phosphatidylinositol binding
Cellular component	cytoplasm; cytosol; membrane; cell-cell junction; bicellular tight junction; plasma membrane; axonal growth cone; internode region of axon; cell junction; soma; cell cortex; cytoskeleton; endomembrane system; adherens junction; protein-containing complex; apical plasma membrane; apical junction complex
Biological process	establishment of epithelial cell polarity; cell differentiation; axonogenesis; protein targeting to membrane; negative regulation of peptidyl-threonine phosphorylation; myelination in peripheral nervous system; cell division; establishment or maintenance of cell polarity; positive regulation of myelination; regulation of cellular localization; protein kinase C-activating G protein-coupled receptor signaling pathway; asymmetric cell division; bicellular tight junction assembly; cell cycle; transforming growth factor beta receptor signaling pathway; protein-containing complex assembly; microtubule cytoskeleton organization; cell adhesion; protein localization; establishment of cell polarity; establishment or maintenance of epithelial cell apical/basal polarity; establishment of centrosome localization
Sources:Amigo / QuickGO
Orthologs
Databases	NCBI: entry; OMA: entry
Species	Human	Mouse
Entrez	56288	93742
Ensembl	ENSG00000148498	ENSMUSG00000025812
UniProt	Q8TEW0	Q99NH2
RefSeq (mRNA)	NM_001184785; NM_001184786; NM_001184787; NM_001184788; NM_001184789 NM_001184790; NM_001184791; NM_001184792; NM_001184793; NM_001184794; NM_019619	NM_001013580; NM_001013581; NM_001122850; NM_033620; NM_001309391 NM_001309392; NM_001363431; NM_001363432
RefSeq (protein)	NP_001171714; NP_001171715; NP_001171716; NP_001171717; NP_001171718 NP_001171719; NP_001171720; NP_001171721; NP_001171722; NP_001171723; NP_062565	NP_001013598; NP_001013599; NP_001116322; NP_001296320; NP_001296321 NP_296369; NP_001350360; NP_001350361
Location (UCSC)	Chr 10: 34.11 – 34.82 Mb	Chr 8: 127.79 – 128.34 Mb
PubMed search
- Wikidata
View/Edit Human	View/Edit Mouse

Partitioning defective 3 homolog is a protein that in humans is encoded by the PARD3 gene.

== Function ==
PARD proteins, which were first identified in C. elegans, are essential for asymmetric cell division and polarized growth, whereas CDC42 (MIM 116952) mediates the establishment of cell polarity. The CDC42 GTPase, which is controlled by nucleotide exchange factors (GEFs; see MIM 606057) and GTPase-activating proteins (GAPs; see MIM 604980), interacts with a large set of effector proteins that typically contain a CDC42/RAC (MIM 602048)-interactive binding (CRIB) domain.[supplied by OMIM]

== Interactions ==
PARD3 has been shown to interact with:

- JAM2,
- JAM3,
- PRKCI, and
- PVRL3.
