= ERMAP =

Protein-coding gene in humans

Identifiers
- Aliases: ERMAP, BTN5, PRO2801, RD, SC, erythroblast membrane associated protein (Scianna blood group)
- External IDs: OMIM: 609017; MGI: 1349816; GeneCards: ERMAP

Gene location (Human)
Chr.	Chromosome 1 (human)
Band	1p34.2	Start	42,817,122 bp
Band	1p34.2	End	42,844,991 bp

Gene location (Mouse)
Chr.	Chromosome 4 (mouse)
Band	4 D2.1|4 55.34 cM	Start	119,032,654 bp
Band	4 D2.1|4 55.34 cM	End	119,047,208 bp
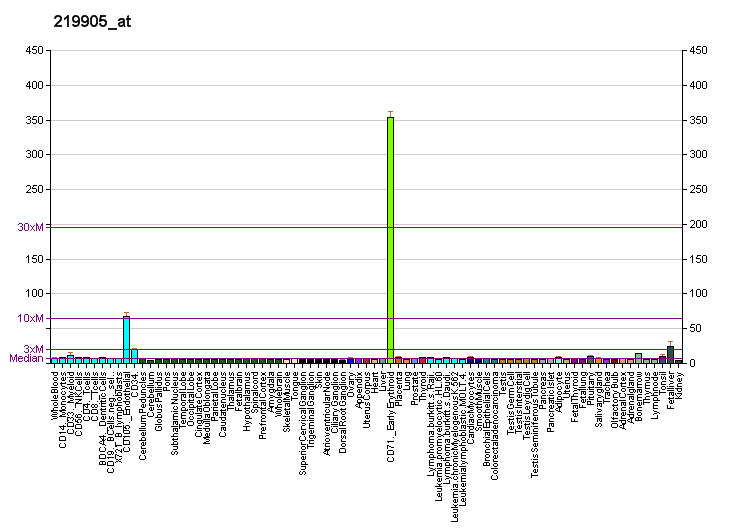
RNA expression pattern
Bgee	Human / Mouse (ortholog); Top expressed in: monocyte; tendon of biceps brachii; right adrenal cortex; right lobe of liver; stromal cell of endometrium; gonad; granulocyte; left adrenal gland; trabecular bone; left adrenal cortex / Top expressed in: fetal liver hematopoietic progenitor cell; tibiofemoral joint; retinal pigment epithelium; human fetus; body of femur; spleen; bone marrow; yolk sac; lens; blood; More reference expression data
BioGPS	More reference expression data
Gene ontology
Molecular function	signaling receptor binding
Cellular component	cytoplasm; membrane; integral component of membrane; plasma membrane; external side of plasma membrane
Biological process	regulation of immune response; T cell receptor signaling pathway
Sources:Amigo / QuickGO
Orthologs
Databases	NCBI: entry; OMA: entry
Species	Human	Mouse
Entrez	114625	27028
Ensembl	ENSG00000164010	ENSMUSG00000028644
UniProt	Q96PL5	Q9JLN5
RefSeq (mRNA)	NM_001017922; NM_018538	NM_013848; NM_001369066
RefSeq (protein)	NP_001017922; NP_061008	NP_038876; NP_001355995
Location (UCSC)	Chr 1: 42.82 – 42.84 Mb	Chr 4: 119.03 – 119.05 Mb
PubMed search
- Wikidata
View/Edit Human	View/Edit Mouse

Erythroid membrane-associated protein is a protein that in humans is responsible for the Scianna blood group system, and is encoded by the ERMAP gene.
