= CD300LB =

Protein-coding gene in humans

Identifiers
- Aliases: CD300LB, CD300b, CLM-7, CLM7, CMRF35-A2, IREM-3, IREM3, TREM-5, TREM5, CD300 molecule like family member b
- External IDs: OMIM: 610705; MGI: 2685099; GeneCards: CD300LB

Gene location (Human)
Chr.	Chromosome 17 (human)
Band	17q25.1	Start	74,521,174 bp
Band	17q25.1	End	74,531,475 bp

Gene location (Mouse)
Chr.	Chromosome 11 (mouse)
Band	11|11 E2	Start	114,813,607 bp
Band	11|11 E2	End	114,825,212 bp
RNA expression pattern
Bgee	Human / Mouse (ortholog); Top expressed in: monocyte; granulocyte; blood; appendix; bone marrow cell; testicle; gallbladder; spleen; right lung; smooth muscle tissue / Top expressed in: granulocyte; stroma of bone marrow; blood; calvaria; spleen; sciatic nerve; embryo; blastocyst; lumbar subsegment of spinal cord; mesenteric lymph nodes; More reference expression data
BioGPS	n/a
Orthologs
Databases	NCBI: entry; OMA: entry
Species	Human	Mouse
Entrez	124599	217304
Ensembl	ENSG00000178789	ENSMUSG00000063193
UniProt	A8K4G0	Q3U497
RefSeq (mRNA)	NM_174892	NM_001037138; NM_199221; NM_001347651
RefSeq (protein)	NP_777552	NP_001334580; NP_954691
Location (UCSC)	Chr 17: 74.52 – 74.53 Mb	Chr 11: 114.81 – 114.83 Mb
PubMed search
- Wikidata
View/Edit Human	View/Edit Mouse

CD300 molecule like family member b is a protein that in humans is encoded by the CD300LB gene.

== Function ==
CD300LB is a nonclassical activating receptor of the immunoglobulin (Ig) superfamily expressed on myeloid cells (Martinez-Barriocanal and Sayos, 2006 [PubMed 16920917]).[supplied by OMIM, Mar 2008].
