= BTN3A3 =

Protein-coding gene in the species Homo sapiens

Identifiers
- Aliases: BTN3A3, BTF3, BTN3.3, butyrophilin subfamily 3 member A3
- External IDs: OMIM: 613595; GeneCards: BTN3A3
Available structures
PDB	Human UniProt search: PDBe RCSB
PDB	List of PDB id codes 4F8T

Gene location (Human)
Chr.	Chromosome 6 (human)
Band	6p22.2	Start	26,440,472 bp
Band	6p22.2	End	26,453,415 bp
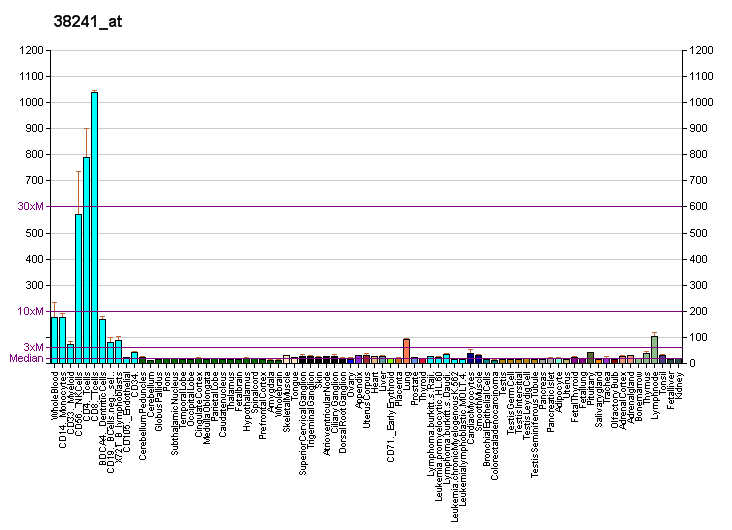

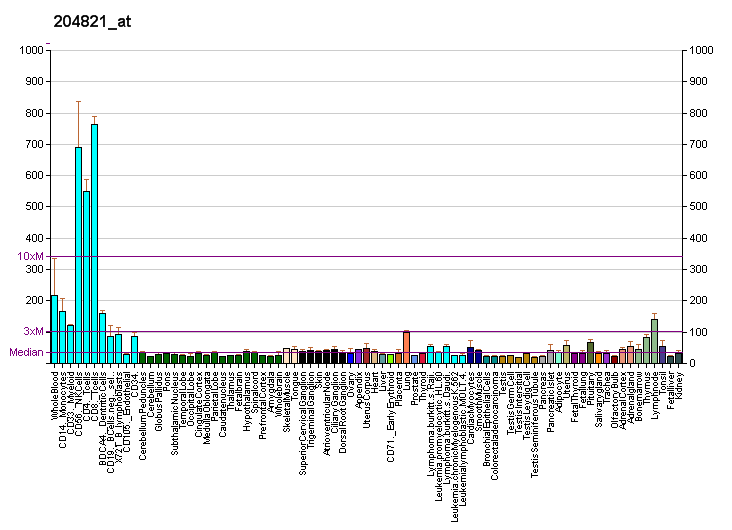

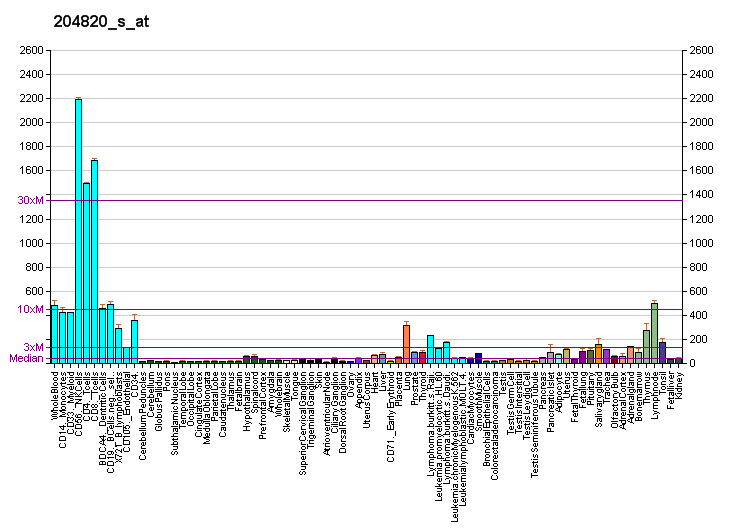
RNA expression pattern
Bgee	Human / Mouse (ortholog); Top expressed in: granulocyte; spleen; monocyte; lymph node; appendix; gallbladder; jejunal mucosa; blood; epithelium of colon; rectum / n/a; More reference expression data
BioGPS	More reference expression data
Gene ontology
Molecular function	signaling receptor binding
Cellular component	integral component of membrane; membrane; plasma membrane; external side of plasma membrane
Biological process	T cell mediated immunity; adaptive immune response; immune system process; regulation of immune response; T cell receptor signaling pathway
Sources:Amigo / QuickGO
Orthologs
Databases	NCBI: entry; OMA: entry
Species	Human	Mouse
Entrez	10384	n/a
Ensembl	ENSG00000111801	n/a
UniProt	O00478	n/a
RefSeq (mRNA)	NM_197974; NM_001242803; NM_006994	n/a
RefSeq (protein)	NP_001229732; NP_008925; NP_932078	n/a
Location (UCSC)	Chr 6: 26.44 – 26.45 Mb	n/a
PubMed search		n/a
- Wikidata
View/Edit Human

Butyrophilin subfamily 3 member A3 is a protein that in humans is encoded by the BTN3A3 gene.
