= CD300LF =

Protein-coding gene in humans

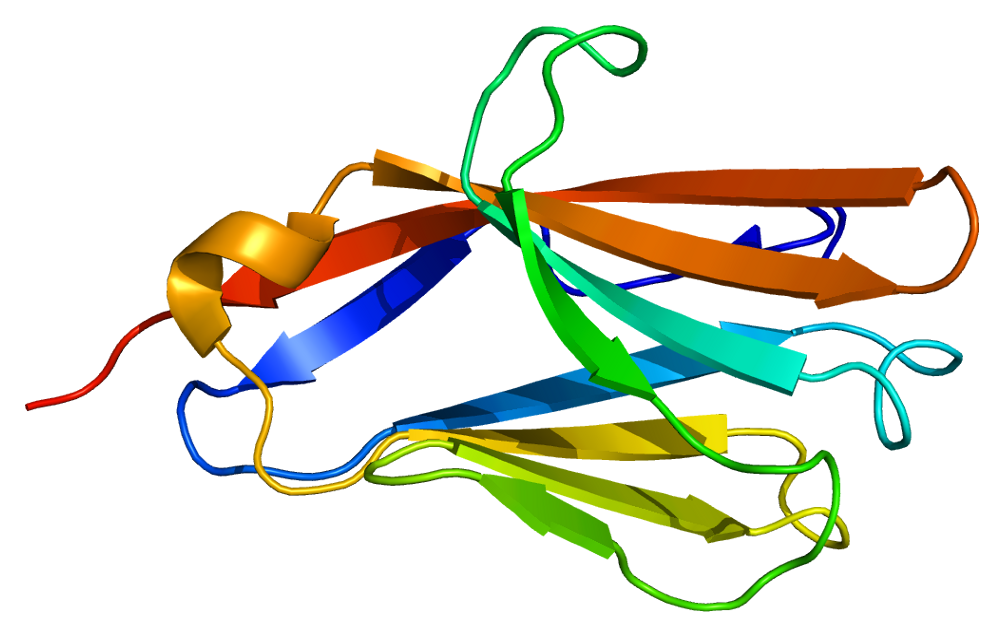

Identifiers
- Aliases: CD300LF, CD300f, CLM-1, CLM1, IREM-1, IREM1, IgSF13, LMIR3, NKIR, CD300 molecule like family member f
- External IDs: OMIM: 609807; MGI: 2442359; GeneCards: CD300LF
Available structures
PDB	Ortholog search: PDBe RCSB
PDB	List of PDB id codes 2NMS

Gene location (Human)
Chr.	Chromosome 17 (human)
Band	17q25.1	Start	74,694,311 bp
Band	17q25.1	End	74,712,978 bp

Gene location (Mouse)
Chr.	Chromosome 11 (mouse)
Band	11|11 E2	Start	115,007,040 bp
Band	11|11 E2	End	115,024,818 bp
RNA expression pattern
Bgee	Human / Mouse (ortholog); Top expressed in: monocyte; granulocyte; blood; testicle; spleen; bone marrow; appendix; bone marrow cell; trabecular bone; upper lobe of left lung / Top expressed in: granulocyte; stroma of bone marrow; secondary oocyte; tibiofemoral joint; zygote; blood; primary oocyte; spleen; mesenteric lymph nodes; right lung lobe; More reference expression data
BioGPS	n/a
Gene ontology
Molecular function	phosphatidylserine binding; interleukin-4 receptor binding; ceramide binding; lipid binding
Cellular component	membrane; integral component of membrane; plasma membrane
Biological process	immune system process; regulation of immune response; negative regulation of mast cell activation; negative regulation of MyD88-dependent toll-like receptor signaling pathway; TRIF-dependent toll-like receptor signaling pathway; interleukin-13-mediated signaling pathway; positive regulation of interleukin-4-mediated signaling pathway; negative regulation of apoptotic cell clearance; positive regulation of apoptotic cell clearance
Sources:Amigo / QuickGO
Orthologs
Databases	NCBI: entry; OMA: entry
Species	Human	Mouse
Entrez	146722	246746
Ensembl	ENSG00000186074	ENSMUSG00000047798
UniProt	Q8TDQ1	Q6SJQ7
RefSeq (mRNA)	NM_001289082; NM_001289083; NM_001289084; NM_001289085; NM_001289086 NM_001289087; NM_139018	NM_001169153; NM_145634; NM_001347648
RefSeq (protein)	NP_001276011; NP_001276012; NP_001276013; NP_001276014; NP_001276015 NP_001276016; NP_620587	NP_001162624; NP_001334577; NP_663609
Location (UCSC)	Chr 17: 74.69 – 74.71 Mb	Chr 11: 115.01 – 115.02 Mb
PubMed search
- Wikidata
View/Edit Human	View/Edit Mouse

CMRF35-like molecule 1, also known as CD300lf, is a protein that in humans is encoded by the CD300LF gene. CD300lf belongs to the protein family of CD300. CD300lf is a membrane glycoprotein that contains an immunoglobulin domain and is expressed by myeloid and mast cells of humans and other mammals. The protein functions in immunoregulation but might also have a role in norovirus infections.

== CD300lf and noroviruses ==
CD300lf has been shown to function as the primary receptor for murine norovirus in mice, Human norovirus does not use the same receptor in viral entry. Human and murine CD300lf proteins have about 59% identity in their immunoglobulin domains, with most of that variation occurring in parts of the protein called CDR3 and the CC'loop. Murine norovirus binds to a cleft between these domains. The differences between murine and human CD300lf contribute to murine norovirus host species restriction, as incorporating murine CD300lf into human cells makes them susceptible to infection by the murine virus.
