= MXRA8 =

Protein-coding gene in humans

Identifiers
- Aliases: MXRA8, matrix remodeling associated 8, ASP3
- External IDs: OMIM: 617293; MGI: 1922011; GeneCards: MXRA8

Gene location (Human)
Chr.	Chromosome 1 (human)
Band	1p36.33	Start	1,352,689 bp
Band	1p36.33	End	1,361,777 bp

Gene location (Mouse)
Chr.	Chromosome 4 (mouse)
Band	4 E2|4 87.58 cM	Start	155,924,137 bp
Band	4 E2|4 87.58 cM	End	155,928,545 bp
RNA expression pattern
Bgee	Human / Mouse (ortholog); Top expressed in: stromal cell of endometrium; tibial nerve; decidua; canal of the cervix; body of uterus; right coronary artery; right ovary; gallbladder; left ovary; ascending aorta / Top expressed in: calvaria; right lung; ankle; body of femur; left lung; right lung lobe; stroma of bone marrow; molar; genital tubercle; trachea; More reference expression data
BioGPS	n/a
Gene ontology
Molecular function	molecular function
Cellular component	integral component of membrane; cell surface; extracellular exosome; membrane; endoplasmic reticulum lumen; nucleus; cytoplasm; plasma membrane; bicellular tight junction; cell junction; cell projection; ciliary membrane
Biological process	establishment of glial blood-brain barrier; post-translational protein modification; viral process; cell adhesion
Sources:Amigo / QuickGO
Orthologs
Databases	NCBI: entry; OMA: entry
Species	Human	Mouse
Entrez	54587	74761
Ensembl	ENSG00000162576	ENSMUSG00000029070
UniProt	Q9BRK3	Q9DBV4
RefSeq (mRNA)	NM_032348; NM_001282582; NM_001282583; NM_001282584; NM_001282585	NM_024263
RefSeq (protein)	NP_001269511; NP_001269512; NP_001269513; NP_001269514; NP_115724	NP_077225
Location (UCSC)	Chr 1: 1.35 – 1.36 Mb	Chr 4: 155.92 – 155.93 Mb
PubMed search
- Wikidata
View/Edit Human	View/Edit Mouse

Matrix remodeling-associated protein 8 is a protein that in humans is encoded by the MXRA8 gene.

MXRA8 protein is a receptor for multiple arthritogenic alphaviruses, including chikungunya, Ross River, Mayaro and O'nyong nyong viruses.
