= Murine norovirus =

Virus classification
- (unranked): Virus
- Realm: Riboviria
- Kingdom: Orthornavirae
- Phylum: Pisuviricota
- Class: Pisoniviricetes
- Order: Picornavirales
- Family: Caliciviridae
- Genus: Norovirus
- Virus: Murine norovirus

Species of virus

Murine norovirus (MNV) is a species of norovirus affecting mice. It was first identified in 2003. MNV is commonly used in research to model Human norovirus because the latter is difficult to grow in the laboratory. Standardized cell cultures are used in MNV propagation and the virus naturally infects mice, which allows studies in animal systems.

== Virology ==
=== Genetics ===
Like all noroviruses, MNV has linear, non-segmented, positive-sense RNA genome of approximately 7.5 kbp, encoding a large polyprotein which is cleaved into six smaller non-structural proteins (NS1/2 to NS7) by the viral 3C-like protease (NS6), a major structural protein (VP1) of about 58~60 kDa and a minor capsid protein (VP2). In addition to these proteins, MNV is unique amongst the noroviruses in possessing an additional fourth open reading frame overlapping the VP1 coding sequence. This additional reading frame encodes a virulence factor (VF1) which regulates the innate immune response. The 3'UTR of the viral genome forms stem-loop structures which have a role in virulence.

=== Entry ===
Entry mechanisms for noroviruses are still largely unknown, but the first proteinaceous receptor mediating norovirus entry was found with experiments on MNV. This receptor, CD300lf, is a membrane glycoprotein, that functions in regulation of multiple immune responses. CD300lf is found on mast cells of both murine species and humans, but definite proof of its function in human norovirus infections remains unknown. In mice however, CD300lf functions in virus binding thus having a role to play in the first steps of viral entry. Binding is essentially mediated by phospholipids of the virus' VP1 protein that bind to a cleft between CDR3 and CC’loop -domains of CD300lf -receptor.
