= TREM1 =

Protein-coding gene in the species Homo sapiens

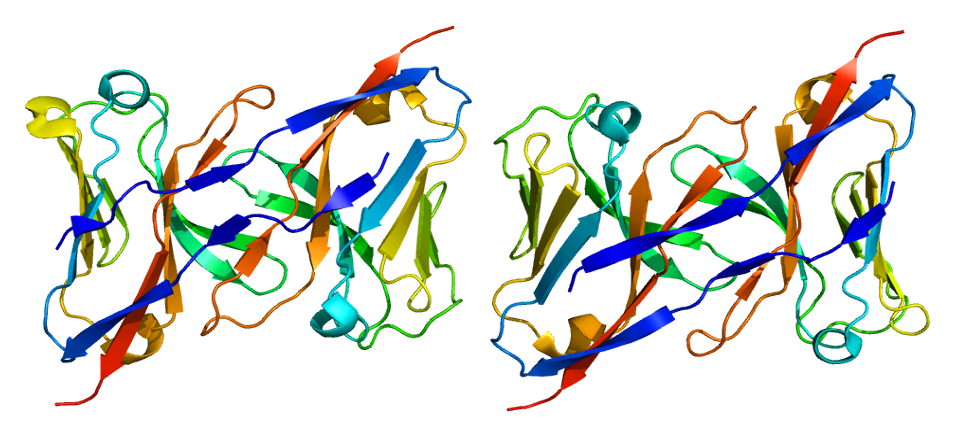

Identifiers
- Aliases: TREM1, CD354, TREM-1, triggering receptor expressed on myeloid cells 1
- External IDs: OMIM: 605085; MGI: 1930005; GeneCards: TREM1
Available structures
PDB	Ortholog search: PDBe RCSB
PDB	List of PDB id codes 1Q8M, 1SMO

Gene location (Human)
Chr.	Chromosome 6 (human)
Band	6p21.1	Start	41,267,926 bp
Band	6p21.1	End	41,286,682 bp

Gene location (Mouse)
Chr.	Chromosome 17 (mouse)
Band	17|17 C	Start	48,539,796 bp
Band	17|17 C	End	48,553,952 bp
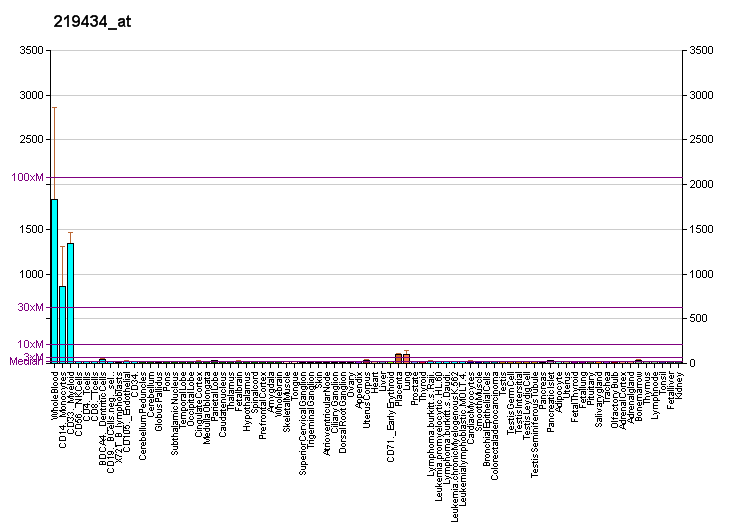
RNA expression pattern
Bgee	Human / Mouse (ortholog); Top expressed in: monocyte; periodontal fiber; blood; right lung; upper lobe of left lung; granulocyte; lower lobe of lung; decidua; bone marrow; bone marrow cell / Top expressed in: granulocyte; bone marrow; embryo; zygote; embryo; secondary oocyte; primary oocyte; spermatid; lung; spleen; More reference expression data
BioGPS	More reference expression data
Gene ontology
Molecular function	scaffold protein binding; signaling receptor activity
Cellular component	integral component of membrane; membrane; plasma membrane; extracellular region; intracellular anatomical structure
Biological process	intracellular signal transduction; humoral immune response; regulation of immune response; innate immune response; leukocyte migration; acute inflammatory response
Sources:Amigo / QuickGO
Orthologs
Databases	NCBI: entry; OMA: entry
Species	Human	Mouse
Entrez	54210	58217
Ensembl	ENSG00000124731	ENSMUSG00000042265
UniProt	Q9NP99	Q9JKE2
RefSeq (mRNA)	NM_001242589; NM_001242590; NM_018643	NM_021406; NM_001347399
RefSeq (protein)	NP_001229518; NP_001229519; NP_061113	NP_001334328; NP_067381
Location (UCSC)	Chr 6: 41.27 – 41.29 Mb	Chr 17: 48.54 – 48.55 Mb
PubMed search
- Wikidata
View/Edit Human	View/Edit Mouse

Triggering receptor expressed on myeloid cells 1 (TREM1) is an immunoglobulin (Ig) superfamily transmembrane protein that, in humans, is encoded by the TREM1 gene. TREM1 is constitutively expressed on the surface of peripheral blood monocytes and neutrophils, and upregulated by toll-like receptor (TLR) ligands; activation of TREM1 amplifies immune responses.

== Expression ==
TREM1 is constitutively expressed on the surface of peripheral blood monocytes and neutrophils. Its expression is upregulated in response to bacterial infection and stimulation with toll-like receptor (TLR) ligands, including lipopolysaccharide and lipoteichoic acid. TREM1 expression is also increased following ischemic stroke. In granulocytes, the transcription factor C/EBPε promotes TREM1 expression independently of inflammatory stimulation.

== Structure ==
TREM1 is a type I transmembrane protein containing a single extracellular immunoglobulin V-set domain, a transmembrane region and a short cytoplasmic tail, The cytoplasmic tail lacks intrinsic signaling motifs. A positively charged lysine residue within the transmembrane region mediates association with the adaptor protein DAP12, which enables intracellular signaling.

== Function ==
TREM1 is an activating receptor that amplifies inflammatory responses mediated by monocytes, macrophages and neutrophils. It acts synergistically with toll-like receptors (TLRs) to enhance the production of inflammatory cytokines.

TREM1 associates with the transmembrane adaptor protein DAP12. Receptor activation initiates a signaling cascade involving Syk tyrosine kinase and downstream mediators including PLCγ, PI3K and MAPK. This signaling promotes inflammatory cytokine and chemokine production, as well as the migration of neutrophils and macrophages.

== Soluble TREM1 ==
During inflammation, a soluble form of the molecule (sTREM1) accumulates in the circulation, and is a biomarker of inflammation. There is debate over whether sTREM1 is produced as a splice variant or as the results of proteolytic cleavage. sTREM1 acts as a decoy for the unknown TREM1 ligands, and thereby prevents TREM1 activation. sTREM1 has been studied as a biomarker of development of pneumonia, sepsis, inflammatory bowel diseases, and liver cirrhosis.

== Clinical significance ==
Based on laboratory studies, TREM1 might be involved in development of atherosclerosis, non-alcoholic fatty liver disease (NAFLD), and ischemic stroke.

=== Cancer ===
TREM1 expression is higher in tumor vs non-tumor tissues, likely due to its expression by myeloid cells that infiltrate tumors. TREM1 is expressed by myeloid immune-suppressive cell populations such as monocytic myeloid-derived suppressor cells (mMDSC), tumor-associated neutrophils (TANs), and tumor associated macrophages (TAMs). These types of tumor-associated myeloid infiltrate correlate with shorter survival times of patients with solid tumors, and are likely to be the reason that not all tumors respond to checkpoint inhibitor therapy. Antibodies that target TREM1 are therefore being studied for use in treatment patients with tumors that do not respond to checkpoint inhibitor therapy.

Flow cytometric analyses of human tumor-infiltrating myeloid cells isolated from breast cancer, bladder cancer, endometrial cancer, head and neck squamous cell carcinoma, ovarian cancer, prostate cancer, and renal cell carcinoma tissues demonstrated that within tumors, TREM1 is enriched on myeloid subsets, including mMDSCs, TANs, TAMs. Single-cell immune profiling of stage III-C ovarian tumor specimens revealed that TREM1 is specifically expressed in TAM and monocytes in these tumors. Additional studies found high expression of TREM1 protein and TREM1 mRNA, respectively, in TAMs and monocytes in human tumors.

Higher levels of TREM1 mRNA in tumor tissues correlate with shorter survival times of patients with colon cancer, breast cancer, pancreatic cancer, and squamous cell carcinoma.

=== As a therapeutic target ===
Pionyr Immunotherapeutics is developing PY159 for treatment of advanced solid tumors refractory to or relapsed with the current standard of care. PY159 is a humanized monoclonal antibody that binds TREM1 and acts as an agonist, crosslinking TREM1 to induce signaling through the TREM1-DAP12 complex. PY159 was evaluated in a phase 1 trial, in combination with pembrolizumab, in subjects with advanced solid tumors.

Celsius Therapeutics is developing CEL383, an antibody inhibitor of TREM1, for treatment of inflammatory bowel disease. As of October 2023, CEL383 is being evaluated in a phase 1 trial in healthy volunteers.

As of 2026, nangibotide, a polypeptide inhibitor of TREM1, is the most clinically advanced inhibitor.

== Model organisms ==
Model organisms have been used in the study of TREM1 function. A conditional knockout mouse line called Trem1^{tm1(KOMP)Vlcg} was generated at the Wellcome Trust Sanger Institute. Male and female animals underwent a standardized phenotypic screen to determine the effects of deletion. Additional screens included immune phenotyping. Blockade of TREM1 protects mice against microbe-induced shock, indicating that it is an important regulator of the immune response.
