= JAM2 =

Protein-coding gene in the species Homo sapiens

Identifiers
- Aliases: JAM2, C21orf43, CD322, JAM-B, JAMB, PRO245, VE-JAM, VEJAM, junctional adhesion molecule 2, IBGC8
- External IDs: OMIM: 606870; MGI: 1933820; GeneCards: JAM2

Gene location (Human)
Chr.	Chromosome 21 (human)
Band	21q21.3	Start	25,639,258 bp
Band	21q21.3	End	25,717,562 bp

Gene location (Mouse)
Chr.	Chromosome 16 (mouse)
Band	16|16 C3.3	Start	84,571,011 bp
Band	16|16 C3.3	End	84,622,816 bp
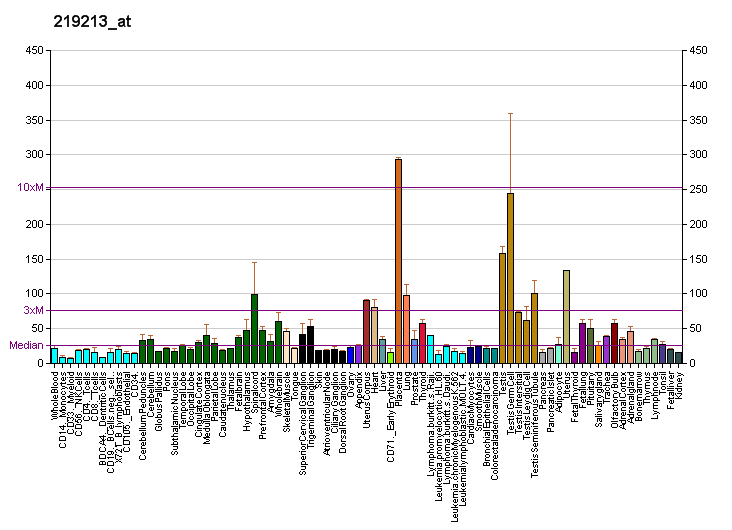
RNA expression pattern
Bgee	Human / Mouse (ortholog); Top expressed in: ventricular zone; tendon of biceps brachii; vena cava; internal globus pallidus; ganglionic eminence; pericardium; gastric mucosa; body of uterus; epithelium of colon; tibial nerve / Top expressed in: interventricular septum; myocardium of ventricle; cumulus cell; right ventricle; cardiac muscles; neural layer of retina; deep cerebellar nuclei; iris; epithelium of lens; substantia nigra; More reference expression data
BioGPS	More reference expression data
Gene ontology
Molecular function	protein binding; protein heterodimerization activity
Cellular component	integral component of membrane; cell junction; plasma membrane; integral component of plasma membrane; membrane; bicellular tight junction
Biological process	negative regulation of cell adhesion; extracellular matrix organization; leukocyte migration; cell-cell adhesion
Sources:Amigo / QuickGO
Orthologs
Databases	NCBI: entry; OMA: entry
Species	Human	Mouse
Entrez	58494	67374
Ensembl	ENSG00000154721	ENSMUSG00000053062
UniProt	P57087	Q9JI59
RefSeq (mRNA)	NM_001270407; NM_001270408; NM_021219	NM_023844
RefSeq (protein)	NP_001257336; NP_001257337; NP_067042	NP_076333
Location (UCSC)	Chr 21: 25.64 – 25.72 Mb	Chr 16: 84.57 – 84.62 Mb
PubMed search
- Wikidata
View/Edit Human	View/Edit Mouse

Junctional adhesion molecule B is a protein that in humans is encoded by the JAM2 gene. JAM2 has also been designated as CD322 (cluster of differentiation 322).

== Function ==
Tight junctions represent one mode of cell-to-cell adhesion in endothelial cell sheets, forming continuous seals around cells and serving as a physical barrier to prevent solutes and water from passing freely through the paracellular space. The protein encoded by this immunoglobulin superfamily gene member is localized in the tight junctions between high endothelial cells. It acts as an adhesive ligand for interacting with a variety of immune cell types and may play a role in lymphocyte homing to secondary lymphoid organs.

It is purported to promote lymphocyte transendothelial migration. It might also be involved with endothelial cell polarity, by associating to cell polarity protein PARD3 (PAR-3), together with JAM3.

== Interactions ==
JAM2 has been shown to interact with PARD3.

It also interacts with the integrin dimer VLA-4 (also called α4β1).
