= F11 receptor =

Protein found in humans

F11R
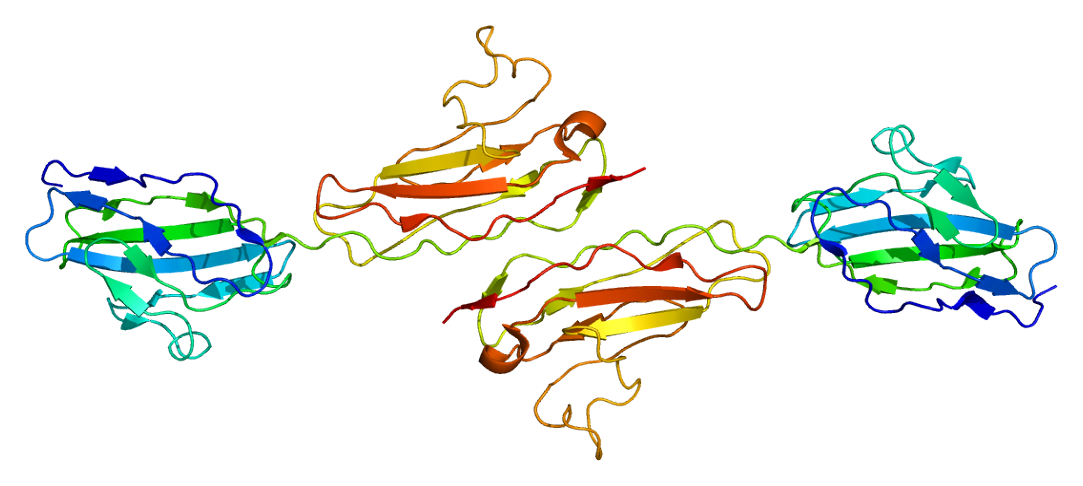

Identifiers
- Aliases: F11R, F11r, 9130004G24, AA638916, ESTM33, JAM, JAM-1, JAM-A, Jcam, Jcam1, Ly106, CD321, JAM1, JAMA, KAT, PAM-1, F11 receptor
- External IDs: OMIM: 605721; MGI: 1321398; GeneCards: F11R
Available structures
PDB	Ortholog search: PDBe RCSB
PDB	List of PDB id codes 1NBQ, 3EOY, 3TSZ, 4ODB

Gene location (Human)
Chr.	Chromosome 1 (human)
Band	1q23.3	Start	160,995,211 bp
Band	1q23.3	End	161,021,343 bp

Gene location (Mouse)
Chr.	Chromosome 1 (mouse)
Band	1 H3|1 79.43 cM	Start	171,265,103 bp
Band	1 H3|1 79.43 cM	End	171,292,171 bp
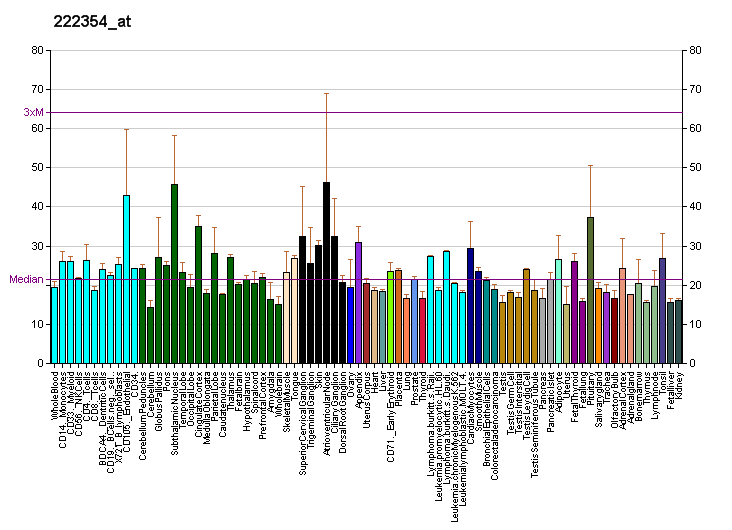

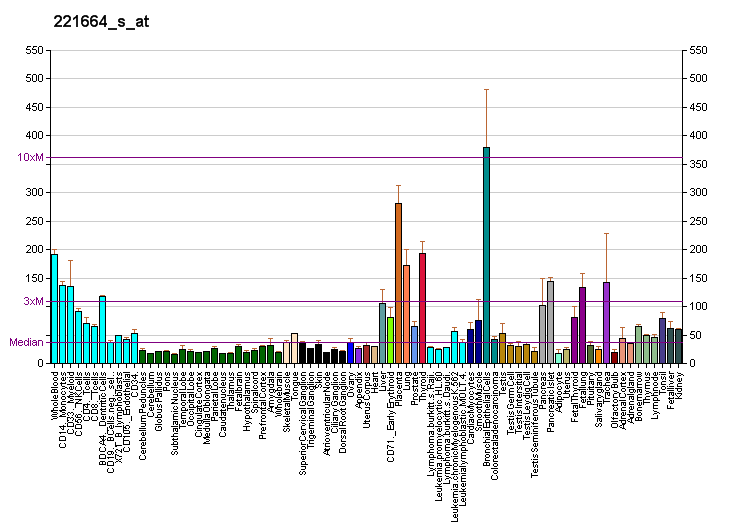
RNA expression pattern
Bgee	Human / Mouse (ortholog); Top expressed in: olfactory zone of nasal mucosa; right lung; rectum; islet of Langerhans; upper lobe of left lung; mucosa of transverse colon; minor salivary glands; gallbladder; skin of abdomen; left lobe of thyroid gland / Top expressed in: saccule; otic placode; corneal stroma; left lung lobe; otic vesicle; lactiferous gland; choroid plexus of fourth ventricle; transitional epithelium of urinary bladder; epithelium of stomach; large intestine; More reference expression data
BioGPS	More reference expression data
Gene ontology
Molecular function	PDZ domain binding; virus receptor activity; protein binding; cadherin binding
Cellular component	integral component of membrane; membrane; cell-cell junction; bicellular tight junction; plasma membrane; slit diaphragm; extracellular exosome; cytoplasmic vesicle; cell junction
Biological process	regulation of actin cytoskeleton reorganization; cell differentiation; establishment of endothelial intestinal barrier; epithelial cell differentiation; actomyosin structure organization; extracellular matrix organization; regulation of membrane permeability; regulation of cytokine production; positive regulation of GTPase activity; positive regulation of blood pressure; cell adhesion; negative regulation of GTPase activity; bicellular tight junction assembly; viral entry into host cell; intestinal absorption; response to radiation; inflammatory response; viral process; transforming growth factor beta receptor signaling pathway; leukocyte migration; protein localization to plasma membrane
Sources:Amigo / QuickGO
Orthologs
Databases	NCBI: entry; OMA: entry
Species	Human	Mouse
Entrez	50848	16456
Ensembl	ENSG00000158769	ENSMUSG00000038235
UniProt	Q9Y624	O88792
RefSeq (mRNA)	NM_016946; NM_144501; NM_144502; NM_144503; NM_144504 NM_001348091; NM_001382727; NM_001382730; NM_001382733; NM_001382734	NM_172647
RefSeq (protein)	NP_058642; NP_001335020; NP_001369656; NP_001369659; NP_001369662 NP_001369663	NP_766235
Location (UCSC)	Chr 1: 161 – 161.02 Mb	Chr 1: 171.27 – 171.29 Mb
PubMed search
- Wikidata
View/Edit Human	View/Edit Mouse

Junctional adhesion molecule A (JAM-A) is a protein that in humans is encoded by the F11R gene. It has also been designated as CD321 (cluster of differentiation 321). JAM-A (also known as F11R, JAM-1) was the first of the junctional adhesion molecules to be discovered, and is located in the tight junctions of both epithelial and endothelial cells.

== Function ==
Tight junctions represent one mode of cell-to-cell adhesion in epithelial or endothelial cell sheets, forming continuous seals around cells and serving as a physical barrier to prevent solutes and water from passing freely through the paracellular space. JAM-A is part of the immunoglobulin superfamily and is an important regulator of tight junction assembly in epithelia. In addition, the encoded protein can act as (1) a receptor for reovirus, (2) a ligand for the integrin LFA1, involved in leukocyte transmigration, and (3) a platelet receptor.

JAM-A interacts with cells in a homophilic manner in order to preserve the structure of the junction while moderating its permeability. It can also interact with receptors as a heterophilic structure by acting as a ligand for LFA-1 and facilitating leukocyte transmigration. JAM-A also plays a significant role in many different cellular functions, including being both a reovirus receptor and a platelet receptor.

== Interactions ==
F11 receptor has been shown to interact with MLLT4, CASK and Tight junction protein 1.
