= TREML1 =

Protein-coding gene in the species Homo sapiens

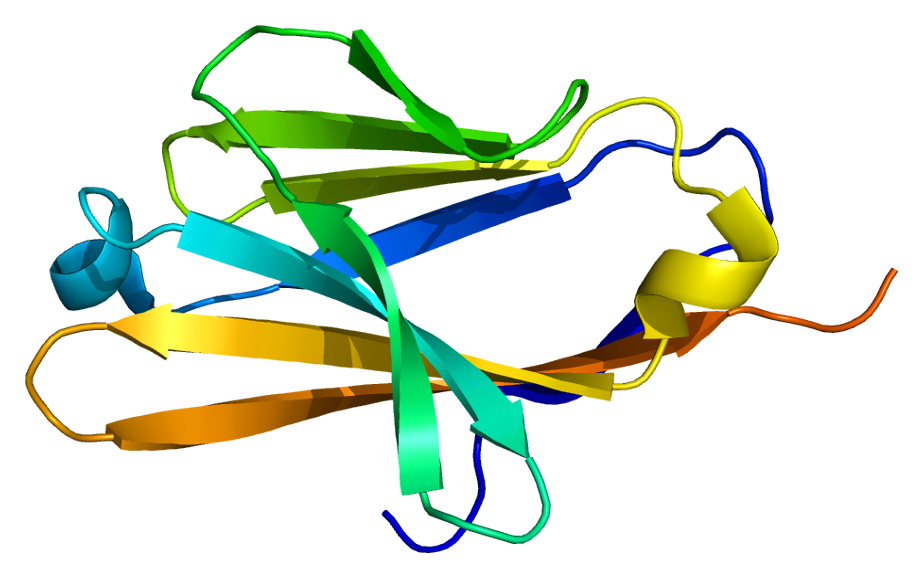

Identifiers
- Aliases: TREML1, GLTL1825, PRO3438, TLT-1, TLT1, dJ238O23.3, triggering receptor expressed on myeloid cells like 1
- External IDs: OMIM: 609714; MGI: 1918576; GeneCards: TREML1
Available structures
PDB	Ortholog search: PDBe RCSB
PDB	List of PDB id codes 2FRG

Gene location (Human)
Chr.	Chromosome 6 (human)
Band	6p21.1	Start	41,149,337 bp
Band	6p21.1	End	41,154,347 bp

Gene location (Mouse)
Chr.	Chromosome 17 (mouse)
Band	17|17 C	Start	48,666,944 bp
Band	17|17 C	End	48,674,204 bp
RNA expression pattern
Bgee	Human / Mouse (ortholog); Top expressed in: monocyte; blood; granulocyte; spleen; appendix; C1 segment; bone marrow cell; lymph node; right lung; upper lobe of left lung / Top expressed in: bone marrow; spleen; embryo; lobe of liver; white adipose tissue; morula; yolk sac; placenta; lung; heart; More reference expression data
BioGPS	n/a
Gene ontology
Molecular function	protein binding
Cellular component	cytoplasm; integral component of membrane; plasma membrane; membrane; cell surface; platelet alpha granule
Biological process	innate immune response; calcium-mediated signaling; regulation of immune response; platelet activation
Sources:Amigo / QuickGO
Orthologs
Databases	NCBI: entry; OMA: entry
Species	Human	Mouse
Entrez	340205	71326
Ensembl	ENSG00000161911	ENSMUSG00000023993
UniProt	Q86YW5	Q8K558
RefSeq (mRNA)	NM_178174; NM_001271807; NM_001271808	NM_001289451; NM_001289457; NM_027763
RefSeq (protein)	NP_001258736; NP_001258737; NP_835468	NP_001276380; NP_001276386; NP_082039
Location (UCSC)	Chr 6: 41.15 – 41.15 Mb	Chr 17: 48.67 – 48.67 Mb
PubMed search
- Wikidata
View/Edit Human	View/Edit Mouse

Trem-like transcript 1 protein is a protein that in humans is encoded by the TREML1 gene.

TREML1 is located in a gene cluster on chromosome 6 with the single Ig variable (IgV) domain activating receptors TREM1 (MIM 605085) and TREM2 (MIM 605086), but it has distinct structural and functional properties.

TREML1 enhances calcium signaling in an SHP2 (PTPN11; MIM 176876)-dependent manner (Allcock et al., 2003; Barrow et al., 2004) [supplied by OMIM].
