= T cell receptor beta constant 1 =

Gene in the species Homo sapiens

TRBC1
Available structures
PDB	Human UniProt search: PDBe RCSB
PDB	List of PDB id codes 1FYT, 1J8H, 1KGC, 1KTK, 1MI5, 1OGA, 1YMM, 1ZGL, 2AK4, 2AXH, 2BNR, 2BNU, 2CDE, 2CDF, 2CDG, 2ESV, 2F54, 2GJ6, 2IAL, 2IAM, 2IAN, 2NTS, 2NW2, 2NX5, 2XN9, 2XNA, 3ARB, 3ARD, 3ARE, 3ARF, 3ARG, 3D39, 3D3V, 3FFC, 3HE6, 3HG1, 3KPR, 3KPS, 3O4L, 3TN0, 4G8E, 4G8F, 4GG6, 4GG8, 4IIQ, 4JFD, 4JFE, 4JFF, 4JFH, 4JRX, 4JRY, 4L4T, 4L4V, 4L9L, 4LCC, 4LCW, 4MJI, 4MNQ, 4NQC, 4NQD, 4NQE, 4OZF, 4OZG, 4OZH, 4OZI, 4P46, 4PRH, 4PRI, 4PRP, 4X6B, 4X6C, 4X6D, 2BNQ, 4ZDH

Identifiers
- Aliases: TRBC1, BV05S1J2.2, TCRB, TCRBC1, T cell receptor beta constant 1
- External IDs: OMIM: 186930; GeneCards: TRBC1; OMA:TRBC1 - orthologs

Gene location (Human)
Chr.	Chromosome 7 (human)
Band	7q34	Start	142,791,694 bp
Band	7q34	End	142,793,368 bp
RNA expression pattern
Bgee	Human / Mouse (ortholog); Top expressed in: granulocyte; lymph node; appendix; blood; spleen; gonad; gallbladder; testicle; duodenum; mucosa of transverse colon / n/a; More reference expression data
BioGPS	n/a
Gene ontology
Molecular function	antigen binding; immunoglobulin receptor binding
Cellular component	integral component of membrane; plasma membrane; membrane; external side of plasma membrane; immunoglobulin complex, circulating; blood microparticle; T cell receptor complex
Biological process	regulation of immune response; T cell receptor signaling pathway; immune response; phagocytosis, recognition; phagocytosis, engulfment; complement activation, classical pathway; defense response to bacterium; innate immune response; B cell receptor signaling pathway; positive regulation of B cell activation; adaptive immune response; immune system process
Sources:Amigo / QuickGO
Orthologs
Species	Human	Mouse
Entrez	28639	n/a
Ensembl	ENSG00000211751	n/a
UniProt	P01850	n/a
RefSeq (mRNA)	n/a	n/a
RefSeq (protein)	n/a	n/a
Location (UCSC)	Chr 7: 142.79 – 142.79 Mb	n/a
PubMed search		n/a
- Wikidata
View/Edit Human

T cell receptor beta constant 1 is a protein that in humans is encoded by the TRBC1 gene.
