= Butyrophilin, subfamily 3, member A1 =

Protein-coding gene in the species Homo sapiens

BTN3A1

Identifiers
- Aliases: BTN3A1, BT3.1, BTF5, BTN3.1, CD277, Butyrophilin, subfamily 3, member A1, butyrophilin subfamily 3 member A1
- External IDs: OMIM: 613593; GeneCards: BTN3A1
Available structures
PDB	Human UniProt search: PDBe RCSB
PDB	List of PDB id codes 4F80, 4F9L, 4F9P, 4JKW, 4K55, 4N7I, 4N7U, 4V1P

Gene location (Human)
Chr.	Chromosome 6 (human)
Band	6p22.2	Start	26,402,237 bp
Band	6p22.2	End	26,415,208 bp
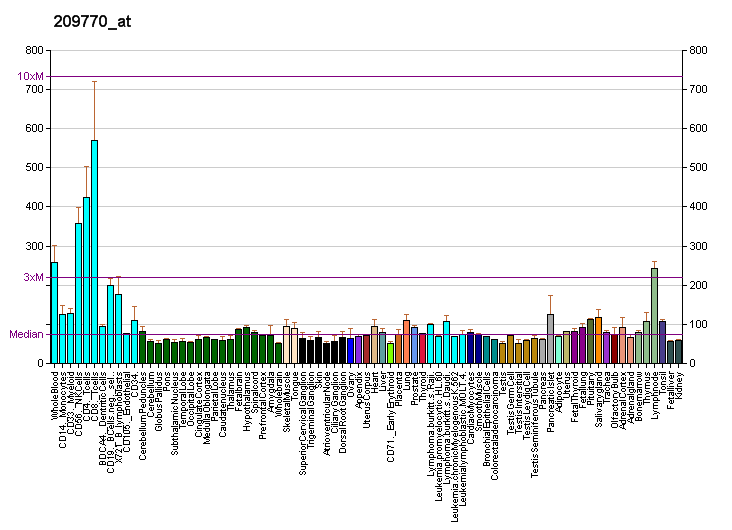

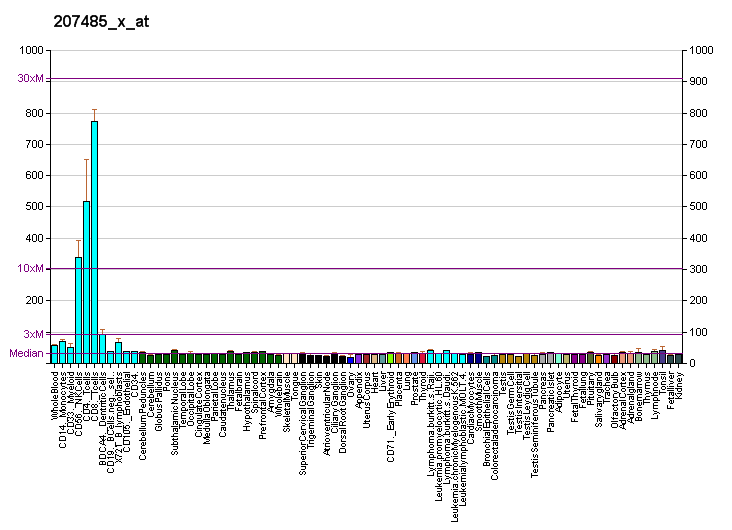
RNA expression pattern
Bgee	Human / Mouse (ortholog); Top expressed in: granulocyte; spleen; pancreatic ductal cell; lymph node; monocyte; blood; rectum; gallbladder; appendix; epithelium of colon / n/a; More reference expression data
BioGPS	More reference expression data
Gene ontology
Molecular function	protein binding; signaling receptor binding
Cellular component	integral component of membrane; membrane; plasma membrane; external side of plasma membrane
Biological process	activated T cell proliferation; T cell receptor signaling pathway; adaptive immune response; immune system process; regulation of immune response
Sources:Amigo / QuickGO
Orthologs
Databases	NCBI: entry; OMA: entry
Species	Human	Mouse
Entrez	11119	n/a
Ensembl	ENSG00000026950	n/a
UniProt	O00481	n/a
RefSeq (mRNA)	NM_001145008; NM_001145009; NM_007048; NM_194441	n/a
RefSeq (protein)	NP_001138480; NP_001138481; NP_008979; NP_919423	n/a
Location (UCSC)	Chr 6: 26.4 – 26.42 Mb	n/a
PubMed search		n/a
- Wikidata
View/Edit Human

Butyrophilin subfamily 3 member A1 is a protein that in humans is encoded by the BTN3A1 gene. BTN3A1 protein is involved in innate immunity in primates and other mammals to protect them against pathogens and cancer.

== Function ==
The intracellular domain of BTN3A1 protein binds intracellular phosphoantigens. Accumulation of phosphoantigens such as isopentenyl Pyrophosphate (IPP) is a universal sign of cellular stress or infection by an intracellular bacterium. The binding of phosphoantigens to BTN3A1 leads to an allosterically mediated change in conformation of BTN3A1's extracellular domain. This changed conformation is detected by the T cell receptor on cytotoxic gamma delta T cells, which can then kill the stressed or infected cell.
