= CD300C =

Protein-coding gene in humans

Identifiers
- Aliases: CD300C, CLM-6, CMRF-35, CMRF-35A, CMRF35, CMRF35-A1, CMRF35A, CMRF35A1, IGSF16, LIR, CD300c molecule
- External IDs: OMIM: 606786; MGI: 2153249; GeneCards: CD300C

Gene location (Human)
Chr.	Chromosome 17 (human)
Band	17q25.1	Start	74,541,073 bp
Band	17q25.1	End	74,546,115 bp

Gene location (Mouse)
Chr.	Chromosome 11 (mouse)
Band	11 E2|11 80.57 cM	Start	114,887,547 bp
Band	11 E2|11 80.57 cM	End	114,892,706 bp
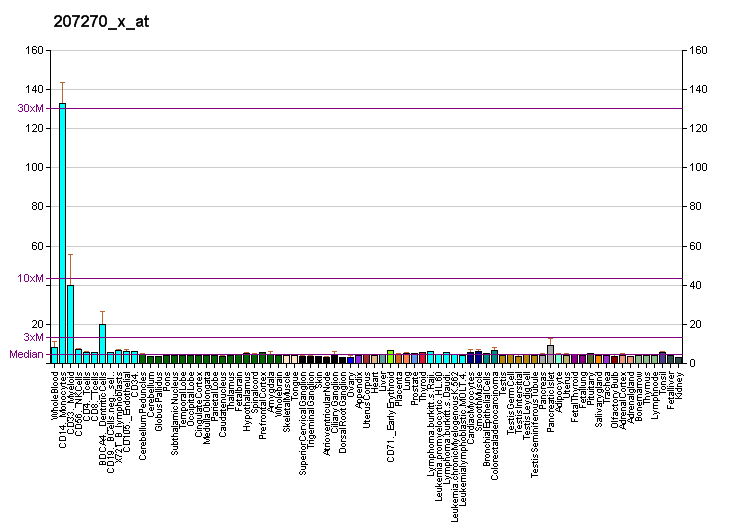
RNA expression pattern
Bgee	Human / Mouse (ortholog); Top expressed in: monocyte; granulocyte; blood; spleen; upper lobe of left lung; appendix; right lung; bone marrow; right coronary artery; Descending thoracic aorta / Top expressed in: stroma of bone marrow; granulocyte; spleen; blood; calvaria; right lung lobe; mesenteric lymph nodes; tibiofemoral joint; thymus; seminal vesicula; More reference expression data
BioGPS	More reference expression data
Gene ontology
Molecular function	transmembrane signaling receptor activity
Cellular component	integral component of membrane; plasma membrane; integral component of plasma membrane; membrane
Biological process	cellular defense response; immune system process; regulation of immune response; signal transduction
Sources:Amigo / QuickGO
Orthologs
Databases	NCBI: entry; OMA: entry
Species	Human	Mouse
Entrez	10871	140497
Ensembl	ENSG00000167850	ENSMUSG00000044811
UniProt	Q08708	Q7TSN2
RefSeq (mRNA)	NM_006678	NM_134158
RefSeq (protein)	NP_006669	NP_598919
Location (UCSC)	Chr 17: 74.54 – 74.55 Mb	Chr 11: 114.89 – 114.89 Mb
PubMed search
- Wikidata
View/Edit Human	View/Edit Mouse

CMRF35-like molecule 6 (CLM-6) also known as CD300 antigen-like family member C (CD300c) is a protein that in humans is encoded by the CD300C gene.

The CMRF35 antigen, which was identified by reactivity with a monoclonal antibody, is present on monocytes, neutrophils, and some T and B lymphocytes.
