= JAM3 =

Protein-coding gene in the species Homo sapiens

Identifiers
- Aliases: JAM3, JAM-2, JAM-3, JAM-C, JAMC, junctional adhesion molecule 3
- External IDs: OMIM: 606871; MGI: 1933825; GeneCards: JAM3

Gene location (Human)
Chr.	Chromosome 11 (human)
Band	11q25	Start	134,069,071 bp
Band	11q25	End	134,152,001 bp

Gene location (Mouse)
Chr.	Chromosome 9 (mouse)
Band	9|9 A4	Start	27,008,680 bp
Band	9|9 A4	End	27,066,717 bp
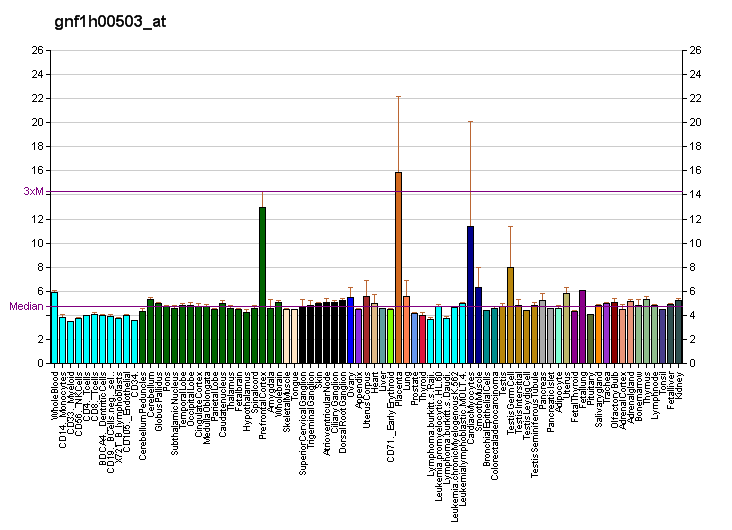

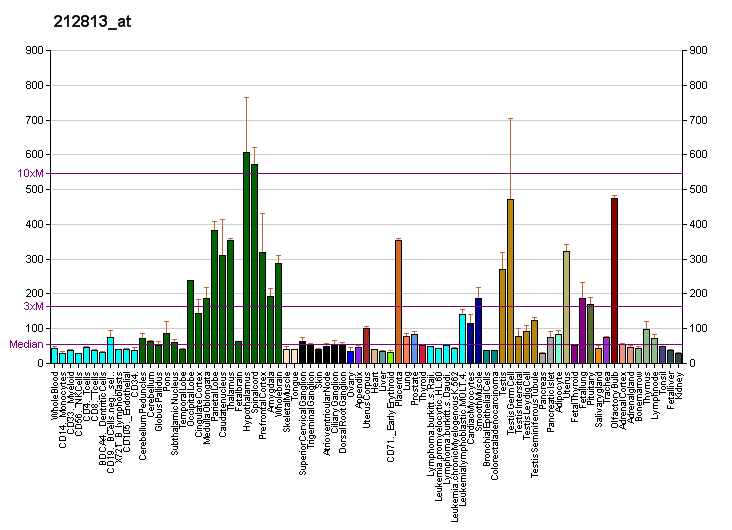
RNA expression pattern
Bgee	Human / Mouse (ortholog); Top expressed in: corpus callosum; inferior ganglion of vagus nerve; ventricular zone; olfactory bulb; globus pallidus; internal globus pallidus; external globus pallidus; trigeminal ganglion; saphenous vein; subthalamic nucleus / Top expressed in: sciatic nerve; ventricular zone; spermatocyte; lens; utricle; spermatid; extraocular muscle; neural tube; medial ganglionic eminence; epiblast; More reference expression data
BioGPS	More reference expression data
Gene ontology
Molecular function	protein homodimerization activity; integrin binding; protein binding; protein heterodimerization activity
Cellular component	integral component of membrane; membrane; cell-cell contact zone; cell-cell junction; bicellular tight junction; plasma membrane; desmosome; Schmidt-Lanterman incisure; extracellular region; cell junction; paranodal junction; extracellular space; Golgi apparatus; integral component of plasma membrane
Biological process	neutrophil homeostasis; regulation of neutrophil chemotaxis; regulation of actin cytoskeleton organization by cell-cell adhesion; myeloid progenitor cell differentiation; adaptive immune response; axon regeneration; transmission of nerve impulse; leukocyte migration involved in inflammatory response; extracellular matrix organization; cell adhesion; angiogenesis; spermatogenesis; establishment of cell polarity; spermatid development; myelination; cell-matrix adhesion; cell migration; leukocyte migration; cell differentiation
Sources:Amigo / QuickGO
Orthologs
Databases	NCBI: entry; OMA: entry
Species	Human	Mouse
Entrez	83700	83964
Ensembl	ENSG00000166086	ENSMUSG00000031990
UniProt	Q9BX67	Q9D8B7
RefSeq (mRNA)	NM_032801; NM_001205329	NM_023277
RefSeq (protein)	NP_001192258; NP_116190	NP_075766
Location (UCSC)	Chr 11: 134.07 – 134.15 Mb	Chr 9: 27.01 – 27.07 Mb
PubMed search
- Wikidata
View/Edit Human	View/Edit Mouse

Junctional adhesion molecule C is a protein that in humans is encoded by the JAM3 gene.

== Gene ==
This gene is located on the long arm of chromosome 11 (11q25) on the Watson strand. It is 83,077 bases in length. The encoded protein is 310 amino acids long with a predicted molecular weight of 35.02 kilodaltons.

== Function ==
Tight junctions represent one mode of cell-to-cell adhesion in epithelial or endothelial cell sheets, forming continuous seals around cells and serving as a physical barrier to prevent solutes and water from passing freely through the paracellular space. The protein encoded by this immunoglobulin superfamily gene member is localized in the tight junctions between high endothelial cells. Unlike other proteins in this family, this protein is unable to adhere to leukocyte cell lines and only forms weak homotypic interactions. The encoded protein is a member of the junctional adhesion molecule protein family and acts as a receptor for another member of this family.

== Interactions ==
JAM3 has been shown to interact with PARD3.

== Clinical significance ==
Loss-of-function mutations in this gene cause a rare syndrome - autosomal recessive hemorrhagic destruction of the brain, subependymal calcification and congenital cataracts.
