= V-set immunoregulatory receptor =

Protein found in humans

VSIR

Identifiers
- Aliases: VSIR, B7-H5, B7H5, GI24, PP2135, SISP1, DD1alpha, VISTA, C10orf54, chromosome 10 open reading frame 54, PD-1H, V-set immunoregulatory receptor, Dies1
- External IDs: OMIM: 615608; MGI: 1921298; GeneCards: VSIR

Gene location (Human)
Chr.	Chromosome 10 (human)
Band	10q22.1	Start	71,747,556 bp
Band	10q22.1	End	71,773,520 bp

Gene location (Mouse)
Chr.	Chromosome 10 (mouse)
Band	10|10 B4	Start	60,182,630 bp
Band	10|10 B4	End	60,208,463 bp
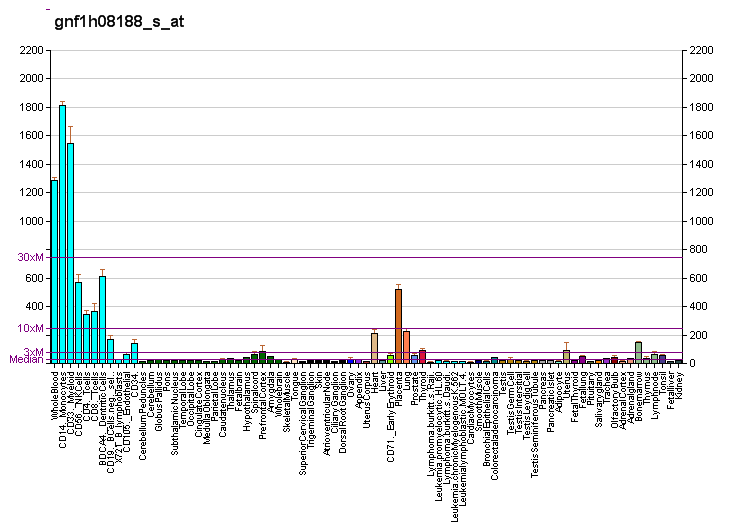
RNA expression pattern
Bgee	Human / Mouse (ortholog); Top expressed in: granulocyte; monocyte; blood; bone marrow cell; spleen; appendix; right lung; tibial nerve; apex of heart; left uterine tube / Top expressed in: granulocyte; stroma of bone marrow; mesenteric lymph nodes; tibiofemoral joint; decidua; spleen; white adipose tissue; subcutaneous adipose tissue; blood; ankle; More reference expression data
BioGPS	More reference expression data
Gene ontology
Molecular function	identical protein binding; enzyme binding; endopeptidase activator activity
Cellular component	integral component of membrane; membrane; plasma membrane
Biological process	positive regulation of gene expression; positive regulation of endopeptidase activity; positive regulation of cell migration; zymogen activation; negative regulation of interferon-gamma production; negative regulation of interleukin-10 production; negative regulation of interleukin-17 production; negative regulation of tumor necrosis factor production; positive regulation of regulatory T cell differentiation; positive regulation of collagen catabolic process; negative regulation of CD4-positive, alpha-beta T cell proliferation; negative regulation of CD8-positive, alpha-beta T cell proliferation
Sources:Amigo / QuickGO
Orthologs
Databases	NCBI: entry; OMA: entry
Species	Human	Mouse
Entrez	64115	74048
Ensembl	ENSG00000107738	ENSMUSG00000020101
UniProt	Q9H7M9	Q9D659
RefSeq (mRNA)	NM_022153	NM_001159572; NM_028732
RefSeq (protein)	NP_071436	NP_001153044; NP_083008
Location (UCSC)	Chr 10: 71.75 – 71.77 Mb	Chr 10: 60.18 – 60.21 Mb
PubMed search
- Wikidata
View/Edit Human	View/Edit Mouse

V-set immunoregulatory receptor (VSIR) also called V-domain Ig suppressor of T cell activation (VISTA) is a protein that in humans is encoded by the gene VSIR. It is a type I transmembrane protein that functions as an immune checkpoint.

== Structure and function ==
VISTA is approximately 50 kDa and belongs to the immunoglobulin superfamily and has one IgV domain.

VISTA is part of the B7 family, is primarily expressed in white blood cells and its transcription is partially controlled by p53. There is evidence that VISTA can act as a ligand that engages an inhibitory receptor LRIG1 on T cells and impairs T cell activation and function. Another binding partner for VISTA is PSGL-1, which binds VISTA only under acidic conditions (pH<6.5). VISTA expressed on T cells also intrinsically suppresses T cell activation, likely by engaging other inhibitory receptors on the same cell. Aside from T cells, VISTA is highly expressed on macrophages and myeloid-derived suppressor cells (MDSCs) and regulates their differentiation and function. Similarly, VISTA and TIM-3 may co-exist on macrophages infiltrating different human and mouse tumours where they can co-regulate immunotherapy resistance.

== Clinical significance ==
VISTA is expressed at high levels in tumor-infiltrating lymphocytes, such as myeloid-derived suppressor cells and regulatory T cells, and its blockade with an antibody results in delayed tumor growth in mouse models of melanoma and squamous cell carcinoma. It is also up-regulated in tumour-associated macrophages in various malignancies, including melanoma, especially in immunotherapy-resistant human context. VISTA cooperates with another immune checkpoint receptor PD-1 in modulating anti-tumor immunity and autoimmunity.

Monocytes from HIV-infected patients produce higher levels of VISTA compared to uninfected individuals. The increased VISTA levels correlated with an increase in immune activation and a decrease in CD4-positive T cells.

=== As a drug target ===
There are several ongoing cancer immunotherapy clinical trials for a monoclonal antibodies targeting VISTA in advanced cancer. Preliminary results of the phase I clinical trials show good safety tolerance and anti-cancer activity in patients with advanced tumours. One new approach uses an antibody (SNS-101) that only binds to VISTA when the multiple histidine residues of VISTA are protonated inside acid tumors. This approach improves the pharmacokinetics of the anti-VISTA antibody. Another ongoing clinical trial involves a small molecule that antagonizes the programmed death-ligands 1 and 2 (PD-L1 and PD-L2), and VISTA pathways in patients with advanced solid tumors or lymphomas.
