= Immunoglobulin domain =

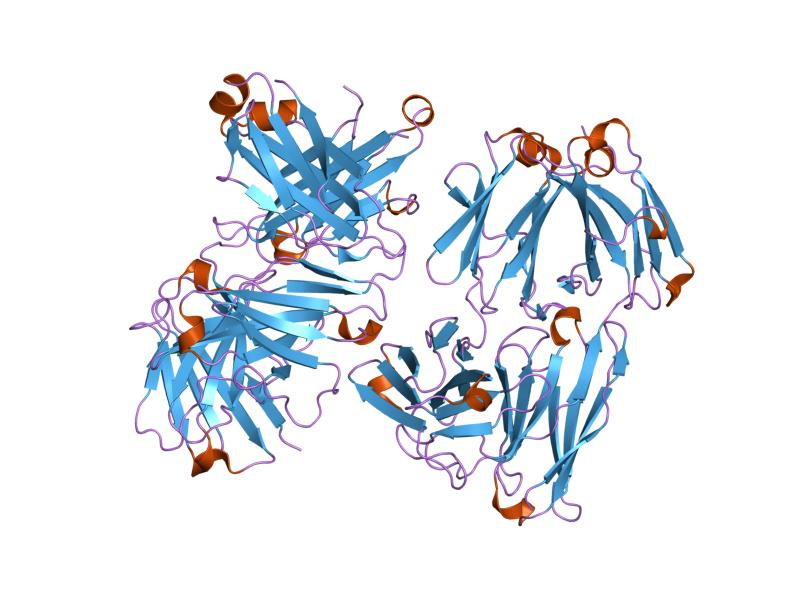
- Structure of an antigen binding fragment of an antibody.

Identifiers
- Symbol: ig
- Pfam: PF00047
- Pfam clan: CL0159
- InterPro: IPR013151
- PROSITE: PDOC00262
- SCOP2: 8fab / SCOPe / SUPFAM
- OPM superfamily: 193
- OPM protein: 5f71
- CDD: cd00096
- Membranome: 2
Available protein structures:
- PDB: IPR013151 PF00047 (ECOD; PDBsum)
- AlphaFold: IPR013151; PF00047

The immunoglobulin domain, also known as the immunoglobulin fold, is a type of protein domain that consists of a 2-layer sandwich of 7-9 antiparallel β-strands arranged in two β-sheets with a Greek key topology, consisting of 70-125 amino acids.

The backbone switches repeatedly between the two β-sheets. Typically, the pattern is (N-terminal β-hairpin in sheet 1)-(β-hairpin in sheet 2)-(β-strand in sheet 1)-(C-terminal β-hairpin in sheet 2). The cross-overs between sheets form an "X", so that the N- and C-terminal hairpins are facing each other. Every other residue in the β-strands that faces the interface between the two sheets is hydrophobic. Hydrophobic interactions at this interface, together with the highly conserved disulfide bond linking the cysteine residues on the B and F strands, stabilize the Ig domain.

There are several types of immunoglobulin domains; the most common are constant (IgC), intermediate and variable, IgV. The difference in the structure is shown in the schematic figure below. The constant IgC domain consists of seven β-strands. The loops connecting the β-strands in IgC are short, meaning most amino acid residues are part of the β-strands. The IgC domains are further divided into two subclasses: IgC1 (typical constant domain) and IgC2 (less common). The IgC1 β-sandwich consists of two sheets: the first sheet is formed by strands A, B, E, and D and the second sheet is formed by strands G, F, and C. In contrast, IgC2 lacks strand D but includes an additional strand, C’. IgC2 is found in T-cell surface antigens (CD2, CD4, CD80) and cell adhesion molecules (VCAM, ICAM). The loops connecting the β-strands in IgC are short, meaning most amino acids are part of the β-strands.

Variable immunoglobulin IgV domain consists of two β-sheets formed by strands ABDE and GFCC′C″. IgV domains are essential components of antibodies and T-cell receptors because they contain the antigen-binding sites, known as complementarity-determining regions (CDRs). The CDRs are formed by three variable loops, which are generally longer than the corresponding loops in IgC domains. Specifically, the loop between strands B and C constitutes CDR1, the loop between strands C′ and C″ forms CDR2, and the loop between strands F and G forms CDR3. Together, these loops mediate antigen recognition and binding by antibodies and T-cell receptors.

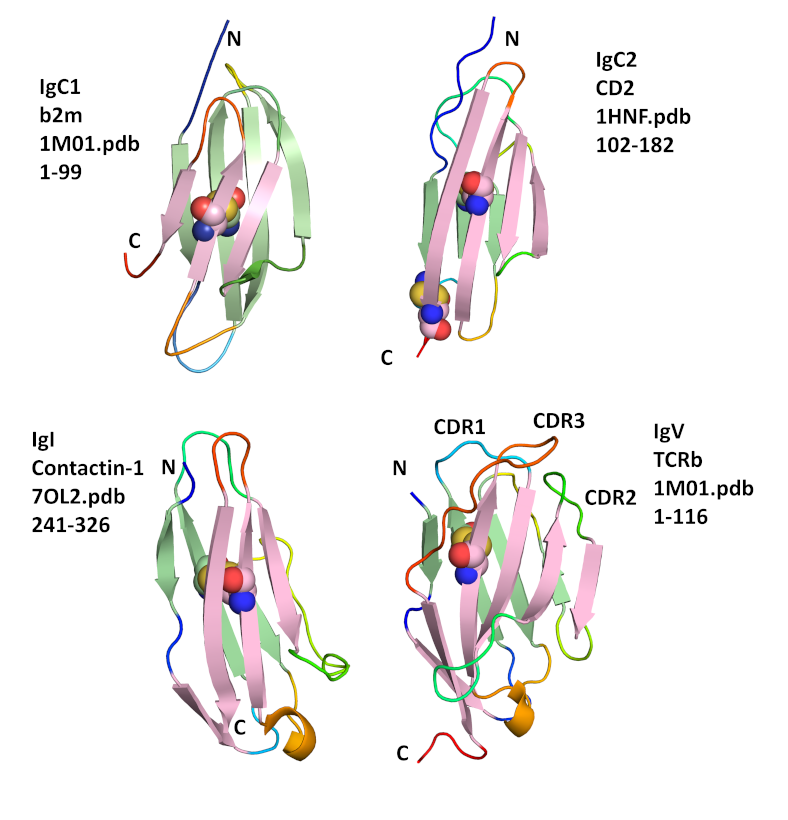
Examples of three-dimensional structures of different types of immunoglubulin fold. Conserved cysteine residues forming disulfide bond are shown as spheres

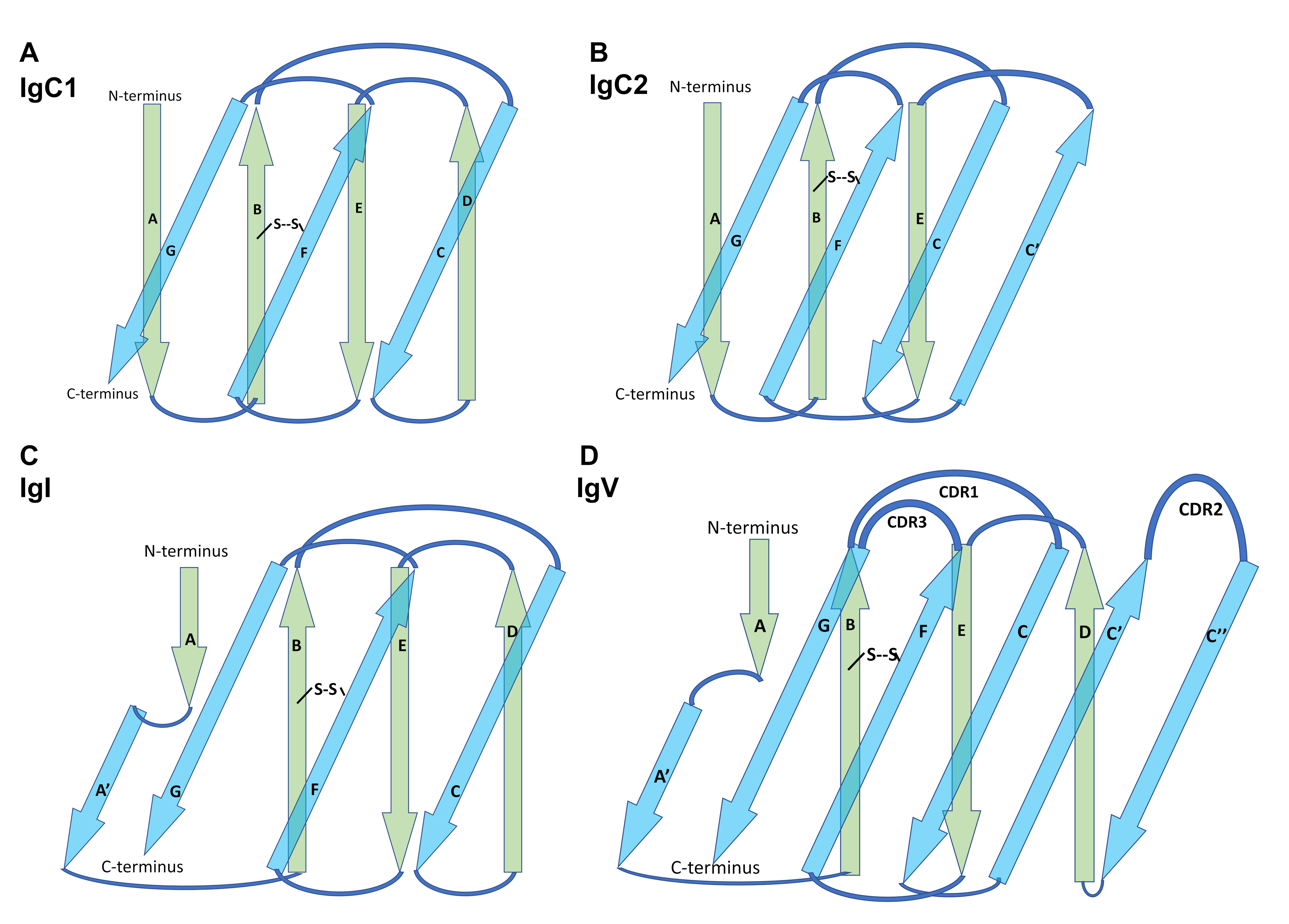
Comparison of the β-sandwich architecture of different Ig domains

The immunoglobulin domain is found in numerous proteins of the immunoglobulin superfamily (IgSF), where it mediates molecular recognition, protein–protein interactions, and cell adhesion. Genome-wide analyses have identified the Ig domain as one of the most abundant protein structural motifs in humans. In addition to immunoglobulins (antibodies), the IgSF comprises more than 750 proteins, including major histocompatibility complex (MHC) molecules, T-cell receptors (TCRs), the co-receptors CD3, CD4, and CD8, cytokine and growth factor receptors, natural killer (NK) cell receptors, and numerous other regulators of immune responses. Although the majority of IgSF proteins are membrane-bound, some are soluble and function either within the cytoplasm or in the extracellular space.

Protein chains may contain only a single immunoglobulin domain, as in β₂-microglobulin; they may contain one Ig domain together with several other domains, as in major histocompatibility complex (MHC) proteins; or they may consist of multiple Ig domains, as in antibodies, where each chain forms an N-terminal variable domain and two constant Ig domains (IgC1). The largest known human protein, titin (34,350 amino acids), contains 152 Ig domains in addition to hundreds of domains with other structural folds.

Members of the immunoglobulin superfamily are found in hundreds of proteins of different functions. Examples include antibodies, the giant muscle kinase titin, and receptor tyrosine kinases. Immunoglobulin-like domains may be involved in protein–protein and protein–ligand interactions.

== Examples ==
Human genes encoding proteins containing the immunoglobulin domain include:

- A1BG
- ACAM
- ADAMTSL1
- ADAMTSL3
- AGER
- ALCAM
- AMIGO1
- AMIGO2
- AXL
- BCAM
- BOC
- BSG
- BTLA
- C10orf72
- C20orf102
- CADM1
- CADM3
- CD200
- CD22
- CD276
- CD33
- CD4
- CDON
- CEACAM1
- CEACAM16
- CEACAM20
- CEACAM21
- CEACAM5
- CEACAM6
- CEACAM8
- CHL1
- CILP
- CNTFR
- CNTN1
- CNTN2
- CNTN3
- CNTN4
- CNTN5
- CNTN6
- CSF1R
- DSCAM
- DSCAML1
- EMB
- F11R
- FAIM3
- FCAR
- FCER1A
- FCGR1A
- FCGR2A
- FCGR2B
- FCGR2C
- FCGR3A
- FCGR3B
- FCRH1
- FCRH3
- FCRH4
- FCRL1
- FCRL2
- FCRL3
- FCRL4
- FCRL5
- FCRL6
- FCRLA
- FGFR1
- FGFR2
- FGFR3
- FGFR4
- FGFRL1
- FLT1
- FLT3
- FLT4
- FSTL4
- FSTL5
- GP6
- GPA33
- GPR116
- GPR125
- HEPACAM
- HLA-DMA
- HLA-DMB
- HLA-DQB
- HLA-DQB1
- HMCN1
- HNT
- HSPG2
- HYST2477
- ICAM3
- ICAM5
- IGHA1
- IGHD
- IGHE
- IGSF10
- IGSF11
- IGSF2
- IGSF21
- IGSF3
- IGSF9
- IL11RA
- IL1R1
- IL1R2
- IL1RAPL1
- IL1RAPL2
- IL1RL1
- IL1RL2
- IL6R
- JAM2
- JAM3
- KIR-123FM
- KIR2DL1
- KIR2DL2
- KIR2DL3
- KIR2DL4
- KIR2DL5A
- KIR2DL5B
- KIR2DLX
- KIR2DS1
- KIR2DS2
- KIR2DS3
- KIR2DS4
- KIR2DS5
- KIR3DL1
- KIR3DL2
- KIR3DL3
- KIR3DS1
- KIT
- L1CAM
- LAG3
- LILRA1
- LILRA2
- LILRA3
- LILRA4
- LILRA5
- LILRA6
- LILRB1
- LILRB2
- LILRB3
- LILRB4
- LILRB5
- LILRP2
- LRIG1
- LRIG2
- LRIG3
- LRIT1
- LRRC4
- LSAMP
- MAG
- MALT1
- MCAM
- MDGA1
- MDGA2
- MERTK
- MFAP3
- MIR
- MIR
- MXRA5
- MYBPC3
- MYOM1
- MYOM3
- NCA
- NCAM1
- NCAM2
- NEGR1
- NEO1
- NFASC
- NOPE
- NPHS1
- NPTN
- NRCAM
- NRG1
- NT
- NTRK3
- OBSCN
- OBSL1
- OPCML
- PAPLN
- PDGFRA
- PDGFRB
- PDGFRL
- PECAM1
- PRODH2
- PSG1
- PSG10
- PSG11
- PSG11s'
- PSG2
- PSG3
- PSG4
- PSG5
- PSG6
- PSG7
- PSG8
- PSG9
- PTGFRN
- PTK7
- PTPRD
- PTPRK
- PTPRM
- PTPRS
- PTPsigma
- PUNC
- PVR
- PVRL1
- PVRL2
- PVRL4
- RAGE
- SCN1B
- SDK1
- SDK2
- SEMA3A
- SEMA3B
- SEMA3E
- SEMA3F
- SEMA3G
- SEMA4D
- SIGLEC1
- SIGLEC10
- SIGLEC11
- SIGLEC12
- SIGLEC14
- SIGLEC6
- SIGLEC7
- SIGLEC8
- SIRPG
- THY1
- TIE1
- TMIGD1
- TMIGD2
- TTN
- TYRO3
- UNC5D
- VCAM1
- VSIG1
- VSIG2
- VSIG4
- hEMMPRIN
- kir3d

== See also ==
- Immunoglobulin superfamily
