= CD64 =

Integral membrane glycoprotein

Fc fragment of IgG, high affinity Ia, receptor (CD64)

Identifiers
- Symbol: FCGR1A
- NCBI gene: 2209
- HGNC: 3613
- OMIM: 146760
- RefSeq: NM_000566
- UniProt: P12314

Other data
- Locus: Chr. 1 q21.2-21.3
Search for
- Structures: Swiss-model
- Domains: InterPro

Fc fragment of IgG, high affinity Ib, receptor (CD64)

Identifiers
- Symbol: FCGR1B
- NCBI gene: 2210
- HGNC: 3614
- OMIM: 601502
- RefSeq: NM_001004340
- UniProt: Q92637

Other data
- Locus: Chr. 1 p11.2
Search for
- Structures: Swiss-model
- Domains: InterPro

Fc fragment of IgG, high affinity Ic, receptor (CD64)

Identifiers
- Symbol: FCGR1C
- NCBI gene: 2211
- HGNC: 3615
- OMIM: 601503
- RefSeq: XM_001133198

Other data
- Locus: Chr. 1 q21.1

CD64 (Cluster of Differentiation 64) is a type of integral membrane glycoprotein known as an Fc receptor that binds monomeric IgG-type antibodies with high affinity. It is more commonly known as Fc-gamma receptor 1 (FcγRI). After binding IgG, CD64 interacts with an accessory chain known as the common γ chain (γ chain), which possesses an ITAM motif that is necessary for triggering cellular activation.

Structurally CD64 is composed of a signal peptide that allows its transport to the surface of a cell, three extracellular immunoglobulin domains of the C2-type that it uses to bind antibody, a hydrophobic transmembrane domain, and a short cytoplasmic tail.

CD64 is constitutively found on only macrophages and monocytes, but treatment of polymorphonuclear leukocytes with cytokines like IFNγ and G-CSF can induce CD64 expression on these cells.

There are three distinct (but highly similar) genes in humans for CD64 called FcγRIA (CD64A), FcγRIB (CD64B), and FcγRIC (CD64C) that are located on chromosome 1. These three genes produce six different mRNA transcripts; two from CD64A, three from CD64B, and one from CD64C; by alternate splicing.
