= CD16 =

Group of proteins

Fc fragment of IgG, low affinity IIIa, receptor (CD16a)

Identifiers
- Symbol: FCGR3A
- Alt. symbols: FCGR3, FCG3
- NCBI gene: 2214
- HGNC: 3619
- OMIM: 146740
- RefSeq: NM_000569
- UniProt: P08637

Other data
- Locus: Chr. 1 q23
Search for
- Structures: Swiss-model
- Domains: InterPro

Fc fragment of IgG, low affinity IIIb, receptor (CD16b)

Identifiers
- Symbol: FCGR3B
- Alt. symbols: FCGR3, FCG3
- NCBI gene: 2215
- HGNC: 3620
- OMIM: 610665
- RefSeq: NM_000570
- UniProt: O75015

Other data
- Locus: Chr. 1 q23
Search for
- Structures: Swiss-model
- Domains: InterPro

CD16, also known as FcγRIII, is a cluster of differentiation molecule found on the surface of natural killer cells, neutrophils, monocytes, macrophages, and certain T cells. CD16 has been identified as Fc receptors FcγRIIIa (CD16a) and FcγRIIIb (CD16b), which participate in signal transduction. The most well-researched membrane receptor implicated in triggering lysis by NK cells, CD16 is a molecule of the immunoglobulin superfamily (IgSF) involved in antibody-dependent cellular cytotoxicity (ADCC). It can be used to isolate populations of specific immune cells through fluorescent-activated cell sorting (FACS) or magnetic-activated cell sorting, using antibodies directed towards CD16.

== Function ==
CD16 is the type III Fcγ receptor. In humans, it exists in two different forms: FcγRIIIa (CD16a) and FcγRIIIb (CD16b), which have 96% sequence similarity in the extracellular immunoglobulin binding regions. While FcγRIIIa is expressed on mast cells, macrophages, and natural killer cells as a transmembrane receptor, FcγRIIIb is only expressed on neutrophils. In addition, FcγRIIIb is the only Fc receptor anchored to the cell membrane by a glycosyl-phosphatidylinositol (GPI) linker, and also plays a significant role in triggering calcium mobilization and neutrophil degranulation. FcγRIIIa and FcγRIIIb together are able to activate degranulation, phagocytosis, and oxidative burst, which allows neutrophils to clear opsonized pathogens.

== Mechanism and regulation ==
These receptors bind to the Fc portion of IgG antibodies, which then activates antibody-dependent cell-mediated cytotoxicity (ADCC) in human NK cells. CD16 is required for ADCC processes carried out by human monocytes. In humans, monocytes expressing CD16 have a variety of ADCC capabilities in the presence of specific antibodies, and can kill primary leukemic cells, cancer cell lines, and cells infected with hepatitis B virus. In addition, CD16 is able to mediate the direct killing of some virally infected and cancer cells without antibodies.

After binding to ligands such as the conserved section of IgG antibodies, CD16 on human NK cells induce gene transcription of surface activation molecules such as IL-2-R (CD25) and inflammatory cytokines such as IFN-gamma and TNF. This CD16-induced expression of cytokine mRNA in NK cells is mediated by the nuclear factor of activated T cells (NFATp), a cyclosporin A (CsA)-sensitive factor that regulates the transcription of various cytokines. The upregulated expression of specific cytokine genes occurs via a CsA-sensitive and calcium-dependent mechanism.

== Structure ==
The crystal structures of FcεRIα, FcγRIIa, FcγRIIb and FcγRIII have been experimentally determined. These structures revealed a conserved immunoglobulin-like (Ig-like) structure. In addition, the structures demonstrated a common feature in all known Ig superfamily Fc receptors: the acute hinge angle between the N- and C-terminal Ig domains. Specifically, the structure of CD16 (FcγRIIIb) consists of two immunoglobulin-like domains, with an interdomain hinge angle of around 50°. The receptor's Fc binding region also carries a net positive charge, which complements the negatively-charged receptor binding regions on Fc.

== Clinical significance ==
CD16 plays a significant role in early activation of natural killer (NK) cells following vaccination. In addition, CD16 downregulation represents a possible way to moderate NK cell responses and maintain immune homeostasis in both T cell and antibody-dependent signaling pathways. In a normal, healthy individual, cross-linking of CD16 (FcγRIII) by immune complexes induces antibody-dependent cellular cytotoxicity (ADCC) in NK cells. However, this pathway can also be targeted in cancerous or diseased cells by immunotherapy. After influenza vaccination, CD16 downregulation was associated with significant upregulation of influenza-specific plasma antibodies, and positively correlated with degranulation of NK cells.

CD38 on leukocytes attaching to CD16 on endothelial cells allows for leukocyte binding to blood vessel walls, and the passage of leukocytes through blood vessel walls.

CD16 is often used as an additional marker to reliably identify different subsets of human immune cells. Several other CD molecules, such as CD11b and CD33, are traditionally used as markers for human myeloid-derived suppressor cells (MDSCs). However, since these markers are also expressed on NK cells and all other cells derived from myelocytes, other markers are required, such as CD14 and CD15. Neutrophils are found to be CD14low and CD15high, whereas monocytes are CD14high and CD15low. While these two markers are sufficient to differentiate between neutrophils and monocytes, eosinophils have a similar CD15 expression to neutrophils. Therefore, CD16 is used as a further marker to identify neutrophils: mature neutrophils are CD16high, while eosinophils and monocytes are both CD16low. CD16 allows for distinction between these two types of granulocytes. Additionally, CD16 expression varies between the different stages of neutrophil development: neutrophil progenitors that have differentiation capacity are CD16low, with increasing expression of CD16 in metamyelocytes, banded, and mature neutrophils, respectively.

CD16-positive T cells have been found in patients with chronic viral infections or after organ transplantation as well as in patients with severe COVID-19. CD16 expression enables antibody-mediated degranulation and thus allows T cell receptor-independent cytotoxicity. In patients with severe COVID-19, CD16-positive T cells may lead to exacerbated cytotoxicity, promote microvascular endothelial cell injury and contribute to disease severity.

== As a drug target ==
With its expression on neutrophils, CD16 represents a possible target in cancer immunotherapy. Margetuximab, an Fc-optimized monoclonal antibody that recognizes the human epidermal growth factor receptor 2 (HER2) expressed on tumor cells in breast, bladder, and other solid tumor cancers, targets CD16A in preference to CD16B. In addition, CD16 could play a role in antibody-targeting cancer therapies. FcγRIV, a murine homologue of CD16A has been shown to be involved in antibody-mediated depletion of tumor-infiltrating regulatory T cells in monoclonal antibody mediated immunotherapy. Bispecific antibody fragments, such as anti-CD19/CD16, allow the targeting of immunotherapeutic drugs to the cancer cell. Anti-CD19/CD16 diabodies have been shown to enhance the natural killer cell response to B-cell lymphomas. Furthermore, targeting extrinsic factors such as FasL or TRAIL to the tumor cell surface triggers death receptors, inducing apoptosis by both autocrine and paracrine processes.
