= Nader Rahimi =

Molecular biologist

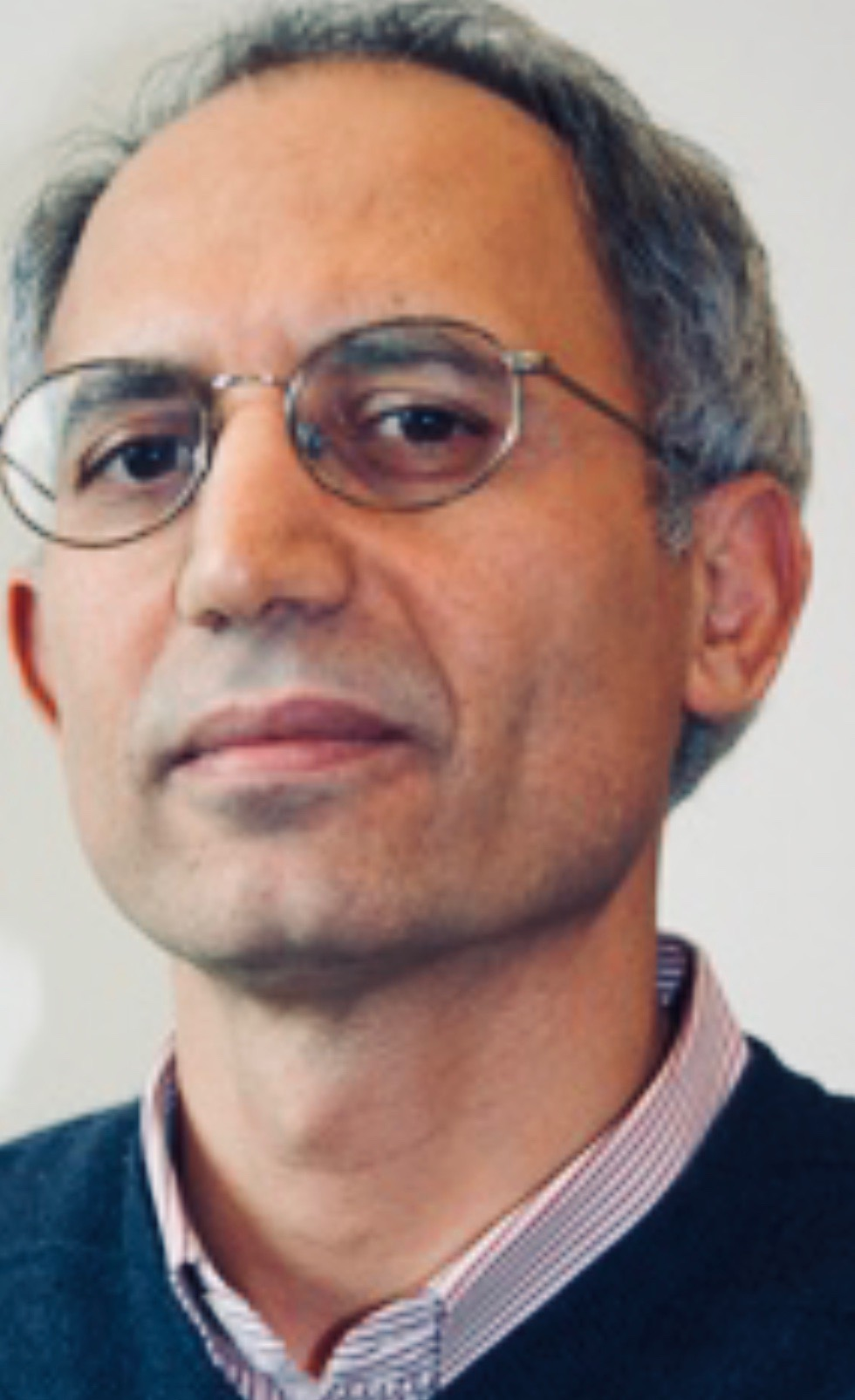
- Born: December 22, 1963 (age 62)
- Education: University of Toronto (BS); Queen's University (PhD)
- Scientific career
- Fields: Molecular Biology, Receptor tyrosine kinases, posttranslational modification, Signal transduction
- Workplaces: Boston University

Nader Rahimi (born December 22, 1963) is a molecular biologist and is currently an associate professor at the Department of Pathology and Laboratory Medicine at Boston University.

== Education ==
Nader Rahimi received his Bachelor of Science degree in Biochemistry from the University of Toronto in 1991 and received his Ph.D. from Queen's University, Kingston, Canada in 1996. He completed his postdoctoral fellowship at Harvard Medical School in the fields of signal transduction and angiogenesis.

== Career ==
Nader Rahimi has extensively published in the field of signal transduction by receptor tyrosine kinases in particular VEGF receptor tyrosine kinases. His notable works include demonstration of differential function of VEGFR-1 and VEGFR-2 in angiogenesis, identification of lysine methylation as a novel mechanism of activation of VEGFR-2, establishing protein ubiquitination as a major pathway modulating the angiogenic signaling of VEGFR-2. He is also responsible for the discovery of multiple cell surface receptors including, IGPR-1 (TMIGD2), TMIGD1, MINAR1, and MINAR2. His work on COVID-19 resulted in the discovery of CD209L and CD209 as novel receptors and vimentin as an attachment factor for SARS-CoV-2.
