= Cd101 =

CD101 or Cd101 may refer to:

- IGSF2, a human gene
- The former branding of American radio station WOSA
- Cadmium-101 (Cd-101 or ^{101}Cd), an isotope of cadmium

== See also ==
- CD101.9, a former jazz station in New York City
