= Ciliary neurotrophic factor =

Protein found in humans

CNTF
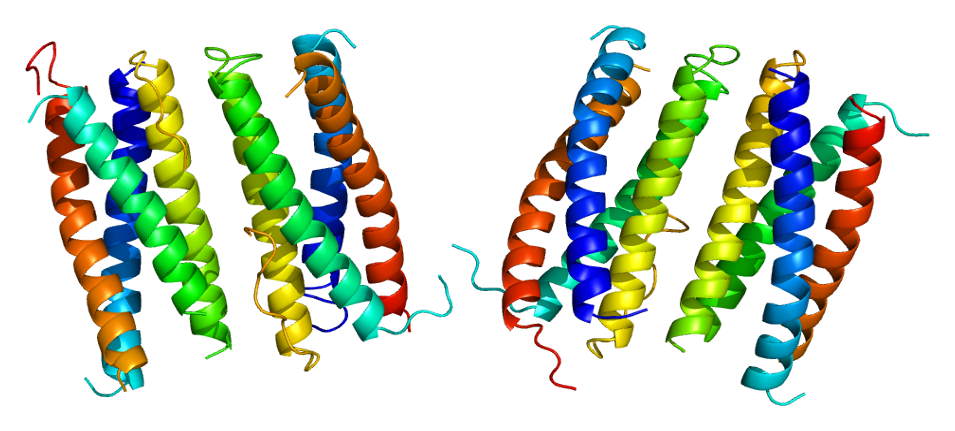

Identifiers
- Aliases: CNTF, Hciliary neurotrophic factor
- External IDs: OMIM: 118945; MGI: 88439; GeneCards: CNTF
Available structures
PDB	Ortholog search: PDBe RCSB
PDB	List of PDB id codes 1CNT

Gene location (Human)
Chr.	Chromosome 11 (human)
Band	11q12.1	Start	58,622,665 bp
Band	11q12.1	End	58,625,733 bp

Gene location (Mouse)
Chr.	Chromosome 19 (mouse)
Band	19 A|19 8.73 cM	Start	12,741,024 bp
Band	19 A|19 8.73 cM	End	12,742,996 bp
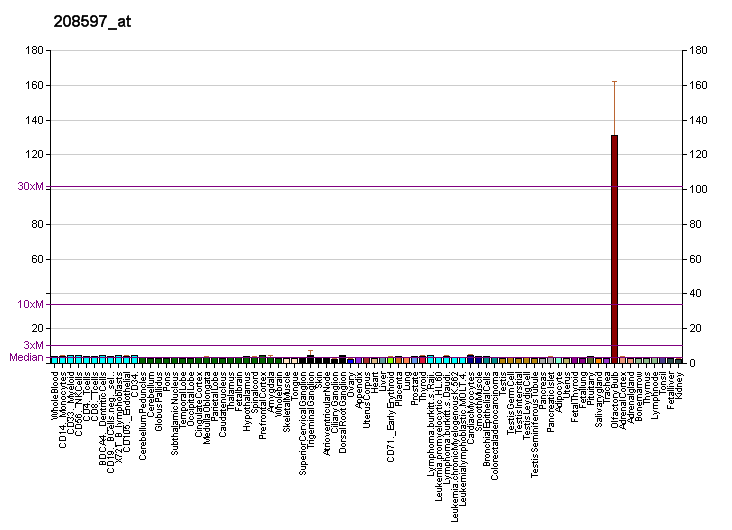
RNA expression pattern
Bgee	Human / Mouse (ortholog); Top expressed in: testicle; tibial nerve; C1 segment; sural nerve; gastrocnemius muscle; substantia nigra; monocyte; muscle of thigh; olfactory zone of nasal mucosa; bone marrow / Top expressed in: lens; morula; embryo; tail of embryo; blastocyst; salivary gland; hair; embryo; pallidum of neuraxis; muscle of thigh; More reference expression data
BioGPS	More reference expression data
Gene ontology
Molecular function	interleukin-6 receptor binding; protein binding; ciliary neurotrophic factor receptor binding; growth factor activity; cytokine activity; protein-containing complex binding
Cellular component	cytoplasm; CRLF-CLCF1 complex; extracellular region; axon; extracellular space
Biological process	negative regulation of neuron apoptotic process; cell differentiation; muscle organ morphogenesis; neuron development; regulation of retinal cell programmed cell death; nervous system development; ciliary neurotrophic factor-mediated signaling pathway; multicellular organism development; negative regulation of photoreceptor cell differentiation; positive regulation of gene expression; signal transduction; positive regulation of axon regeneration; positive regulation of cell population proliferation; astrocyte activation; positive regulation of tyrosine phosphorylation of STAT protein; growth; regulation of signaling receptor activity; cytokine-mediated signaling pathway
Sources:Amigo / QuickGO
Orthologs
Databases	NCBI: entry; OMA: entry
Species	Human	Mouse
Entrez	1270	12803
Ensembl	ENSG00000242689	ENSMUSG00000079415
UniProt	P26441	P51642
RefSeq (mRNA)	NM_000614	NM_053007; NM_170786
RefSeq (protein)	NP_000605	NP_740756
Location (UCSC)	Chr 11: 58.62 – 58.63 Mb	Chr 19: 12.74 – 12.74 Mb
PubMed search
- Wikidata
View/Edit Human	View/Edit Mouse

Ciliary neurotrophic factor is a protein that in humans is encoded by the CNTF gene.

The protein encoded by this gene is a polypeptide hormone and neurotrophic factor whose actions have mainly been studied in the nervous system where it promotes neurotransmitter synthesis and neurite outgrowth in certain neural populations including astrocytes. It is a hypothalamic neuropeptide that is a potent survival factor for neurons and oligodendrocytes and may be relevant in reducing tissue destruction during inflammatory attacks. A mutation in this gene, which results in aberrant splicing, leads to ciliary neurotrophic factor deficiency, but this phenotype is not causally related to neurologic disease. In addition to the predominant monocistronic transcript originating from this locus, the gene is also cotranscribed with the upstream ZFP91 gene. Cotranscription from the two loci results in a transcript that contains a complete coding region for the zinc finger protein but lacks a complete coding region for ciliary neurotrophic factor.

CNTF has also been shown to be expressed by cells on the bone surface, and to reduce the activity of bone-forming cells (osteoblasts).

== Therapeutic applications ==
=== Satiety effects ===
In 2001, it was reported that in a human study examining the usefulness of CNTF for treatment of motor neuron disease, CNTF produced an unexpected and substantial weight loss in the study subjects. Further investigation revealed that CNTF could reduce food intake without causing hunger or stress, making it a candidate for weight control in leptin-resistant subjects, as CNTF is believed to operate like leptin, but by a non-leptin pathway.

=== Recombinant human CNTF (Axokine) ===
A recombinant version of human CNTF (rhCNTF), trade name Axokine, is a modified version with a 15 amino acid truncation of the C-terminus and two amino acid substitutions. It is three to five times more potent than CNTF in in vitro and in vivo assays and has improved stability properties. Like CNTF it is a neurotrophic factor, and may stimulate nerve cells to survive. It was tested in the 1990s as a treatment for amyotrophic lateral sclerosis. It did not improve muscle control as much as expected, but trial participants did report a loss of appetite.

Phase III clinical trials for the drug against obesity were conducted in 2003 by Axokine's maker, Regeneron Pharmaceuticals, demonstrating a small positive effect in some patients, but the drug was not commercialized. A major problem with the treatment was that in nearly 70% of the subjects tested, antibodies against Axokine were produced after approximately three months of treatment. In the minority of subjects who did not develop the antibodies, weight loss averaged 12.5 pounds in one year, versus 4.5 pounds for placebo-treated subjects. In order to obtain this benefit, subjects needed to receive daily subcutaneous injections of one microgram Axokine per kilogram body weight.

Xencor patent application raises the disturbing idea that subjects producing antibodies against CNTF analogues may eventually suffer severe adverse effects, as these antibodies could potentially interfere with the neuroprotective functions of endogenous CNTF. The application claims methods of designing CNTF analogues with lower immunogenicity than Axokine based on analysis of affinity of each modified epitope for each of 52 class II MHC alleles, and provides specific examples of such modifications. No such analogues are currently listed in Xencor's product pipeline.

=== NT-501 ===
NT-501 is a product being developed by Neurotech that consists of encapsulated human cells genetically modified to secrete ciliary neurotrophic factor (CNTF). In a clinical trial, NT-501 demonstrated a statistically significant reduction of photoreceptor degradation in patients with retinitis pigmentosa.

== Interactions ==
Human ciliary neurotrophic factor has been shown to interact with the Interleukin 6 receptor.

== See also ==
- Ciliary neurotrophic factor receptor
- Interleukin 6
- George Yancopoulos
- Peptide 021
