= IL1RAPL1 =

Protein-coding gene in the species Homo sapiens

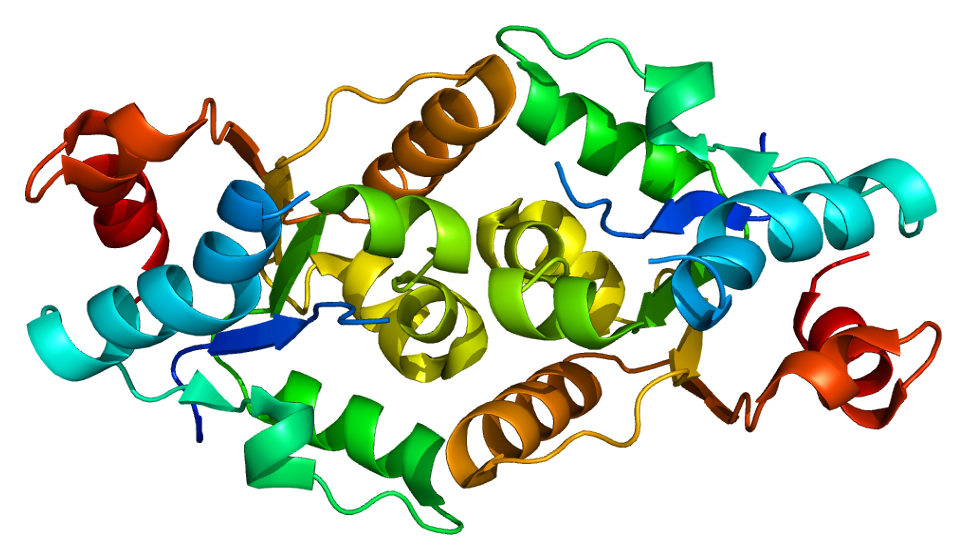

Identifiers
- Aliases: IL1RAPL1, IL1R8, IL1RAPL, MRX10, MRX21, MRX34, OPHN4, TIGIRR-2, interleukin 1 receptor accessory protein like 1, IL-1RAPL-1, IL-1-RAPL-1, IL1RAPL-1
- External IDs: OMIM: 300206; MGI: 2687319; GeneCards: IL1RAPL1
Available structures
PDB	Ortholog search: PDBe RCSB
PDB	List of PDB id codes 1T3G, 4M92
Enzyme activity
EC #	BRENDA	ExPASy	KEGG	MetaCyc
3.2.2.6	↗	↗	↗	↗

Gene location (Human)
Chr.	X chromosome (human)
Band	Xp21.3-p21.2	Start	28,587,446 bp
Band	Xp21.3-p21.2	End	29,956,718 bp

Gene location (Mouse)
Chr.	X chromosome (mouse)
Band	X|X C1	Start	85,784,476 bp
Band	X|X C1	End	87,159,251 bp
RNA expression pattern
Bgee	Human / Mouse (ortholog); Top expressed in: buccal mucosa cell; endothelial cell; corpus callosum; middle temporal gyrus; secondary oocyte; dorsal motor nucleus of vagus nerve; inferior olivary nucleus; Brodmann area 23; entorhinal cortex; postcentral gyrus / Top expressed in: piriform cortex; dentate gyrus of hippocampal formation granule cell; superior frontal gyrus; temporal lobe; primary visual cortex; prefrontal cortex; lumbar subsegment of spinal cord; Rostral migratory stream; dorsal striatum; facial motor nucleus; More reference expression data
BioGPS	n/a
Gene ontology
Molecular function	voltage-gated calcium channel activity; signaling receptor binding; protein binding; interleukin-1 binding
Cellular component	cytoplasm; integral component of membrane; cell surface; axon; postsynaptic membrane; dendrite; cell projection; membrane; plasma membrane; glutamatergic synapse
Biological process	negative regulation of exocytosis; heterophilic cell-cell adhesion via plasma membrane cell adhesion molecules; positive regulation of dendrite morphogenesis; regulation of neuron projection development; neuron differentiation; signal transduction; presynaptic membrane assembly; calcium ion transmembrane transport; positive regulation of synapse assembly; cellular response to cytokine stimulus; regulation of postsynapse organization; trans-synaptic signaling by trans-synaptic complex; regulation of presynapse assembly
Sources:Amigo / QuickGO
Orthologs
Databases	NCBI: entry; OMA: entry
Species	Human	Mouse
Entrez	11141	331461
Ensembl	ENSG00000169306	ENSMUSG00000052372
UniProt	Q9NZN1	P59823
RefSeq (mRNA)	NM_014271	NM_001160403
RefSeq (protein)	NP_055086	n/a
Location (UCSC)	Chr X: 28.59 – 29.96 Mb	Chr X: 85.78 – 87.16 Mb
PubMed search
- Wikidata
View/Edit Human	View/Edit Mouse

X-linked interleukin-1 receptor accessory protein-like 1, also known as IL-1R8, is a protein that in humans is encoded by the IL1RAPL1 gene. IL1RAPL1 is composed of 11 exons, about 1.37 Mb total.

== Function ==
The protein encoded by this gene, IL-1R8, is a member of the interleukin-1 receptor family and is similar to the interleukin 1 accessory proteins. It is most closely related to interleukin 1 receptor accessory protein-like 2 (IL1RAPL2).

== Clinical significance ==
This gene and IL1RAPL2 are located at a region on chromosome X that is associated with X-linked non-syndromic intellectual disability. Deletions and mutations in this gene were found in patients with intellectual disability. This gene is expressed at a high level in post-natal brain structures involved in the hippocampal memory system, which suggests a specialized role in the physiological processes underlying memory and learning abilities.
