= Fc receptor =

Surface protein important to the immune system

Immunoglobulin-like receptor
- Schematic diagram showing Fc receptor interaction with an antibody-coated microbial pathogen

Identifiers
- Symbol: Fc receptor
- Membranome: 10

In immunology, an Fc receptor is a protein found on the surface of certain cells – including, among others, B lymphocytes, follicular dendritic cells, natural killer cells, macrophages, neutrophils, eosinophils, basophils, human platelets, and mast cells – that contribute to the protective functions of the immune system. Its name is derived from its binding specificity for a part of an antibody known as the Fc (fragment crystallizable) region. Fc receptors bind to antibodies that are attached to infected cells or invading pathogens. Their activity stimulates phagocytic or cytotoxic cells to destroy microbes, or infected cells by antibody-mediated phagocytosis or antibody-dependent cell-mediated cytotoxicity. Some viruses such as flaviviruses use Fc receptors to help them infect cells, by a mechanism known as antibody-dependent enhancement of infection.

== Classes ==
There are several different types of Fc receptors (abbreviated FcR), which are classified based on the type of antibody that they recognize. The Latin letter used to identify a type of antibody is converted into the corresponding Greek letter, which is placed after the 'Fc' part of the name. For example, those that bind the most common class of antibody, IgG, are called Fc-gamma receptors (FcγR), those that bind IgA are called Fc-alpha receptors (FcαR) and those that bind IgE are called Fc-epsilon receptors (FcεR). The classes of FcRs are also distinguished by the cells that express them (macrophages, granulocytes, natural killer cells, T and B cells) and the signalling properties of each receptor.

=== Fc-gamma receptors ===
All of the Fcγ receptors (FcγR) belong to the immunoglobulin superfamily and are the most important Fc receptors for inducing phagocytosis of opsonized (marked) microbes. This family includes several members, FcγRI (CD64), FcγRIIA (CD32), FcγRIIB (CD32), FcγRIIIA (CD16a), FcγRIIIB (CD16b), which differ in their antibody affinities due to their different molecular structure. For instance, FcγRI binds to IgG more strongly than FcγRII or FcγRIII does. FcγRI also has an extracellular portion composed of three immunoglobulin (Ig)-like domains, one more domain than FcγRII or FcγRIII has. This property allows FcγRI to bind a sole IgG molecule (or monomer), but all Fcγ receptors must bind multiple IgG molecules within an immune complex to be activated.

The Fc-gamma receptors differ in their affinity for IgG and likewise the different IgG subclasses have unique affinities for each of the Fc gamma receptors. These interactions are further tuned by the glycan (oligosaccharide) at position CH2-84.4 of IgG. For example, by creating steric hindrance, fucose containing CH2-84.4 glycans reduce IgG affinity for FcγRIIIA. In contrast, G0 glycans, which lack galactose and terminate instead with GlcNAc moieties, have increased affinity for FcγRIIIA.

=== Neonatal Fc Receptor ===
Another FcR is expressed on multiple cell types and is similar in structure to MHC class I. This receptor also binds IgG and is involved in preservation of this antibody. However, since this Fc receptor is also involved in transferring IgG from a mother either via the placenta to her fetus or in milk to her suckling infant, it is called the neonatal Fc receptor (FcRn). Recently, research suggested that this receptor plays a role in the homeostasis of IgG serum levels.

=== Fc-alpha receptors ===
Only one Fc receptor belongs to the FcαR subgroup, which is called FcαRI (or CD89). FcαRI is found on the surface of neutrophils, eosinophils, monocytes, some macrophages (including Kupffer cells), and some dendritic cells. It is composed of two extracellular Ig-like domains, and is a member of both the immunoglobulin superfamily and the multi-chain immune recognition receptor (MIRR) family. It signals by associating with two FcRγ signaling chains. Another receptor can also bind IgA, although it has higher affinity for another antibody called IgM. This receptor is called the Fc-alpha/mu receptor (Fcα/μR) and is a type I transmembrane protein. With one Ig-like domain in its extracellular portion, this Fc receptor is also a member of the immunoglobulin superfamily.

=== Fc-epsilon receptors ===
Two types of FcεR are known:

- the high-affinity receptor FcεRI is a member of the immunoglobulin superfamily (it has two Ig-like domains). FcεRI is found on epidermal Langerhans cells, eosinophils, mast cells and basophils. As a result of its cellular distribution, this receptor plays a major role in controlling allergic responses. FcεRI is also expressed on antigen-presenting cells, and controls the production of important immune mediators called cytokines that promote inflammation.
- the low-affinity receptor FcεRII (CD23) is a C-type lectin. FcεRII has multiple functions as a membrane-bound or soluble receptor; it controls B cell growth and differentiation and blocks IgE-binding of eosinophils, monocytes, and basophils.

=== Summary table ===
Receptor name	Principal antibody ligand	Affinity for ligand	Cell distribution	Effect following binding to antibody
FcγRI (CD64)	IgG1 and IgG3	High (Kd ~ 10^{−9} M)	Macrophages; Neutrophils; Eosinophils; Dendritic cells	Phagocytosis; Cell activation Activation of respiratory burst Induction of microbe killing
FcγRIIA (CD32)	IgG	Low (Kd > 10^{−7} M)	Macrophages; Neutrophils; Eosinophils; Platelets; Langerhans cells	Phagocytosis; Degranulation (eosinophils)
FcγRIIB1 (CD32)	IgG	Low (Kd > 10^{−7} M)	B Cells; Mast cells	No phagocytosis Inhibition of cell activity
FcγRIIB2 (CD32)	IgG	Low (Kd > 10^{−7} M)	Macrophages; Neutrophils; Eosinophils	Phagocytosis; Inhibition of cell activity
FcγRIIIA (CD16a)	IgG	Low (Kd > 10^{−6} M)	NK cells Macrophages (certain tissues)	Induction of antibody-dependent cell-mediated cytotoxicity (ADCC); Induction of cytokine release by macrophages
FcγRIIIB (CD16b)	IgG	Low (Kd > 10^{−6} M)	Eosinophils; Macrophages; Neutrophils; Mast cells Follicular dendritic cells	Induction of microbe killing
FcεRI	IgE	High (Kd ~ 10^{−10} M)	Mast cells Eosinophils; Basophils; Langerhans cells Monocytes	Degranulation; Phagocytosis
FcεRII (CD23)	IgE	Low (Kd > 10^{−7} M)	B cells Eosinophils; Langerhans cells	Possible adhesion molecule IgE transport across human intestinal epithelium Positive-feedback mechanism to enhance allergic sensitization (B cells)
FcαRI (CD89)	IgA	Low (Kd > 10^{−6} M)	Monocytes; Macrophages; Neutrophils; Eosinophils	Phagocytosis; Induction of microbe killing
Fcα/μR (CD351)	IgA and IgM	High for IgM, Mid for IgA	B cells Mesangial cells Macrophages	Endocytosis; Induction of microbe killing
FcμR	IgM	(unknown)	Human FcμR is predominantly expressed by lymphocytes, but not by phagocytes	function has not been fully elucidated / diverse
FcRn	IgG	high in acidic cellular endosomes low in pH neutral extracellular environment	Monocytes; Macrophages; Dendritic cells Epithelial cells Endothelial cells Hepatocytes	Transfers IgG from a mother to fetus through the placenta Transfers IgG from a mother to infant in milk Protects IgG from degradation Transfers IgG across endothelial/epithelial layers

== Functions ==
An antibody has Fab (fragment, antigen-binding) and Fc (fragment, crystallizable) regions. Fc receptors bind to the Fc region.

Fc receptors are found on a number of cells in the immune system including phagocytes like macrophages and monocytes, granulocytes like neutrophils and eosinophils, and lymphocytes of the innate immune system (natural killer cells) or adaptive immune system (e.g., B cells). They allow these cells to bind to antibodies that are attached to the surface of microbes or microbe infected cells, helping these cells to identify and eliminate microbial pathogens. The Fc receptors bind the antibodies at their Fc region (or tail), an interaction that activates the cell that possesses the Fc receptor. Activation of phagocytes is the most common function attributed to Fc receptors. For example, macrophages begin to ingest and kill an IgG-coated pathogen by phagocytosis following engagement of their Fcγ receptors. Another process involving Fc receptors is called antibody-dependent cell-mediated cytotoxicity (ADCC). During ADCC, FcγRIII receptors on the surface of natural killer (NK) cells stimulate the NK cells to release cytotoxic molecules from their granules to kill antibody-covered target cells. FcεRI has a different function. FcεRI is the Fc receptor on granulocytes, that is involved in allergic reactions and defense against parasitic infections. When an appropriate allergic antigen or parasite is present, the cross-linking of at least two IgE molecules and their Fc receptors on the surface of a granulocyte will trigger the cell to rapidly release preformed mediators from its granules.

== Signaling mechanisms - Fc gamma receptors ==
=== Activation ===
Fc gamma receptors belong to the group of non-catalytic tyrosine-phosphorylated receptors which share a similar signalling pathway involving phosphorylation of tyrosine residues. The receptors generate signals within their cells through an important activation motif known as an immunoreceptor tyrosine-based activation motif (ITAM). An ITAM is a specific sequence of amino acids (YXXL) occurring twice in close succession in the intracellular tail of a receptor. When phosphate groups are added to the tyrosine (Y) residue of the ITAM by membrane-anchored enzymes of the Src kinase family, a signaling cascade is generated within the cell. This phosphorylation reaction typically follows interaction of an Fc receptor with its ligand. An ITAM is present in the intracellular tail of FcγRIIA, and its phosphorylation induces phagocytosis in macrophages. FcγRI and FcγRIIIA do not have an ITAM but can transmit an activating signal to their phagocytes by interacting with another protein that does. This adaptor protein is called the Fcγ subunit and, like FcγRIIA, contains the two YXXL sequences that are characteristic of an ITAM.

=== Inhibition ===
The presence of only one YXXL motif is not sufficient to activate cells, and represents a motif (I/VXXYXXL) known as an immunoreceptor tyrosine-based inhibitory motif (ITIM). FcγRIIB1 and FcγRIIB2 have an ITIM sequence and are inhibitory Fc receptors; they do not induce phagocytosis. Inhibitory actions of these receptors are controlled by enzymes that remove phosphate groups from tyrosine residues; the phosphatases SHP-1 and SHIP-1 inhibit signaling by Fcγ receptors. Binding of ligand to FcγRIIB leads to phosphorylation of the tyrosine of the ITAM motif. This modification generates the binding site for the phosphatase, a SH2 recognition domain. The abrogation of ITAM activation signaling is caused by inhibition of protein tyrosine kinases of Src family, and by hydrolyzing the membrane PIP3 interrupting the further downstream signaling by the activating receptors, such as activating FcγRs, TCR, BCR and cytokine receptors (e.g. c-Kit).

The negative signaling by FcγRIIB is mainly important for regulation of activated B cells. The positive B cell signaling is initiated by binding of foreign antigen to surface immunoglobulin. The same antigen-specific antibody is secreted and it can feedback-suppress, or promote negative signaling. This negative signaling is being provided by FcγRIIB.: Experiments using B cell deletion mutants and dominant-negative enzymes have firmly established an important role for SH2-domain-containing inositol 5-phosphatase (SHIP) in negative signaling. Negative signaling through SHIP appears to inhibit the Ras pathway through SH2 domain competition with Grb2 and Shc and may involve consumption of intracellular lipid mediators that act as allosteric enzyme activators or that promote entry of extracellular Ca2+.

== Cellular activation ==
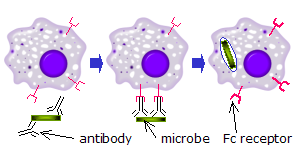
Fc receptors recognize microbes that have been bound by antibodies. The interaction between the bound antibodies and the cell surface Fc receptor activates the immune cell to kill the microbe. This example shows the phagocytosis of an opsonized microbe.

=== On phagocytes ===
When IgG molecules, specific for a certain antigen or surface component, bind to the pathogen with their Fab region (fragment antigen binding region), their Fc regions point outwards, in direct reach of phagocytes. Phagocytes bind those Fc regions with their Fc receptors. Many low affinity interactions are formed between receptor and antibody that work together to tightly bind the antibody-coated microbe. The low individual affinity prevents Fc receptors from binding antibodies in the absence of antigen, and therefore reduces the chance of immune cell activation in the absence of infection. This also prevents agglutination (clotting) of phagocytes by antibody when there is no antigen. After a pathogen has been bound, interactions between the Fc region of the antibody and the Fc receptors of the phagocyte results in the initiation of phagocytosis. The pathogen becomes engulfed by the phagocyte by an active process involving the binding and releasing of the Fc region/Fc receptor complex, until the cell membrane of the phagocyte completely encloses the pathogen.

=== On NK cells ===
The Fc receptor on NK cells recognize IgG that is bound to the surface of a pathogen-infected target cell and is called CD16 or FcγRIII. Activation of FcγRIII by IgG causes the release of cytokines such as IFN-γ that signal to other immune cells, and cytotoxic mediators like perforin and granzyme that enter the target cell and promote cell death by triggering apoptosis. This process is known as antibody-dependent cell-mediated cytotoxicity (ADCC). FcγRIII on NK cells can also associate with monomeric IgG (i.e., IgG that is not antigen-bound). When this occurs, the Fc receptor inhibits the activity of the NK cell.

=== On mast cells ===
Activation of mast cell degranulation by IgE interaction with FcεRI. 1 = antigen; 2 = IgE; 3 = FcεRI; 4 = preformed mediators (histamine, proteases, chemokines, heparin); 5 = granules; 6 – mast cell; 7 – newly formed mediators (prostaglandins, leukotrienes, thromboxanes, platelet-activating factor)

IgE antibodies bind to antigens of allergens. These allergen-bound IgE molecules interact with Fcε receptors on the surface of mast cells. Activation of mast cells following engagement of FcεRI results in a process called degranulation, whereby the mast cell releases preformed molecules from its cytoplasmic granules; these are a mixture of compounds including histamine, proteoglycans, and serine proteases. Activated mast cells also synthesize and secrete lipid-derived mediators (such as prostaglandins, leukotrienes, and platelet-activating factor) and cytokines (such as interleukin 1, interleukin 3, interleukin 4, interleukin 5, interleukin 6, interleukin 13, tumor necrosis factor-alpha, GM-CSF, and several chemokines. These mediators contribute to inflammation by attracting other leukocytes.

=== On eosinophils ===
Large parasites like the helminth (worm) Schistosoma mansoni are too large for ingestion by phagocytes. They also have an external structure called an integument that is resistant to attack by substances released by macrophages and mast cells. However, these parasites can become coated with IgE and recognized by FcεRII on the surface of eosinophils. Activated eosinophils release preformed mediators such as major basic protein, and enzymes such as peroxidase, against which helminths are not resistant. The interaction of the FcεRII receptor with the Fc portion of helminth bound IgE causes the eosinophil to release these molecules in a mechanism similar to that of the NK cell during ADCC.

=== On T lymphocytes ===
CD4+ T cells (mature T_{h} cells) provide help to B cells that produce antibodies. Several subsets of activated effector CD4+ T cells are observed in disease pathology. Earlier studies summarized by Sanders and Lynch in 1993 suggested critical roles for FcRs in CD4+ T cell mediated immune responses and proposed the formation of a joint signaling complex among FcRs and TCR on the cell surface. Chauhan and coworkers reported the colocalization of the labeled ICs with the CD3 complex on activated CD4+ T cell surface, which thus suggest the coexistence of FcRs together with TCR complex. Both of these receptors are observed forming an apical structure on the membrane of activated CD4+ T cells, suggesting the lateral movement of these receptors. Co-migration of FcRs with TCR and BCR complex is observed on the cells surface and T:B cell cytoconjugates show this coexistence at the point of contact. An earlier review suggested that the expression of FcRs on CD4+ T cells is an open question. This established the current paradigm that T cells do not express FcRs and these findings were never challenged and experimentally tested. Chauhan and coworkers showed binding of immune complexes (ICs), the FcR ligand to activated CD4+ T cells. CD16a expression is induced in the activated human naïve CD4+ T cells, which express CD25, CD69, and CD98 and ligation to ICs leads to generation of effector memory cells. CD16a signaling is mediated by phosphorylation of Syk (pSyk).

A study now suggests induced expression of CD32a upon activation of human CD4+ T cells, similar to CD16a. CD32a expression on CD4+ T cells was also suggested by three independent studies from HIV-1 researchers. The expression of CD16a and CD32a in a subset of activated CD4+ T cells is now confirmed. FcRs on the cell surface upon binding to ICs composed of nucleic acids trigger cytokine production and upregulate nucleic acid sensing pathways. FcRs are present both on the cell surface and in the cytosol. CD16a signaling upregulate the expression of nucleic acid sensing toll-like receptors and relocate them to cell surface. CD16a is a new costimulatory signal for human CD4+ T cells, which successfully substitute the CD28 requirement during autoimmunity. In an autoimmune background CD4+ T cells bypass the requirement of CD28 cosignaling to become fully activated. Furthermore, the blockade of CD28 cosignaling does not inhibit the development of TFH cells, a key subset for the generation of autoantibody producing autoreactive plasma B cells. A balance among costimulatory and inhibitory signals is required for immune homeostasis. Excessive costimulation and/or insufficient co-inhibition leads to the tolerance-breakdown and autoimmunity. CD16a mediated costimulation provides a positive signal in the activated CD4+ T cells and not in the quiescent cells which lack FcγR expression.

== See also ==
- Fc receptor-like molecule
