= Margetuximab =

Monoclonal antibody

Monoclonal antibody
- Type: Whole antibody
- Source: Chimeric (mouse/human)
- Target: HER2

Clinical data
- Trade names: Margenza
- Other names: margetuximab-cmkb, MGAH22
- License data: US DailyMed: Margetuximab
- Pregnancy category: Not recommended. Margetuximab can cause fetal harm when administered to a pregnant woman.
- Routes of administration: Intravenous
- Drug class: HER2/neu receptor antagonist
- ATC code: L01FD06 (WHO)

Legal status
- Legal status: US: ℞-only

Identifiers
- CAS Number: 1350624-75-7
- DrugBank: DB14967
- ChemSpider: None
- UNII: K911R84KEW
- KEGG: D10446

Chemical and physical data
- Formula: C_{6484}H_{10010}N_{1726}O_{2024}S_{42}
- Molar mass: 145873.98 g·mol^{−1}

Margetuximab, sold under the brand name Margenza, is a chimeric IgG monoclonal antibody medication against HER2 used for the treatment of cancer.

The most common adverse drug reactions in combination with chemotherapy are fatigue/asthenia, nausea, diarrhea, vomiting, constipation, headache, pyrexia, alopecia, abdominal pain, peripheral neuropathy, arthralgia/myalgia, cough, decreased appetite, dyspnea, infusion-related reactions, palmar-plantar erythrodysesthesia, and extremity pain.

This drug was created by Raven biotechnologies, which was later acquired by MacroGenics. It was engineered to increase affinity for CD16A polymorphisms and decrease affinity for FcγRIIB (CD32B), an inhibitory receptor.

It binds to the same target (epitope) as trastuzumab, on the HER2 receptor.

== Medical uses ==
Margetuximab is indicated, in combination with chemotherapy, for the treatment of adults with metastatic HER2-positive breast cancer who have received two or more prior anti-HER2 regimens, at least one of which was for metastatic disease.

== History ==
It is in phase III clinical trials for combination therapy in metastatic breast cancer in collaboration with Merck. Phase II trials are also in progress for gastric cancer and esophageal cancer.

In June 2020, it received orphan drug designation from the U.S. Food and Drug Administration (FDA).

Efficacy was evaluated in SOPHIA (NCT02492711), a randomized, multicenter, open-label trial of 536 participants with IHC 3+ or ISH-amplified HER2+ metastatic breast cancer who had received prior treatment with other anti-HER2 therapies. Participants were randomized (1:1) to margetuximab plus chemotherapy or trastuzumab plus chemotherapy. Randomization was stratified by chemotherapy choice (capecitabine, eribulin, gemcitabine, or vinorelbine), number of lines of therapy in the metastatic setting (≤ 2, > 2), and number of metastatic sites (≤ 2, > 2). The trial was conducted at 166 sites in the United States and 16 other countries.

It was approved for medical use in the United States in December 2020.
