= ZFP91 =

Protein-coding gene in the species Homo sapiens

Identifiers
- Aliases: ZFP91, DMS-8, DSM-8, PZF, ZFP-91, ZNF757, FKSG11, ZFP91 zinc finger protein, ZFP91 zinc finger protein, atypical E3 ubiquitin ligase, DSM8
- External IDs: MGI: 104854; GeneCards: ZFP91
Available structures
PDB	Ortholog search: PDBe RCSB
PDB	List of PDB id codes 2M9A
Enzyme activity
EC #	BRENDA	ExPASy	KEGG	MetaCyc
2.3.2.27	↗	↗	↗	↗

Gene location (Human)
Chr.	Chromosome 11 (human)
Band	11q12.1	Start	58,579,063 bp
Band	11q12.1	End	58,621,550 bp

Gene location (Mouse)
Chr.	Chromosome 19 (mouse)
Band	19 A|19 8.73 cM	Start	12,744,384 bp
Band	19 A|19 8.73 cM	End	12,773,490 bp
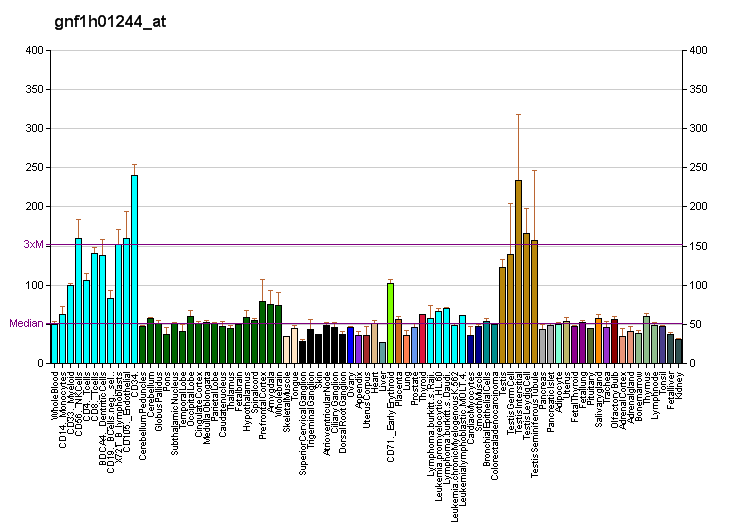
RNA expression pattern
Bgee	Human / Mouse (ortholog); Top expressed in: tibialis anterior muscle; mucosa of ileum; myocardium of left ventricle; deltoid muscle; cardiac muscle tissue of right atrium; cerebellar vermis; skin of arm; sperm; quadriceps femoris muscle; cartilage tissue / Top expressed in: ascending aorta; aortic valve; Rostral migratory stream; soleus muscle; gastrocnemius muscle; tibialis anterior muscle; plantaris muscle; extensor digitorum longus muscle; ankle; quadriceps femoris muscle; More reference expression data
BioGPS	More reference expression data
Gene ontology
Molecular function	metal ion binding; nucleic acid binding; ubiquitin-protein transferase activity; transferase activity; DNA-binding transcription factor activity, RNA polymerase II-specific
Cellular component	nucleus; nucleolus
Biological process	protein K63-linked ubiquitination; activation of NF-kappaB-inducing kinase activity; protein ubiquitination; regulation of transcription by RNA polymerase II
Sources:Amigo / QuickGO
Orthologs
Databases	NCBI: entry; OMA: entry
Species	Human	Mouse
Entrez	80829	109910
Ensembl	ENSG00000186660	ENSMUSG00000024695
UniProt	Q96JP5	Q62511
RefSeq (mRNA)	NM_053023; NM_001197051	NM_053009
RefSeq (protein)	NP_001183980; NP_444251	NP_443735
Location (UCSC)	Chr 11: 58.58 – 58.62 Mb	Chr 19: 12.74 – 12.77 Mb
PubMed search
- Wikidata
View/Edit Human	View/Edit Mouse

Zinc finger protein 91 homolog is a protein that in humans is encoded by the ZFP91 gene.

The protein encoded by this gene is a member of the zinc finger family of proteins. The gene product contains C2H2 type domains, which are the classical zinc finger domains found in numerous nucleic acid-binding proteins. In addition to the monocistronic transcript originating from this locus, a co-transcribed variant composed of ZFP91 and CNTF sequence has been identified. The monocistronic and co-transcribed variants encode distinct isoforms. The co-transcription of ZFP91 and CNTF has also been observed in mouse.
