= MINAR2 =

Protein-coding gene in the species Homo sapiens

Identifiers
- Aliases: MINAR2, KIAA1024 like, KIAA1024L, membrane integral NOTCH2 associated receptor 2
- External IDs: MGI: 2442934; HomoloGene: 18350; GeneCards: MINAR2; OMA:MINAR2 - orthologs

Gene location (Human)
Chr.	Chromosome 5 (human)
Band	5q23.3	Start	129,748,094 bp
Band	5q23.3	End	129,766,732 bp

Gene location (Mouse)
Chr.	Chromosome 18 (mouse)
Band	18|18 D3	Start	59,195,320 bp
Band	18|18 D3	End	59,210,034 bp
RNA expression pattern
Bgee	Human / Mouse (ortholog); Top expressed in: gonad; skeletal muscle tissue; monocyte; smooth muscle tissue; endometrium; body of uterus; ectocervix; placenta; hypothalamus; Brodmann area 9 / Top expressed in: arcuate nucleus; paraventricular nucleus of hypothalamus; median eminence; dorsomedial hypothalamic nucleus; otolith organ; utricle; ventromedial nucleus; suprachiasmatic nucleus; ventral tegmental area; lateral hypothalamus; More reference expression data
BioGPS	n/a
Orthologs
Species	Human	Mouse
Entrez	100127206	225583
Ensembl	ENSG00000186367	ENSMUSG00000050875
UniProt	P59773	Q8C4X7
RefSeq (mRNA)	NM_001257308	NM_001167925; NM_173759
RefSeq (protein)	NP_001244237	NP_001161397; NP_776120
Location (UCSC)	Chr 5: 129.75 – 129.77 Mb	Chr 18: 59.2 – 59.21 Mb
PubMed search
- Wikidata
View/Edit Human	View/Edit Mouse

Major intrinsically disordered NOTCH2-binding receptor 1-like is a protein that in humans is encoded by the MINAR2 gene. The MINAR2 protein binds to cholesterol, and in particular may be involved with cholesterol regulation in hair cells. It may also be involved in angiogenesis. The long-form protein name is a reference to its homolog: major intrinsically disordered Notch2-binding receptor 1.
