= PSG5 =

Protein-coding gene in the species Homo sapiens

Identifiers
- Aliases: PSG5, FL-NCA-3, PSG, pregnancy specific beta-1-glycoprotein 5
- External IDs: OMIM: 176394; GeneCards: PSG5

Gene location (Human)
Chr.	Chromosome 19 (human)
Band	19q13.31	Start	43,166,256 bp
Band	19q13.31	End	43,186,536 bp
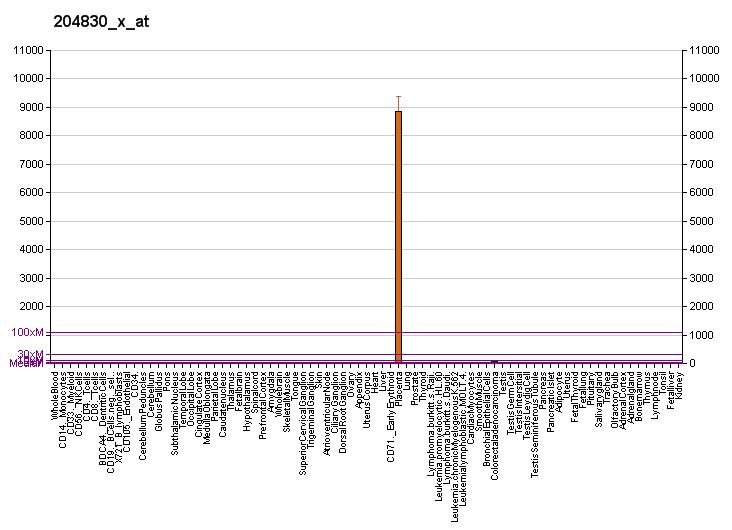
RNA expression pattern
Bgee	Human / Mouse (ortholog); Top expressed in: placenta; decidua; buccal mucosa cell; testicle; stromal cell of endometrium; endothelial cell; gonad; cardia; germ cell; male germ cell / n/a; More reference expression data
BioGPS	More reference expression data
Gene ontology
Molecular function	protein binding
Cellular component	extracellular region
Biological process	female pregnancy
Sources:Amigo / QuickGO
Orthologs
Databases	NCBI: entry; OMA: entry
Species	Human	Mouse
Entrez	5673	n/a
Ensembl	ENSG00000204941	n/a
UniProt	Q15238	n/a
RefSeq (mRNA)	NM_001130014; NM_002781	n/a
RefSeq (protein)	NP_001123486; NP_002772	n/a
Location (UCSC)	Chr 19: 43.17 – 43.19 Mb	n/a
PubMed search		n/a
- Wikidata
View/Edit Human

Pregnancy-specific beta-1-glycoprotein 5 is a protein that in humans is encoded by the PSG5 gene.
