= Ciliary neurotrophic factor receptor =

Protein found in humans

CNTFR

Identifiers
- Aliases: CNTFR, ciliary neurotrophic factor receptor
- External IDs: OMIM: 118946; MGI: 99605; GeneCards: CNTFR
Available structures
PDB	Ortholog search: PDBe RCSB
PDB	List of PDB id codes 1UC6

Gene location (Human)
Chr.	Chromosome 9 (human)
Band	9p13.3	Start	34,551,432 bp
Band	9p13.3	End	34,590,140 bp

Gene location (Mouse)
Chr.	Chromosome 4 (mouse)
Band	4 A5|4 21.81 cM	Start	41,657,498 bp
Band	4 A5|4 21.81 cM	End	41,697,089 bp
RNA expression pattern
Bgee	Human / Mouse (ortholog); Top expressed in: ventricular zone; ganglionic eminence; right hemisphere of cerebellum; gastrocnemius muscle; right frontal lobe; caudate nucleus; nucleus accumbens; putamen; amygdala; cingulate gyrus / Top expressed in: ventricular zone; superior frontal gyrus; genital tubercle; muscle of thigh; cerebellar cortex; dentate gyrus of hippocampal formation granule cell; primary visual cortex; neural layer of retina; lip; motor neuron; More reference expression data
BioGPS	n/a
Gene ontology
Molecular function	signaling receptor binding; cytokine receptor activity; cytokine binding; ciliary neurotrophic factor receptor activity; protein binding; interleukin-27 receptor binding
Cellular component	apical plasma membrane; plasma membrane; membrane; CNTFR-CLCF1 complex; ciliary neurotrophic factor receptor complex; extrinsic component of membrane; anchored component of membrane; external side of plasma membrane; receptor complex
Biological process	nervous system development; negative regulation of neuron apoptotic process; suckling behavior; ciliary neurotrophic factor-mediated signaling pathway; skeletal muscle organ development; positive regulation of cell population proliferation; brainstem development; sex differentiation; signal transduction; cytokine-mediated signaling pathway
Sources:Amigo / QuickGO
Orthologs
Databases	NCBI: entry; OMA: entry
Species	Human	Mouse
Entrez	1271	12804
Ensembl	ENSG00000122756	ENSMUSG00000028444
UniProt	P26992	O88507
RefSeq (mRNA)	NM_001207011; NM_001842; NM_147164	NM_001136056; NM_001146080; NM_016673; NM_001379211; NM_001379212 NM_001379213; NM_001379214; NM_001379215; NM_001379216
RefSeq (protein)	NP_001193940; NP_001833; NP_671693	NP_001129528; NP_057882; NP_001366140; NP_001366141; NP_001366142 NP_001366143; NP_001366144; NP_001366145; NP_001390675; NP_001390676
Location (UCSC)	Chr 9: 34.55 – 34.59 Mb	Chr 4: 41.66 – 41.7 Mb
PubMed search
- Wikidata
View/Edit Human	View/Edit Mouse

The ciliary neurotrophic factor receptor, also known as CNTFR, binds the ciliary neurotrophic factor. This receptor and its cognate ligand support the survival of neurons. This receptor is most closely related to the interleukin-6 receptor. This receptor possesses an unusual attachment to the cell membrane through a glycophosphatidylinositol linkage.
