= Leukocyte immunoglobulin-like receptor pseudogene 2 =

Protein found in humans

LILRP2

Identifiers
- Aliases: LILRP2, CD85m, ILT10, LILRA5, leukocyte immunoglobulin-like receptor pseudogene 2
- External IDs: GeneCards: LILRP2

Gene location (Human)
Chr.	Chromosome 19 (human)
Band	19q13.42	Start	54,707,916 bp
Band	19q13.42	End	54,713,453 bp
Orthologs
Databases	NCBI: entry; OMA: entry
Species	Human	Mouse
Entrez	79166	n/a
Ensembl	ENSG00000283794; ENSG00000273922; ENSG00000275289; ENSG00000284314; ENSG00000274861 ENSG00000170858; ENSG00000273755; ENSG00000273864; ENSG00000274788; ENSG00000284051; ENSG00000273528; ENSG00000284405; ENSG00000283800; ENSG00000276247; ENSG00000278288; ENSG00000274120; ENSG00000273666; ENSG00000284097; ENSG00000284593; ENSG00000276243; ENSG00000283732; ENSG00000275462; ENSG00000276976; ENSG00000277267; ENSG00000284374; ENSG00000274842; ENSG00000283983; ENSG00000277963; ENSG00000284141; ENSG00000284339; ENSG00000275442; ENSG00000274826; ENSG00000273883; ENSG00000284030; ENSG00000283942; ENSG00000278795; ENSG00000277271; ENSG00000276512	n/a
UniProt	n a	n/a
RefSeq (mRNA)	NM_024317	n/a
RefSeq (protein)	n/a	n/a
Location (UCSC)	Chr 19: 54.71 – 54.71 Mb	n/a
PubMed search		n/a
- Wikidata
View/Edit Human

Leukocyte immunoglobulin-like receptor pseudogene 2 is a protein that in humans is encoded by the LILRP2 gene.
