= LRRC4 =

Protein-coding gene in the species Homo sapiens

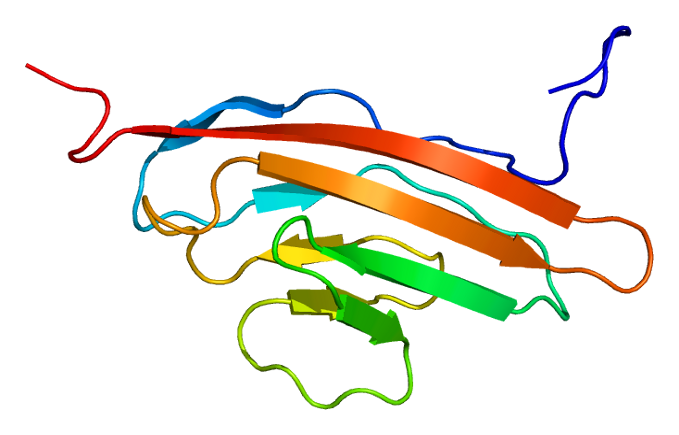

Identifiers
- Aliases: LRRC4, NGL-2, NAG14, leucine rich repeat containing 4
- External IDs: OMIM: 610486; MGI: 2182081; GeneCards: LRRC4
Available structures
PDB	Ortholog search: PDBe RCSB
PDB	List of PDB id codes 2DL9, 3ZYI

Gene location (Human)
Chr.	Chromosome 7 (human)
Band	7q32.1	Start	128,027,071 bp
Band	7q32.1	End	128,032,107 bp

Gene location (Mouse)
Chr.	Chromosome 6 (mouse)
Band	6|6 A3.3	Start	28,661,830 bp
Band	6|6 A3.3	End	28,831,746 bp
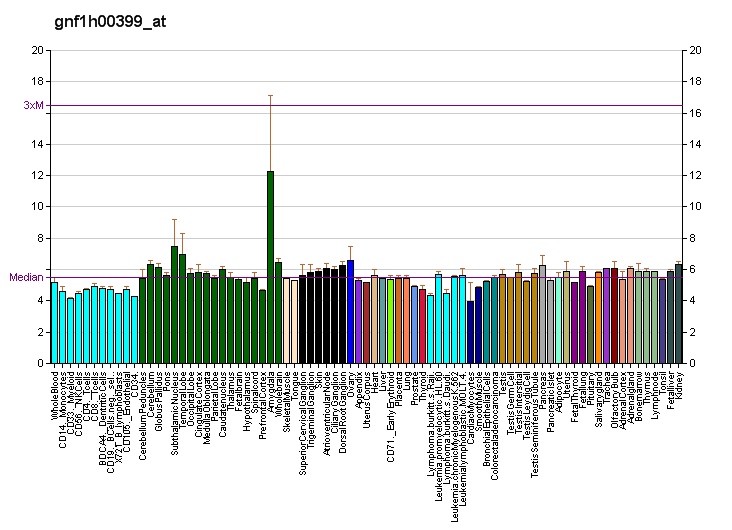
RNA expression pattern
Bgee	Human / Mouse (ortholog); Top expressed in: ventricular zone; prefrontal cortex; right frontal lobe; bronchial epithelial cell; dorsolateral prefrontal cortex; Brodmann area 9; right hemisphere of cerebellum; cingulate gyrus; anterior cingulate cortex; cerebellar vermis / Top expressed in: interventricular septum; dentate gyrus of hippocampal formation granule cell; visual cortex; primary visual cortex; piriform cortex; cingulate gyrus; superior frontal gyrus; lobe of cerebellum; hippocampus proper; primary motor cortex; More reference expression data
BioGPS	More reference expression data
Gene ontology
Molecular function	protein kinase inhibitor activity; protein binding
Cellular component	cytoplasm; integral component of membrane; neuron spine; cell junction; postsynaptic membrane; dendritic spine; plasma membrane; synapse; excitatory synapse; membrane; Schaffer collateral - CA1 synapse; glutamatergic synapse; integral component of postsynaptic density membrane
Biological process	synapse organization; postsynaptic density protein 95 clustering; regulation of synapse organization; negative regulation of protein kinase activity; cytokine-mediated signaling pathway; negative regulation of receptor signaling pathway via JAK-STAT; modulation of chemical synaptic transmission; synaptic membrane adhesion; excitatory synapse assembly
Sources:Amigo / QuickGO
Orthologs
Databases	NCBI: entry; OMA: entry
Species	Human	Mouse
Entrez	64101	192198
Ensembl	ENSG00000128594	ENSMUSG00000049939
UniProt	Q9HBW1	Q99PH1
RefSeq (mRNA)	NM_022143	NM_138682
RefSeq (protein)	NP_071426	NP_619623
Location (UCSC)	Chr 7: 128.03 – 128.03 Mb	Chr 6: 28.66 – 28.83 Mb
PubMed search
- Wikidata
View/Edit Human	View/Edit Mouse

Leucine-rich repeat-containing protein 4 is a protein that in humans is encoded by the LRRC4 gene.

This gene is significantly downregulated in primary brain tumors. The exact function of the protein encoded by this gene is unknown. Also it has been identified as a possible pathogenic gene involved in the neurogenic inflammation in rosacea.
