= PSG6 =

Protein-coding gene in humans

Identifiers
- Aliases: PSG6, PSBG-10, PSBG-12, PSBG-6, PSG10, PSGGB, pregnancy specific beta-1-glycoprotein 6
- External IDs: OMIM: 176395; GeneCards: PSG6

Gene location (Human)
| Chr. | Chromosome 19 (human) |
| Band | 19q13.31 | Start | 42,902,086 bp |
| Band | 19q13.31 | End | 42,919,563 bp |
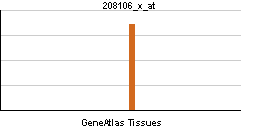

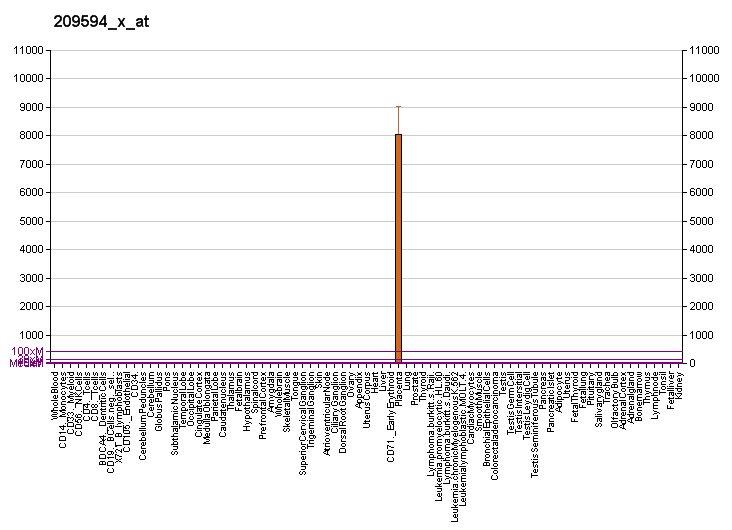

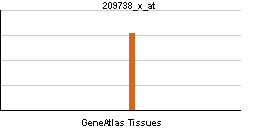
RNA expression pattern
| Bgee | Human / Mouse (ortholog); Top expressed in: placenta; decidua; mucosa of ileum; stromal cell of endometrium; skin of thigh; smooth muscle tissue; blood; gonad; bone marrow; corpus callosum / n/a; More reference expression data |
| BioGPS | More reference expression data |
Gene ontology
| Molecular function | molecular function |
| Cellular component | extracellular region |
| Biological process | female pregnancy |
Sources:Amigo / QuickGO
Orthologs
| Databases | NCBI: entry; OMA: entry |
| Species | Human | Mouse |
| Entrez | 5675 | n/a |
| Ensembl | ENSG00000170848 | n/a |
| UniProt | Q00889 | n/a |
| RefSeq (mRNA) | NM_002782; NM_001031850 | n/a |
| RefSeq (protein) | NP_001027020; NP_002773 | n/a |
| Location (UCSC) | Chr 19: 42.9 – 42.92 Mb | n/a |
| PubMed search | | n/a |
- Wikidata
| View/Edit Human |

Pregnancy-specific beta-1-glycoprotein 6 is a protein that in humans is encoded by the PSG6 gene.
