= VSIG2 =

Protein-coding gene in the species Homo sapiens

Identifiers
- Aliases: VSIG2, 2210413P10Rik, CTH, CTXL, V-set and immunoglobulin domain containing 2
- External IDs: OMIM: 606011; MGI: 1928009; GeneCards: VSIG2

Gene location (Human)
Chr.	Chromosome 11 (human)
Band	11q24.2	Start	124,747,474 bp
Band	11q24.2	End	124,752,255 bp

Gene location (Mouse)
Chr.	Chromosome 9 (mouse)
Band	9|9 A4	Start	37,450,551 bp
Band	9|9 A4	End	37,455,501 bp
RNA expression pattern
Bgee	Human / Mouse (ortholog); Top expressed in: pancreatic ductal cell; mucosa of transverse colon; rectum; nasal epithelium; buccal mucosa cell; amniotic fluid; pylorus; left lobe of thyroid gland; right lobe of thyroid gland; mucosa of sigmoid colon / Top expressed in: pyloric antrum; epithelium of stomach; transitional epithelium of urinary bladder; mucous cell of stomach; superior frontal gyrus; primary visual cortex; muscle of thigh; left lung lobe; duodenum; dentate gyrus of hippocampal formation granule cell; More reference expression data
BioGPS	n/a
Orthologs
Databases	NCBI: entry; OMA: entry
Species	Human	Mouse
Entrez	23584	57276
Ensembl	ENSG00000019102	ENSMUSG00000001943
UniProt	Q96IQ7	Q9Z109
RefSeq (mRNA)	NM_014312; NM_001329920	NM_020518
RefSeq (protein)	NP_001316849; NP_055127	NP_065264
Location (UCSC)	Chr 11: 124.75 – 124.75 Mb	Chr 9: 37.45 – 37.46 Mb
PubMed search
- Wikidata
View/Edit Human	View/Edit Mouse

V-set and immunoglobulin domain containing 2 is a protein in humans that is encoded by the VSIG2 gene.
