= PSG10P =

Pseudogene in humans

Identifiers
- Aliases: PSG10P, PSG10, PSG12, pregnancy specific beta-1-glycoprotein 10, pseudogene
- External IDs: OMIM: 176399; GeneCards: PSG10P
Orthologs
Databases	NCBI: entry; OMA: entry
Species	Human	Mouse
Entrez	653492	n/a
Ensembl	ENSG00000248257	n/a
UniProt	n a	n/a
RefSeq (mRNA)	NM_176809	n/a
RefSeq (protein)	n/a	n/a
Location (UCSC)	n/a	n/a
PubMed search		n/a
- Wikidata
View/Edit Human

PSG10P is a non-coding pseudogene in the pregnancy-specific glycoprotein gene family.
