= PSG2 =

Protein-coding gene in the species Homo sapiens

Identifiers
- Aliases: PSG2, CEA, PSBG2, PSG1, pregnancy specific beta-1-glycoprotein 2
- External IDs: OMIM: 176391; GeneCards: PSG2

Gene location (Human)
Chr.	Chromosome 19 (human)
Band	19q13.31	Start	43,064,209 bp
Band	19q13.31	End	43,083,045 bp
RNA expression pattern
Bgee	Human / Mouse (ortholog); Top expressed in: placenta; decidua; testicle; gonad; stromal cell of endometrium; muscle of thigh; monocyte; sural nerve; renal cortex; primary visual cortex / n/a; More reference expression data
BioGPS	n/a
Gene ontology
Molecular function	molecular function
Cellular component	extracellular region; cellular component
Biological process	cell migration; female pregnancy
Sources:Amigo / QuickGO
Orthologs
Databases	NCBI: entry; OMA: entry
Species	Human	Mouse
Entrez	5670	n/a
Ensembl	ENSG00000242221	n/a
UniProt	P11465	n/a
RefSeq (mRNA)	NM_031246	n/a
RefSeq (protein)	NP_112536	n/a
Location (UCSC)	Chr 19: 43.06 – 43.08 Mb	n/a
PubMed search		n/a
- Wikidata
View/Edit Human

Pregnancy-specific beta-1-glycoprotein 2 is a protein that in humans is encoded by the PSG2 gene.

== Structure ==
Molecular cloning and analysis of several PSG genes has shown that PSG forms a subset of the carcinoembryonic antigen (CEA) gene family that belongs to the immunoglobulin superfamily genes.

Members of the CEA family consist of a single N domain structurally similar to the immunoglobulin variable domain, followed by a variable number of constant immunoglobulin-like A and/or B domains. Most PSGs have the Argglyasp (RGD) motif in the N-terminal domain.

== Function ==
Human pregnancy-specific glycoproteins (PSGs) are a family of proteins synthesized in large quantities by the placental trophoblast and released into the maternal circulation during pregnancy.

PSG2 has been shown to act as an adhesion recognition signal for some integrins.
