= FCRLA =

Protein

Identifiers
- Aliases: FCRLA, FCRL, FCRL1, FCRLM1, FCRLX, FCRLb, FCRLc1, FCRLc2, FCRLd, FCRLe, FCRX, FREB, Fc receptor like A
- External IDs: OMIM: 606891; MGI: 2138647; GeneCards: FCRLA
Available structures
PDB	Ortholog search: PDBe RCSB
PDB	List of PDB id codes 4HWN

Gene location (Human)
Chr.	Chromosome 1 (human)
Band	1q23.3	Start	161,706,972 bp
Band	1q23.3	End	161,714,352 bp

Gene location (Mouse)
Chr.	Chromosome 1 (mouse)
Band	1|1 H3	Start	170,745,145 bp
Band	1|1 H3	End	170,755,152 bp
RNA expression pattern
Bgee	Human / Mouse (ortholog); Top expressed in: mucosa of ileum; lymph node; epithelium of nasopharynx; spleen; appendix; superficial temporal artery; pancreatic ductal cell; bone marrow cell; granulocyte; blood / Top expressed in: spleen; mesenteric lymph nodes; blood; granulocyte; spermatocyte; bone marrow; subcutaneous adipose tissue; tibiofemoral joint; thymus; spermatid; More reference expression data
BioGPS	n/a
Orthologs
Databases	NCBI: entry; OMA: entry
Species	Human	Mouse
Entrez	84824	98752
Ensembl	ENSG00000132185	ENSMUSG00000038421
UniProt	Q7L513	Q920A9
RefSeq (mRNA)	NM_001184866; NM_001184867; NM_001184870; NM_001184871; NM_001184872 NM_001184873; NM_032738; NM_001366195; NM_001366196	NM_001160215; NM_145141
RefSeq (protein)	NP_001171795; NP_001171796; NP_001171799; NP_001171800; NP_001171801 NP_001171802; NP_116127; NP_001353124; NP_001353125	NP_001153687; NP_660123
Location (UCSC)	Chr 1: 161.71 – 161.71 Mb	Chr 1: 170.75 – 170.76 Mb
PubMed search
- Wikidata
View/Edit Human	View/Edit Mouse

Fc receptor-like A is a protein that in humans is encoded by the FCRLA gene.

Receptors for the Fc fragment of IgG, or FCGRs (see MIM 146790), are cell surface glycoproteins of the Ig superfamily (IgSF). These receptors mediate phagocytosis of IgG-coated pathogens and promote activation of effector cells, leading to inflammatory responses and antibody-mediated cellular cytotoxicity. All FCGR genes map to human chromosome 1. Additional genes in this region, including FREB, encode FCGR homologs that are selectively expressed in B cells and may be implicated in B-cell development and lymphomagenesis.[supplied by OMIM]
