= TMIGD2 =

Protein-coding gene in the species Homo sapiens

Identifiers
- Aliases: TMIGD2, IGPR-1, IGPR1, CD28H, transmembrane and immunoglobulin domain containing 2
- External IDs: OMIM: 614715; GeneCards: TMIGD2

Gene location (Human)
Chr.	Chromosome 19 (human)
Band	19p13.3	Start	4,292,227 bp
Band	19p13.3	End	4,302,431 bp
RNA expression pattern
Bgee	Human / Mouse (ortholog); Top expressed in: myocardium of left ventricle; vena cava; buccal mucosa cell; cardiac muscle tissue of right atrium; cerebellar vermis; thymus; nasal epithelium; superficial temporal artery; cardia; Skeletal muscle tissue of rectus abdominis / n/a; More reference expression data
BioGPS	n/a
Gene ontology
Molecular function	protein binding; coreceptor activity
Cellular component	integral component of membrane; plasma membrane; membrane; extracellular space
Biological process	T cell costimulation; immune response; positive regulation of cytokine production; immunoglobulin production; positive regulation of activated T cell proliferation; positive regulation of angiogenesis; signal transduction
Sources:Amigo / QuickGO
Orthologs
Databases	NCBI: entry; OMA: entry
Species	Human	Mouse
Entrez	126259	n/a
Ensembl	ENSG00000167664	n/a
UniProt	Q96BF3	n/a
RefSeq (mRNA)	NM_001169126; NM_001308232; NM_144615; NM_001395549	n/a
RefSeq (protein)	NP_001162597; NP_001295161; NP_653216	n/a
Location (UCSC)	Chr 19: 4.29 – 4.3 Mb	n/a
PubMed search		n/a
- Wikidata
View/Edit Human

Transmembrane and immunoglobulin domain containing 2 is a protein that in humans is encoded by the TMIGD2 gene. TMIGD2 was discovered by Nader Rahimi.
