= FCGR3A =

Protein-coding gene in humans

Identifiers
- Aliases: FCGR3A, CD16, CD16A, FCG3, FCGR3, FCGRIII, FCR-10, FCRIII, FCRIIIA, IGFR3, IMD20, Fc fragment of IgG receptor IIIa, Fc gamma receptor IIIa, FcGRIIIA, CD16-II
- External IDs: OMIM: 146740; MGI: 2179523; GeneCards: FCGR3A
Available structures
PDB	Ortholog search: PDBe RCSB
PDB	List of PDB id codes 3AY4, 3SGJ, 3SGK, 3WN5, 5D6D, 5BW7

Gene location (Human)
Chr.	Chromosome 1 (human)
Band	1q23.3	Start	161,541,759 bp
Band	1q23.3	End	161,550,737 bp

Gene location (Mouse)
Chr.	Chromosome 1 (mouse)
Band	1 H3|1 78.53 cM	Start	170,846,489 bp
Band	1 H3|1 78.53 cM	End	170,857,330 bp
RNA expression pattern
Bgee	Human / Mouse (ortholog); Top expressed in: granulocyte; monocyte; blood; spleen; appendix; placenta; right lung; upper lobe of left lung; C1 segment; left adrenal gland / Top expressed in: granulocyte; ileum; jejunum; spleen; liver; ovary; secondary oocyte; bone marrow; adrenal gland; embryo; More reference expression data
BioGPS	n/a
Gene ontology
Molecular function	IgG binding
Cellular component	integral component of membrane; extracellular region; plasma membrane; extracellular exosome; external side of plasma membrane; membrane
Biological process	immune response; Fc-gamma receptor signaling pathway involved in phagocytosis; regulation of immune response
Sources:Amigo / QuickGO
Orthologs
Databases	NCBI: entry; OMA: entry
Species	Human	Mouse
Entrez	2214	246256
Ensembl	ENSG00000203747	ENSMUSG00000059089
UniProt	P08637	A0A0B4J1G0
RefSeq (mRNA)	NM_000569; NM_001127592; NM_001127593; NM_001127595; NM_001127596 NM_001329120; NM_001329122; NM_001386450	NM_144559; NM_180961
RefSeq (protein)	NP_000560; NP_001121064; NP_001121065; NP_001121067; NP_001121068 NP_001316049; NP_001316051	NP_653142
Location (UCSC)	Chr 1: 161.54 – 161.55 Mb	Chr 1: 170.85 – 170.86 Mb
PubMed search
- Wikidata
View/Edit Human	View/Edit Mouse

Low affinity immunoglobulin gamma Fc region receptor III-A is a protein that in humans is encoded by the FCGR3A gene. It is also known as CD16a as it is part of the cluster of differentiation cell surface molecules.

== See also ==
- Binding affinity
- Immunoglobulin G (IgG)
- Fc receptor
  - Fc-gamma receptor
- Fc region
- CD16
