= PSG4 =

Protein-coding gene in the species Homo sapiens

Identifiers
- Aliases: PSG4, PSG9, PSBG-4, PSBG-9, pregnancy specific beta-1-glycoprotein 4
- External IDs: OMIM: 176393; GeneCards: PSG4

Gene location (Human)
Chr.	Chromosome 19 (human)
Band	19q13.31	Start	43,192,702 bp
Band	19q13.31	End	43,207,299 bp
RNA expression pattern
Bgee	Human / Mouse (ortholog); Top expressed in: placenta; decidua; tibialis anterior muscle; skin of thigh; skin of arm; amniotic fluid; skin of hip; islet of Langerhans; skin of abdomen; palpebral conjunctiva / n/a; More reference expression data
BioGPS	n/a
Orthologs
Databases	NCBI: entry; OMA: entry
Species	Human	Mouse
Entrez	5672	n/a
Ensembl	ENSG00000243137	n/a
UniProt	Q00888; Q96QL5; Q6P520	n/a
RefSeq (mRNA)	NM_001276495; NM_002780; NM_213633; NM_001316339	n/a
RefSeq (protein)	NP_001263424; NP_001303268; NP_002771; NP_998798; NP_001263424.1 NP_001303268.1; NP_002771.2; NP_998798.1; NP_001303268.1	n/a
Location (UCSC)	Chr 19: 43.19 – 43.21 Mb	n/a
PubMed search		n/a
- Wikidata
View/Edit Human

Pregnancy-specific beta-1-glycoprotein 4 is a protein that in humans is encoded by the PSG4 gene.
