= CILP =

Protein-coding gene in humans

Identifiers
- Aliases: CILP, CILP-1, HsT18872, cartilage intermediate layer protein
- External IDs: OMIM: 603489; MGI: 2444507; GeneCards: CILP

Gene location (Human)
Chr.	Chromosome 15 (human)
Band	15q22.31	Start	65,194,760 bp
Band	15q22.31	End	65,211,473 bp

Gene location (Mouse)
Chr.	Chromosome 9 (mouse)
Band	9|9 C	Start	65,172,462 bp
Band	9|9 C	End	65,187,887 bp
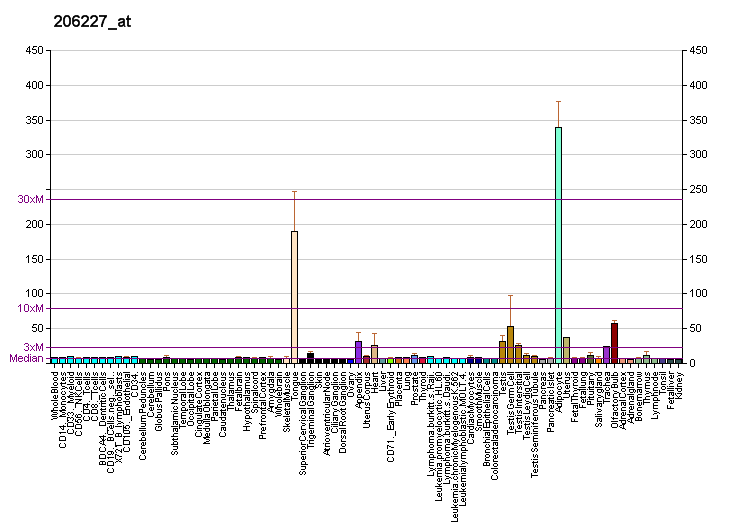
RNA expression pattern
Bgee	Human / Mouse (ortholog); Top expressed in: Achilles tendon; tendon of biceps brachii; synovial joint; pericardium; subcutaneous adipose tissue; skin of hip; thoracic diaphragm; gallbladder; decidua; tibia / Top expressed in: ankle; intercostal muscle; sciatic nerve; lip; soleus muscle; epithelium of lens; esophagus; medial head of gastrocnemius muscle; temporal muscle; thoracic diaphragm; More reference expression data
BioGPS	More reference expression data
Gene ontology
Molecular function	nucleotide diphosphatase activity; alkaline phosphatase activity; extracellular matrix structural constituent
Cellular component	extracellular region; extracellular matrix; extracellular exosome; extracellular space; collagen-containing extracellular matrix
Biological process	negative regulation of insulin-like growth factor receptor signaling pathway; negative regulation of gene expression; dephosphorylation; negative regulation of SMAD protein signal transduction; cellular response to transforming growth factor beta stimulus
Sources:Amigo / QuickGO
Orthologs
Databases	NCBI: entry; OMA: entry
Species	Human	Mouse
Entrez	8483	214425
Ensembl	ENSG00000138615	ENSMUSG00000042254
UniProt	O75339	Q66K08
RefSeq (mRNA)	NM_003613	NM_173385; NM_001364527
RefSeq (protein)	NP_003604	NP_775561; NP_001351456
Location (UCSC)	Chr 15: 65.19 – 65.21 Mb	Chr 9: 65.17 – 65.19 Mb
PubMed search
- Wikidata
View/Edit Human	View/Edit Mouse

Cartilage intermediate layer protein 1 is a protein that in humans is encoded by the CILP gene.

Major alterations in the composition of the cartilage extracellular matrix occur in joint disease, such as osteoarthrosis. The synthesis of cartilage intermediate layer protein (CILP), which was identified and purified from human articular cartilage, increases in early osteoarthrosis cartilage. The C-terminal 460 amino acids of the protein show 90% similarity to the pig ectonucleotide pyrophosphohydrolase NTPPHase; this region is preceded by a furin protease consensus cleavage site. Thus, the CILP gene is thought to encode a protein precursor for 2 different proteins, namely CILP and a homolog of NTPPHase.
