= PSG3 =

Protein-coding gene in humans

Identifiers
- Aliases: PSG3, pregnancy specific beta-1-glycoprotein 3
- External IDs: OMIM: 176392; GeneCards: PSG3

Gene location (Human)
Chr.	Chromosome 19 (human)
Band	19q13.2	Start	42,721,638 bp
Band	19q13.2	End	42,740,481 bp
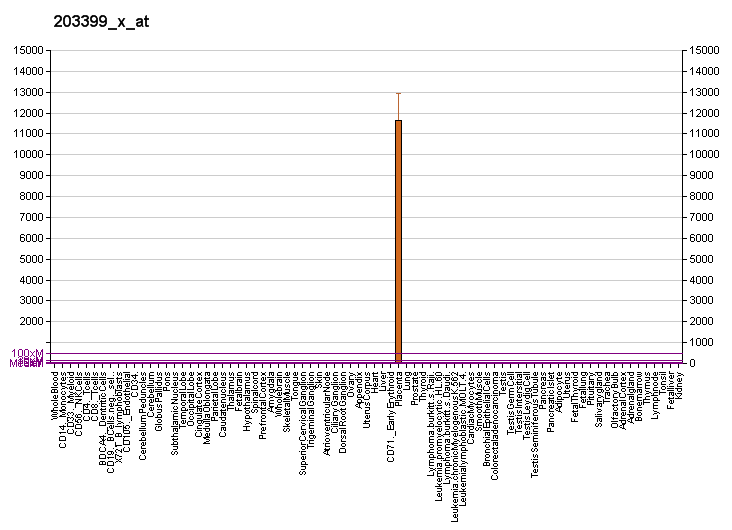
RNA expression pattern
Bgee	Human / Mouse (ortholog); Top expressed in: placenta; decidua; testicle; gonad; rectum; mucosa of ileum; mucosa of transverse colon; mouth; islet of Langerhans; corpus callosum / n/a; More reference expression data
BioGPS	More reference expression data
Orthologs
Databases	NCBI: entry; OMA: entry
Species	Human	Mouse
Entrez	5671	n/a
Ensembl	ENSG00000221826	n/a
UniProt	Q16557	n/a
RefSeq (mRNA)	NM_021016	n/a
RefSeq (protein)	NP_066296	n/a
Location (UCSC)	Chr 19: 42.72 – 42.74 Mb	n/a
PubMed search		n/a
- Wikidata
View/Edit Human

Pregnancy-specific beta-1-glycoprotein 3 is a protein that in humans is encoded by the PSG3 gene.
