= TMIGD1 =

Protein-coding gene in the species Homo sapiens

Identifiers
- Aliases: TMIGD1, TMIGD, UNQ9372, transmembrane and immunoglobulin domain containing 1
- External IDs: MGI: 1913851; GeneCards: TMIGD1

Gene location (Human)
Chr.	Chromosome 17 (human)
Band	17q11.2	Start	30,316,333 bp
Band	17q11.2	End	30,334,059 bp

Gene location (Mouse)
Chr.	Chromosome 11 (mouse)
Band	11|11 B5	Start	76,792,985 bp
Band	11|11 B5	End	76,807,413 bp
RNA expression pattern
Bgee	Human / Mouse (ortholog); Top expressed in: rectum; mucosa of transverse colon; epithelium of colon; human kidney; smooth muscle tissue; duodenum; appendix; renal cortex; muscle layer of sigmoid colon; lymph node / Top expressed in: intestinal villus; right kidney; human kidney; ileum; Paneth cell; proximal tubule; jejunum; esophagus; submandibular gland; epithelium of small intestine; More reference expression data
BioGPS	n/a
Orthologs
Databases	NCBI: entry; OMA: entry
Species	Human	Mouse
Entrez	388364	66601
Ensembl	ENSG00000182271	ENSMUSG00000020839
UniProt	Q6UXZ0	Q9D7L8
RefSeq (mRNA)	NM_206832; NM_001319942	NM_025655; NM_001382246; NM_001382247
RefSeq (protein)	NP_001306871; NP_996663	NP_079931; NP_001369175; NP_001369176
Location (UCSC)	Chr 17: 30.32 – 30.33 Mb	Chr 11: 76.79 – 76.81 Mb
PubMed search
- Wikidata
View/Edit Human	View/Edit Mouse

Transmembrane and immunoglobulin domain containing 1 is a protein that in humans is encoded by the TMIGD1 gene. TMIGD1 was discovered by the lab of Giancarlo Marra and later cloned by Nader Rahimi. Recent findings suggest functions in brush border formation (intestinal epithelium) and roles as tumor suppressor (kidney and intestine).
