= PSG9 =

Protein-coding gene in humans

Identifiers
- Aliases: PSG9, PS34, PSBG-11, PSBG-9, PSG11, PSGII, pregnancy specific beta-1-glycoprotein 9
- External IDs: OMIM: 176398; GeneCards: PSG9

Gene location (Human)
| Chr. | Chromosome 19 (human) |
| Band | 19q13.31 | Start | 43,211,791 bp |
| Band | 19q13.31 | End | 43,269,530 bp |
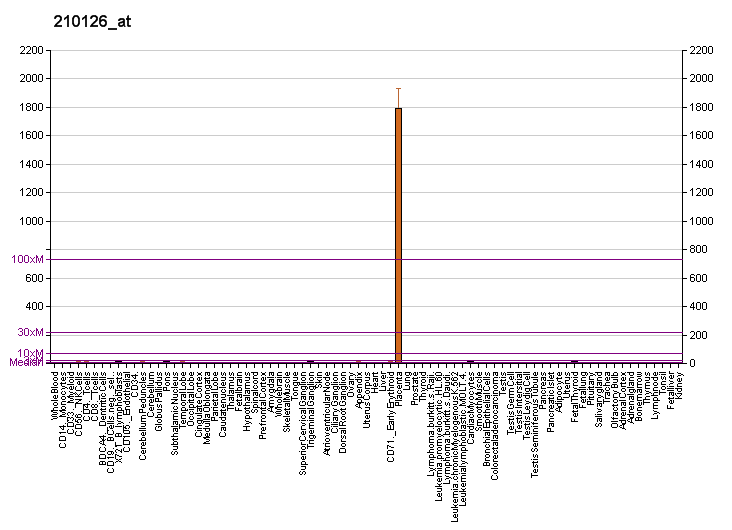

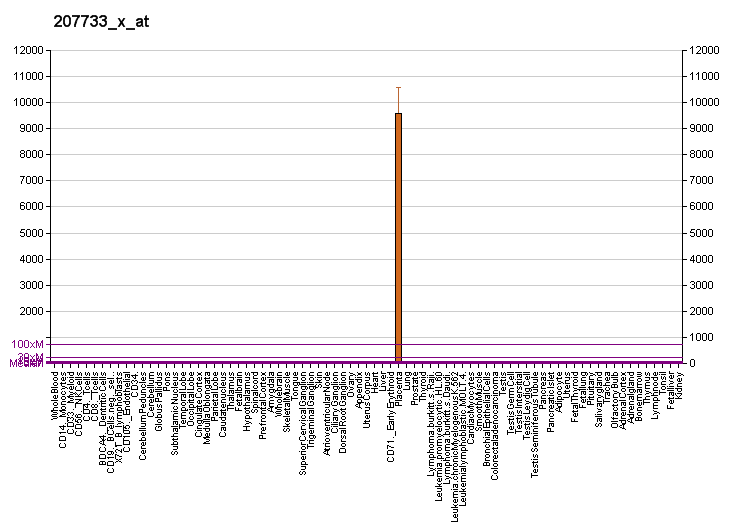
RNA expression pattern
| Bgee | Human / Mouse (ortholog); Top expressed in: placenta; decidua; testicle; mucosa of ileum; stromal cell of endometrium; rectum; islet of Langerhans; smooth muscle tissue; mucosa of colon; mucosa of transverse colon / n/a; More reference expression data |
| BioGPS | More reference expression data |
Orthologs
| Databases | NCBI: entry; OMA: entry |
| Species | Human | Mouse |
| Entrez | 5678 | n/a |
| Ensembl | ENSG00000183668 | n/a |
| UniProt | Q00887 | n/a |
| RefSeq (mRNA) | NM_001301707; NM_001301708; NM_001301709; NM_002784 | n/a |
| RefSeq (protein) | NP_001288636; NP_001288637; NP_001288638; NP_002775; NP_001288638.1 NP_001288637.1 | n/a |
| Location (UCSC) | Chr 19: 43.21 – 43.27 Mb | n/a |
| PubMed search | | n/a |
- Wikidata
| View/Edit Human |

Pregnancy-specific beta-1-glycoprotein 9 is a protein that in humans is encoded by the PSG9 gene.
