= Immunoglobulin superfamily member 3 =

Protein found in humans

IGSF3

Identifiers
- Aliases: IGSF3, EWI-3, V8, LCDD, immunoglobulin superfamily member 3
- External IDs: OMIM: 603491; MGI: 1926158; GeneCards: IGSF3

Gene location (Human)
Chr.	Chromosome 1 (human)
Band	1p13.1	Start	116,574,399 bp
Band	1p13.1	End	116,667,755 bp

Gene location (Mouse)
Chr.	Chromosome 3 (mouse)
Band	3 F2.2|3 44.3 cM	Start	101,284,399 bp
Band	3 F2.2|3 44.3 cM	End	101,370,375 bp
RNA expression pattern
Bgee	Human / Mouse (ortholog); Top expressed in: gingival epithelium; tibia; ganglionic eminence; vulva; hair follicle; middle temporal gyrus; placenta; ventricular zone; oral cavity; renal medulla / Top expressed in: cumulus cell; hand; superior cervical ganglion; molar; endocardial cushion; oocyte; secondary oocyte; primary oocyte; zygote; sexually immature organism; More reference expression data
BioGPS	n/a
Gene ontology
Molecular function	molecular function
Cellular component	membrane; cell surface; plasma membrane; integral component of membrane
Biological process	lacrimal gland development; cell surface receptor signaling pathway
Sources:Amigo / QuickGO
Orthologs
Databases	NCBI: entry; OMA: entry
Species	Human	Mouse
Entrez	3321	78908
Ensembl	ENSG00000143061	ENSMUSG00000042035
UniProt	O75054	Q6ZQA6
RefSeq (mRNA)	NM_001007237; NM_001542	NM_207205
RefSeq (protein)	NP_001007238; NP_001533	NP_997088; NP_001391335; NP_001391336; NP_001391337
Location (UCSC)	Chr 1: 116.57 – 116.67 Mb	Chr 3: 101.28 – 101.37 Mb
PubMed search
- Wikidata
View/Edit Human	View/Edit Mouse

Immunoglobulin superfamily member 3 is a protein that in humans is encoded by the IGSF3 gene.

== Function ==
The protein encoded by this gene is an immunoglobulin-like membrane protein containing several V-type Ig-like domains. A mutation in this gene has been associated with bilateral nasolacrimal duct obstruction (LCDD). [provided by RefSeq, Jun 2016].
