= GPA33 =

Protein-coding gene in humans

Identifiers
- Aliases: GPA33, A33, glycoprotein A33
- External IDs: OMIM: 602171; MGI: 1891703; GeneCards: GPA33

Gene location (Human)
Chr.	Chromosome 1 (human)
Band	1q24.1	Start	167,052,836 bp
Band	1q24.1	End	167,166,479 bp

Gene location (Mouse)
Chr.	Chromosome 1 (mouse)
Band	1 H2.3|1 73.49 cM	Start	165,957,807 bp
Band	1 H2.3|1 73.49 cM	End	165,994,079 bp
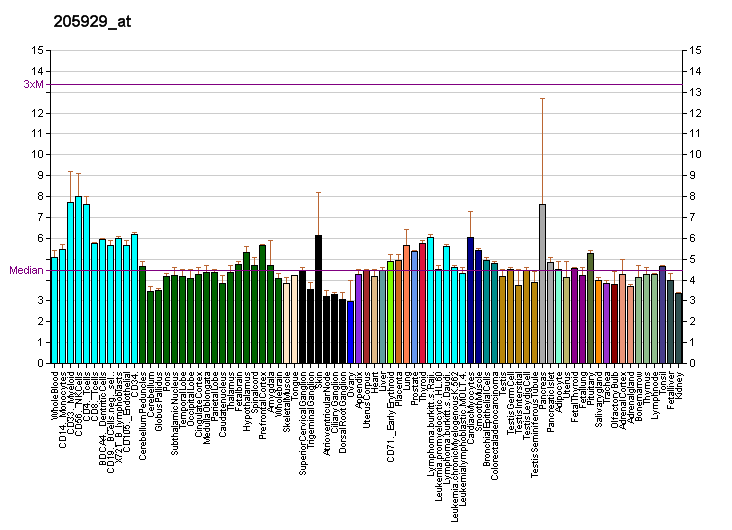
RNA expression pattern
Bgee	Human / Mouse (ortholog); Top expressed in: mucosa of ileum; mucosa of transverse colon; rectum; jejunal mucosa; mucosa of sigmoid colon; duodenum; appendix; epithelium of colon; granulocyte; blood / Top expressed in: intestinal villus; left colon; crypt of lieberkuhn of small intestine; jejunum; basilar part of occipital bone; duodenum; ileum; transitional epithelium of urinary bladder; humerus; Meckel's cartilage; More reference expression data
BioGPS	More reference expression data
Orthologs
Databases	NCBI: entry; OMA: entry
Species	Human	Mouse
Entrez	10223	59290
Ensembl	ENSG00000143167	ENSMUSG00000000544
UniProt	Q99795	Q9JKA5
RefSeq (mRNA)	NM_005814	NM_021610; NM_001360925; NM_001360926
RefSeq (protein)	NP_005805	NP_067623; NP_001347854; NP_001347855
Location (UCSC)	Chr 1: 167.05 – 167.17 Mb	Chr 1: 165.96 – 165.99 Mb
PubMed search
- Wikidata
View/Edit Human	View/Edit Mouse

Cell surface A33 antigen is a protein that in humans is encoded by the GPA33 gene.

The glycoprotein encoded by this gene is a cell surface antigen that is expressed in greater than 95% of human colon cancers. The open reading frame encodes a 319-amino acid polypeptide having a putative secretory signal sequence and 3 potential glycosylation sites. The predicted mature protein has a 213-amino acid extracellular region, a single transmembrane domain, and a 62-amino acid intracellular tail. The sequence of the extracellular region contains 2 domains characteristic of the CD2 subgroup of the immunoglobulin (Ig) superfamily.
