= MINAR1 =

Protein-coding gene in the species Homo sapiens

Identifiers
- Aliases: MINAR1, membrane integral NOTCH2 associated receptor 1, KIAA1024, UBTOR
- External IDs: OMIM: 618054; MGI: 2667167; HomoloGene: 17782; GeneCards: MINAR1; OMA:MINAR1 - orthologs

Gene location (Human)
Chr.	Chromosome 15 (human)
Band	15q25.1	Start	79,432,336 bp
Band	15q25.1	End	79,472,304 bp

Gene location (Mouse)
Chr.	Chromosome 9 (mouse)
Band	9|9 E3.1	Start	89,469,269 bp
Band	9|9 E3.1	End	89,505,178 bp
RNA expression pattern
Bgee	Human / Mouse (ortholog); Top expressed in: right adrenal cortex; left adrenal gland; left adrenal cortex; cerebellar cortex; cerebellar hemisphere; right hemisphere of cerebellum; endothelial cell; testicle; cerebellar vermis; buccal mucosa cell / Top expressed in: habenula; lumbar spinal ganglion; substantia nigra; medial vestibular nucleus; mammillary body; dorsal tegmental nucleus; pontine nuclei; ventral tegmental area; facial motor nucleus; lateral hypothalamus; More reference expression data
BioGPS	n/a
Gene ontology
Molecular function	protein binding
Cellular component	membrane; integral component of membrane; plasma membrane
Biological process	negative regulation of cell population proliferation; negative regulation of angiogenesis; angiogenesis; negative regulation of neuron projection development; negative regulation of cell growth; negative regulation of protein ubiquitination; negative regulation of TOR signaling
Sources:Amigo / QuickGO
Orthologs
Species	Human	Mouse
Entrez	23251	209743
Ensembl	ENSG00000169330	ENSMUSG00000039313
UniProt	Q9UPX6	Q8K3V7
RefSeq (mRNA)	NM_015206	NM_153509
RefSeq (protein)	NP_056021	NP_705729
Location (UCSC)	Chr 15: 79.43 – 79.47 Mb	Chr 9: 89.47 – 89.51 Mb
PubMed search
- Wikidata
View/Edit Human	View/Edit Mouse

Major intrinsically disordered Notch2-binding receptor 1 is a protein that in humans is encoded by the MINAR1 gene (previously KIAA1024). The MINAR1 protein regulates and inhibits mTOR signaling by stabilizing DEPTOR, an mTOR complex component. A notable homolog is MINAR2, which is sometimes called “major intrinsically disordered Notch2-binding receptor 1-like”.
