= FCGR3B =

Protein-coding gene in humans

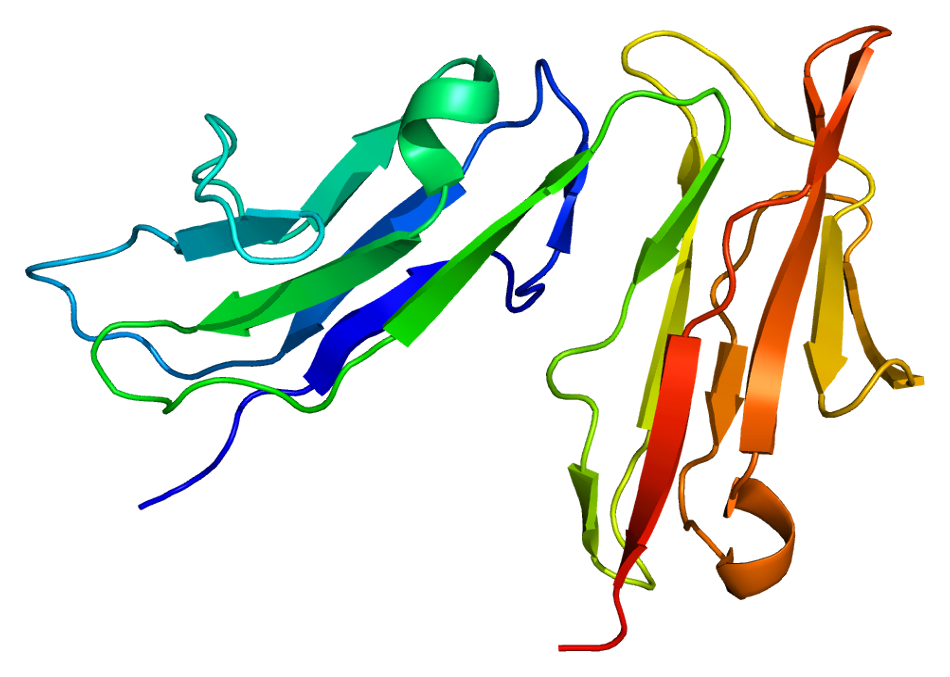

Identifiers
- Aliases: FCGR3B, CD16, CD16b, FCG3, FCGR3, FCR-10, FCRIII, FCRIIIb, Fc fragment of IgG receptor IIIb, CD16A, FCGR3A, Fc gamma receptor IIIb, CD16-I
- External IDs: OMIM: 610665; MGI: 2179523; GeneCards: FCGR3B
Available structures
PDB	Ortholog search: PDBe RCSB
PDB	List of PDB id codes 1E4J, 1E4K, 1FNL, 1T83, 1T89

Gene location (Human)
Chr.	Chromosome 1 (human)
Band	1q23.3	Start	161,623,196 bp
Band	1q23.3	End	161,631,963 bp

Gene location (Mouse)
Chr.	Chromosome 1 (mouse)
Band	1 H3|1 78.53 cM	Start	170,846,489 bp
Band	1 H3|1 78.53 cM	End	170,857,330 bp
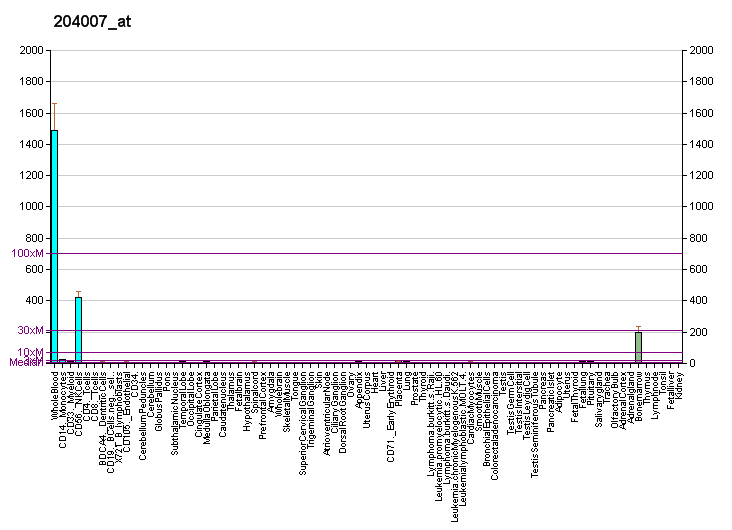

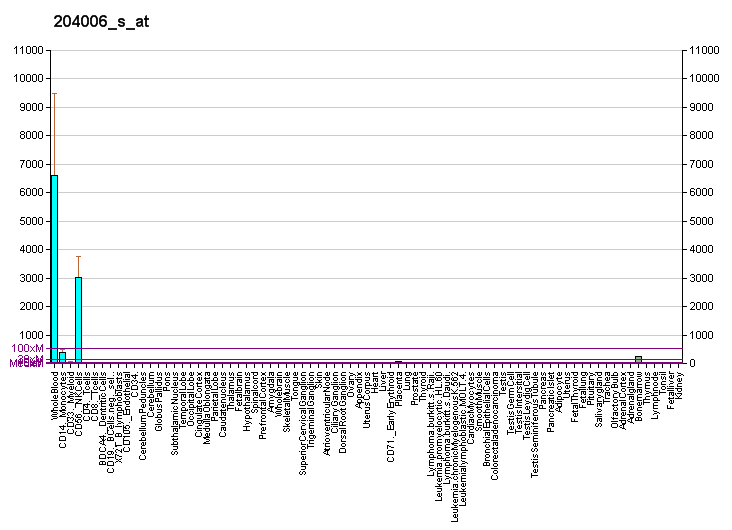
RNA expression pattern
Bgee	Human / Mouse (ortholog); Top expressed in: blood; periodontal fiber; trabecular bone; granulocyte; spleen; bone marrow; palpebral conjunctiva; bone marrow cell; germinal epithelium; right lung / Top expressed in: granulocyte; ileum; jejunum; spleen; liver; ovary; secondary oocyte; bone marrow; adrenal gland; embryo; More reference expression data
BioGPS	More reference expression data
Gene ontology
Molecular function	IgG binding
Cellular component	anchored component of membrane; extracellular exosome; membrane; extracellular region; plasma membrane; secretory granule membrane
Biological process	immune response; C-terminal protein lipidation; neutrophil degranulation
Sources:Amigo / QuickGO
Orthologs
Databases	NCBI: entry; OMA: entry
Species	Human	Mouse
Entrez	2215	246256
Ensembl	ENSG00000162747	ENSMUSG00000059089
UniProt	O75015	A0A0B4J1G0
RefSeq (mRNA)	NM_001271037; NM_000570; NM_001244753; NM_001271035; NM_001271036	NM_144559; NM_180961
RefSeq (protein)	NP_000561; NP_001231682; NP_001257964; NP_001257965; NP_001257966	NP_653142
Location (UCSC)	Chr 1: 161.62 – 161.63 Mb	Chr 1: 170.85 – 170.86 Mb
PubMed search
- Wikidata
View/Edit Human	View/Edit Mouse

FCGR3B (Fc fragment of IgG, low affinity IIIb, receptor), also known as CD16b (Cluster of Differentiation 16b), is a human gene.

== Clinical relevance ==
Mutations and copy-number variations in this gene have been associated to clinical cases of glomerulonephritis.

== See also ==
- CD16
- Cluster of differentiation
