= IL1RAPL2 =

Protein-coding gene in the species Homo sapiens

Identifiers
- Aliases: IL1RAPL2, IL-1R9, IL1R9, IL1RAPL-2, TIGIRR-1, interleukin 1 receptor accessory protein like 2
- External IDs: OMIM: 300277; MGI: 1913106; GeneCards: IL1RAPL2
Enzyme activity
EC #	BRENDA	ExPASy	KEGG	MetaCyc
3.2.2.6	↗	↗	↗	↗

Gene location (Human)
Chr.	X chromosome (human)
Band	Xq22.3	Start	104,566,199 bp
Band	Xq22.3	End	105,767,829 bp

Gene location (Mouse)
Chr.	X chromosome (mouse)
Band	X|X F1	Start	136,471,357 bp
Band	X|X F1	End	137,747,695 bp
RNA expression pattern
Bgee	Human / Mouse (ortholog); Top expressed in: testicle; gonad; prefrontal cortex; right lobe of liver; skin of hip; Brodmann area 9; placenta; urinary bladder; gallbladder; primary visual cortex / Top expressed in: multiform layer of neocortex; internal granular layer; Purkinje cell; external pyramidal layer of neocortex; embryo; internal pyramidal layer of neocortex; barrel cortex; primary visual cortex; median eminence; superior frontal gyrus; More reference expression data
BioGPS	n/a
Gene ontology
Molecular function	interleukin-1, type II, blocking receptor activity; interleukin-1 receptor activity
Cellular component	integral component of membrane; membrane; plasma membrane; glutamatergic synapse
Biological process	central nervous system development; signal transduction; cytokine-mediated signaling pathway; regulation of presynapse assembly
Sources:Amigo / QuickGO
Orthologs
Databases	NCBI: entry; OMA: entry
Species	Human	Mouse
Entrez	26280	60367
Ensembl	ENSG00000189108	ENSMUSG00000059203
UniProt	Q9NP60	Q9ERS6
RefSeq (mRNA)	NM_017416	NM_030688
RefSeq (protein)	NP_059112	NP_109613
Location (UCSC)	Chr X: 104.57 – 105.77 Mb	Chr X: 136.47 – 137.75 Mb
PubMed search
- Wikidata
View/Edit Human	View/Edit Mouse

X-linked interleukin-1 receptor accessory protein-like 2 is a protein that in humans is encoded by the IL1RAPL2 gene.

The protein encoded by this gene is a member of the interleukin 1 receptor family. This protein is similar to the interleukin 1 accessory proteins, and is most closely related to interleukin 1 receptor accessory protein-like 1 (IL1RAPL1). This gene and IL1RAPL1 are located at a region on chromosome X that is associated with X-linked non-syndromic intellectual disability.
