= FCGR1A =

Protein-coding gene in humans

Identifiers
- Aliases: FCGR1A, CD64, CD64A, FCRI, IGFR1, Fc fragment of IgG receptor Ia
- External IDs: OMIM: 146760; MGI: 95498; GeneCards: FCGR1A
Available structures
PDB	Ortholog search: PDBe RCSB
PDB	List of PDB id codes 4W4O, 4X4M, 4ZNE

Gene location (Human)
Chr.	Chromosome 1 (human)
Band	1q21.2	Start	149,782,671 bp
Band	1q21.2	End	149,792,518 bp

Gene location (Mouse)
Chr.	Chromosome 3 (mouse)
Band	3 F2.1|3 41.72 cM	Start	96,190,225 bp
Band	3 F2.1|3 41.72 cM	End	96,201,285 bp
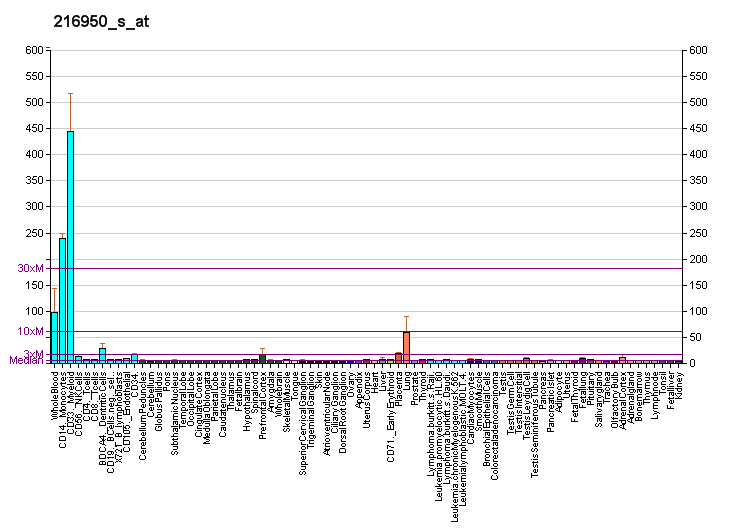

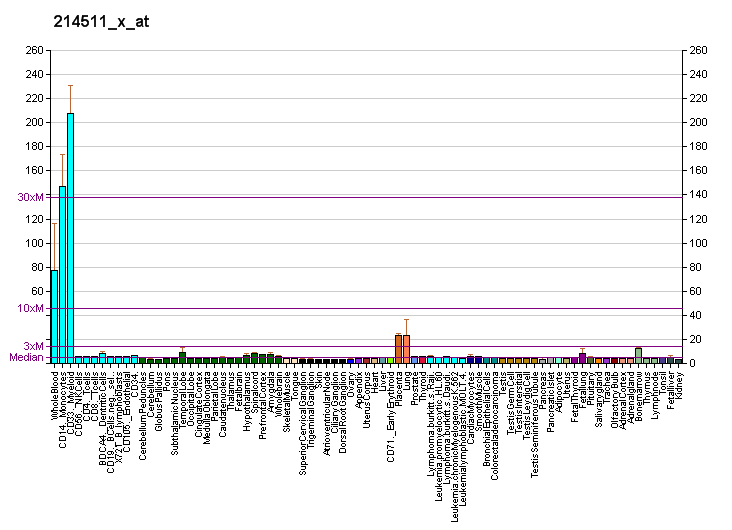
RNA expression pattern
Bgee	Human / Mouse (ortholog); Top expressed in: monocyte; granulocyte; blood; placenta; right coronary artery; appendix; C1 segment; substantia nigra; testicle; bone marrow / Top expressed in: stroma of bone marrow; lumbar subsegment of spinal cord; calvaria; interventricular septum; spleen; CA3 field; embryo; granulocyte; dermis; mesenteric lymph nodes; More reference expression data
BioGPS	More reference expression data
Gene ontology
Molecular function	protein binding; IgG binding
Cellular component	integral component of membrane; clathrin-coated endocytic vesicle membrane; early endosome membrane; membrane; plasma membrane
Biological process	immune system process; phagocytosis, engulfment; antigen processing and presentation of exogenous peptide antigen via MHC class I, TAP-dependent; immune response; Fc-gamma receptor signaling pathway involved in phagocytosis; signal transduction; regulation of immune response; interferon-gamma-mediated signaling pathway; receptor-mediated endocytosis; innate immune response; positive regulation of protein tyrosine kinase activity
Sources:Amigo / QuickGO
Orthologs
Databases	NCBI: entry; OMA: entry
Species	Human	Mouse
Entrez	2209	14129
Ensembl	ENSG00000150337	ENSMUSG00000015947
UniProt	P12314	P26151
RefSeq (mRNA)	NM_000566	NM_010186
RefSeq (protein)	NP_000557; NP_001365733; NP_001365734; NP_001365735; NP_001365736 NP_001365737; NP_001365738; NP_001365739; NP_001365740	NP_034316
Location (UCSC)	Chr 1: 149.78 – 149.79 Mb	Chr 3: 96.19 – 96.2 Mb
PubMed search
- Wikidata
View/Edit Human	View/Edit Mouse

High affinity immunoglobulin gamma Fc receptor I is a protein that in humans is encoded by the FCGR1A gene.

== Interactions ==
The FcgRI binds the Fc portion of IgG and causes activation of the host cell via an intercellular ITAM motif.
