= IGSF2 =

Human gene

CD101

Identifiers
- Aliases: CD101, EWI-101, IGSF2, V7, CD101 molecule
- External IDs: OMIM: 604516; MGI: 2685862; GeneCards: CD101

Gene location (Human)
Chr.	Chromosome 1 (human)
Band	1p13.1	Start	117,001,750 bp
Band	1p13.1	End	117,036,552 bp

Gene location (Mouse)
Chr.	Chromosome 3 (mouse)
Band	3|3 F2.2	Start	100,900,845 bp
Band	3|3 F2.2	End	100,936,872 bp
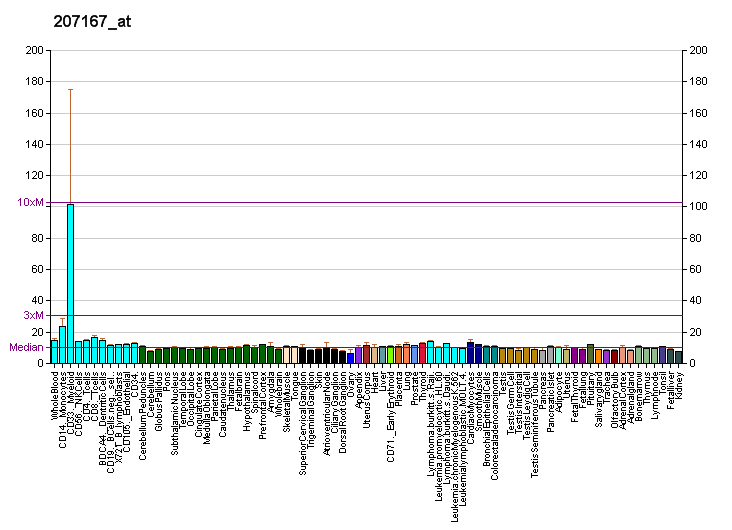
RNA expression pattern
Bgee	Human / Mouse (ortholog); Top expressed in: monocyte; granulocyte; testicle; right lung; mucosa of transverse colon; bone marrow cell; ventricular zone; upper lobe of left lung; blood; rectum / Top expressed in: granulocyte; morula; jejunum; duodenum; muscle of thigh; bone marrow; ileum; lung; colon; thymus; More reference expression data
BioGPS	More reference expression data
Gene ontology
Molecular function	hydrolase activity, acting on carbon-nitrogen (but not peptide) bonds, in cyclic amides
Cellular component	plasma membrane; extracellular exosome; membrane; integral component of membrane
Biological process	cell surface receptor signaling pathway; positive regulation of myeloid leukocyte differentiation
Sources:Amigo / QuickGO
Orthologs
Databases	NCBI: entry; OMA: entry
Species	Human	Mouse
Entrez	9398	630146
Ensembl	ENSG00000134256	ENSMUSG00000086564
UniProt	Q93033	A8E0Y8
RefSeq (mRNA)	NM_001256106; NM_001256109; NM_001256111; NM_004258	NM_001099332; NM_001167906
RefSeq (protein)	NP_001243035; NP_001243038; NP_001243040; NP_004249	NP_001161378
Location (UCSC)	Chr 1: 117 – 117.04 Mb	Chr 3: 100.9 – 100.94 Mb
PubMed search
- Wikidata
View/Edit Human	View/Edit Mouse

Immunoglobulin superfamily, member 2 (IGSF2) also known as CD101 (Cluster of Differentiation 101), is a human gene.

== See also ==
- Cluster of differentiation
