= Immunological synapse =

Interface between lymphocyte and target cell

Immunological synapse between Jurkat T cell expressing GFP-actin (green) and Raji B cell stained with CMAC (blue). Synapse formation was induced by Staphylococcal enterotoxin E superantigen.

In immunology, an immunological synapse (or immune synapse) is the interface between an antigen-presenting cell or target cell and a lymphocyte such as a T cell, B cell, or natural killer cell. The interface was originally named after the neuronal synapse, with which it shares the main structural pattern. An immunological synapse consists of molecules involved in T cell activation, which compose typical patterns—activation clusters. Immunological synapses are the subject of much ongoing research.

== Structure and function ==
The immune synapse is also known as the supramolecular activation cluster or SMAC. This structure is composed of concentric rings each containing segregated clusters of proteins—often referred to as the bull's-eye model of the immunological synapse:

- c-SMAC (central-SMAC) composed of the θ isoform of protein kinase C, CD2, CD4, CD8, CD28, Lck, and Fyn.
- p-SMAC (peripheral-SMAC) within which the lymphocyte function-associated antigen-1 (LFA-1) and the cytoskeletal protein talin are clustered.
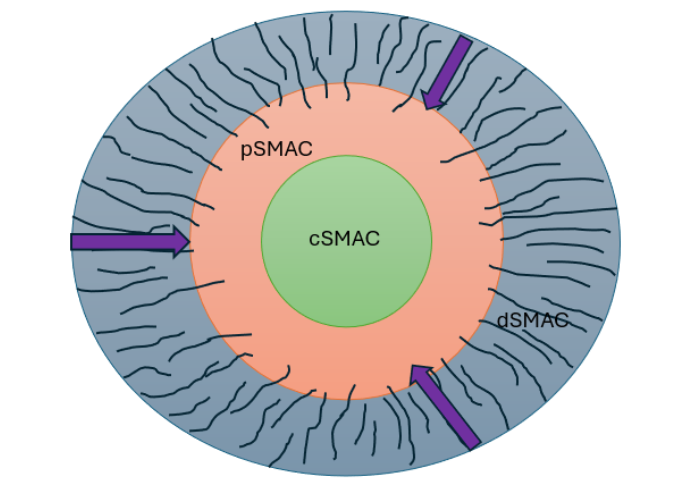
- A depiction of the "bull's eye" model of the supramolecular attack cluster (SMAC) with labelled concentric sections. Arrows indicate the direction of actin flow and the wavy lines represent actin filaments.
  d-SMAC (distal-SMAC) enriched in CD43 and CD45 molecules.

New investigations, however, have shown that a "bull’s eye" is not present in all immunological synapses. For example, different patterns appear in the synapse between a T-cell and a dendritic cell.

This complex as a whole is postulated to have several functions including but not limited to:

- Regulation of lymphocyte activation
- Transfer of peptide-MHC complexes from APCs to lymphocytes
- Directing secretion of cytokines or lytic granules

Recent research has proposed a striking parallel between the immunological synapse and the primary cilium based mainly on similar actin rearrangement, orientation of the centrosome towards the structure and involvement of similar transport molecules (such as IFT20, Rab8, Rab11). This structural and functional homology is the topic of ongoing research.

== Formation ==
The initial interaction occurs between LFA-1 present in the p-SMAC of a T-cell, and non-specific adhesion molecules (such as ICAM-1 or ICAM-2) on a target cell. When bound to a target cell, the T-cell can extend pseudopodia and scan the surface of target cell to find a specific peptide:MHC complex.

The process of formation begins when the T-cell receptor (TCR) binds to the peptide:MHC complex on the antigen-presenting cell and initiates signaling activation through formation of microclusters/lipid rafts. Specific signaling pathways lead to polarization of the T-cell by orienting its centrosome toward the site of the immunological synapse. The symmetric centripetal actin flow is the basis of formation of the p-SMAC ring. The accumulation and polarization of actin is triggered by TCR/CD3 interactions with integrins and small GTPases (such as Rac1 or Cdc42). These interactions activate large multi-molecular complexes (containing WAVE (Scar), HSP300, ABL2, SRA1, and NAP1 and others) to associate with Arp2/3, which directly promotes actin polymerization. As actin is accumulated and reorganized, it promotes clustering of TCRs and integrins. The process thereby upregulates itself via positive feedback.

Some parts of this process may differ in CD4+ and CD8+ cells. For example, synapse formation is quick in CD8+ T cells, because for CD8+ T cells it is fundamental to eliminate the pathogen quickly. In CD4+ T cells, however, the whole process of the immunological synapse formation can take up to 6 hours.

In CD8+ T cells, the synapse formation leads to killing of the target cell via secretion of cytolytic enzymes. CD8+ T lymphocytes contain lytic granules – specialized secretory lysosomes filled with perforin, granzymes, lysosomal hydrolases (for example cathepsins B and D, β-hexosaminidase) and other cytolytic effector proteins. Once these proteins are delivered to the target cell, they induce its apoptosis. The effectivity of killing of the target cell depends on the strength of the TCR signal. Even after receiving weak or short-lived signals, the MTOC polarizes towards the immunological synapse, but in that case the lytic granules are not trafficked and therefore the killing effect is missing or poor.

== The immunological synapse between different cell types ==
More than just the junction between killer cells and infected or cancerous cells, the immunological synapse (IS) is the junction that forms between all immune cells when they communicate between each other, and their targets. Immune cells communicate to each other through the IS and specialized killing cells, such as Natural Killer cells (NK cells) and Cytotoxic T-lymphocytes (CTL's), form immunological synapses with the cells they kill. The IS is a dynamic location on immune cells that forms in response to a receptor signal and then functions to amplify that signal to either to induce apoptosis in targeted cells in the case of killer cells, or to transduce an activation or inhibition signal in the case of immune cells communicating to each other. An immune cell can be capable of forming a presynaptic IS where the immune cell is sending a signal, a postsynaptic IS where the cell is receiving a signal from another immune cell, or both. The following chart outlines the kinds and functions of IS that different immune cells can form. The IS itself is a highly organized structure consisting of various adhesion and receptor proteins that are arranged into specific activation clusters.

Immunological Synapses
Immune Cell	Types of IS Formed	Function
Dendritic cell (DC)	Presynaptic	Collects antigens and presents them to T and B cells to initiate the adaptive immune response.
B cell	Postsynaptic	Activated by DC, releases antibodies for specific target antigen.
Macrophage	Both	Activated by DC's, activates T cells, and phagocytoses targets (opsonized cells).
Cytotoxic T cell	Both	Activated by DC, binds to and kills target cells expressing a specific target antigen.
T helper cell	Both	Activated by DC and helps to activate other immune cells through IS formation and cytokine release.
Regulatory T cell	Both	Activated by DC. Transduces inhibitory signals to immune cells to reduce the immune response.
Natural killer cell	Presynaptic	Detects and kills abnormal cells.

== NK-cell synapse ==
NK cells are known to form synapses with cytolytic effect towards the target cell. In the initiation step, NK cell approaches the target cell, either accidentally or intentionally due to the chemotactic signalling. Firstly, the sialyl Lewis X present on the surface of target cell is recognized by CD2 on NK cell. If the KIR receptors of NK cell find their cognate antigen on the surface of target cell, formation of the lytic synapse is inhibited. If such signal is missing, a tight adhesion via LFA1 and MAC1 is promoted and enhanced by additional signals such as CD226-ligand and CD96-CD155 interactions.

Lytic granules are secretory organelles filled with perforin, granzymes and other cytolytic enzymes. After initiation of the cell-cell contact, the lytic granules of NK cells move around the microtubules towards the centrosome, which also relocalizes towards the site of synapse. Then, the contents of lytic granules is released and via vesicles with SNARE proteins transferred to the target cell.

Inhibitory immunological synapse of NK cells

When an NK cell encounters a self cell, it forms a so-called inhibitory immunological synapse to prevent unwanted cytolysis of target cell. In this process, the killer-cell immunoglobulin-like receptors (KIRs) containing long cytoplasmic tails with immunoreceptor tyrosine-based inhibitory motifs (ITIMs) are clustered in the site of synapse, bind their ligand on the surface of target cell and form the supramolecular inhibitory cluster (SMIC). SMIC then acts to prevent rearrangement of actin, block the recruitment of activatory receptors to the site of synapse and finally, promote detachment from the target cell. This process is essential in protecting NK cells from killing self cells.

== Mechanical/physical properties of the immunological synapse ==
Immune cell antigen receptors, such as B cell receptors (BCR) and T cell receptors (TCR), in addition to detecting antigen binding, also function as mechanoreceptors. After the formation of an IS following antigen receptor binding, cytoskeletal remodeling at the IS induces push, pull, and shear forces on the antigen receptor, amplifying the signal of the antigen receptor through mechanotransduction. When TCR's and BCR's are bound to an antigen with high affinity, their bond strength will increase under tension up to a critical point.. It is speculated that this force application at the antigen receptor functions to enhance the discriminatory power of antigen receptors, as any bound antigen without sufficient affinity will be pulled loose, effectively deactivating the immune cell response. This extra level of antigen filtering can help prevent unintentional activation of immune cells. Another application of force by IS is in the case of killer cells, where the IS exerts stretching forces on the surface of target cells. These stretching forces pull the target membrane tight, allowing perforin to more easily insert into the membrane and initiate the extrinsic apoptotic pathway.

== Therapeutic applications ==
It has been shown that target membrane stiffness can influence the effectiveness of immune cells. One of the functions of the IS is to exert forces upon antigen receptors to stimulate an immune response, and tests have shown that when the IS interacts with stiffer antigen presenting membranes more a more robust immune response is induced than with softer membranes. The softening of the outer membrane has also been shown to be a way that tumor cells evade detection by the immune system. Using this mechanical principle, we can develop drugs that stiffen cell membranes by inducing actin polymerization and deliver these drugs using precision medicine methods or just to the general region of a tumor. One key benefit of this is that the drug would have minor adverse effects on healthy tissues as they would not be targeted by T-cells, but this drug would increase the effectiveness of the IS in binding to tumor tissue and initiating an apoptotic immune response. This method is limited in use to soft-tissue cancer, but this is only one of many ways in which we can utilize the properties of the immunological synapse to treat diseases.

== History ==
Immunological synapses were first discovered by Abraham Kupfer at the National Jewish Medical and Research Center in Denver. Their name was coined by Michael Dustin at NYU who studied them in further detail. Daniel M. Davis and Jack Strominger showed structured immune synapses for a different lymphocyte, the Natural Killer cell, and published this around the same time. Abraham Kupfer first presented his findings during a Keystone Symposia in 1995, when he showed three-dimensional images of immune cells interacting with one another. Key molecules in the synapse are the T cell receptor and its counterpart the major histocompatibility complex (MHC). Also important are LFA-1, ICAM-1, CD28, and CD80/CD86.
