= CD226 =

Protein found in humans

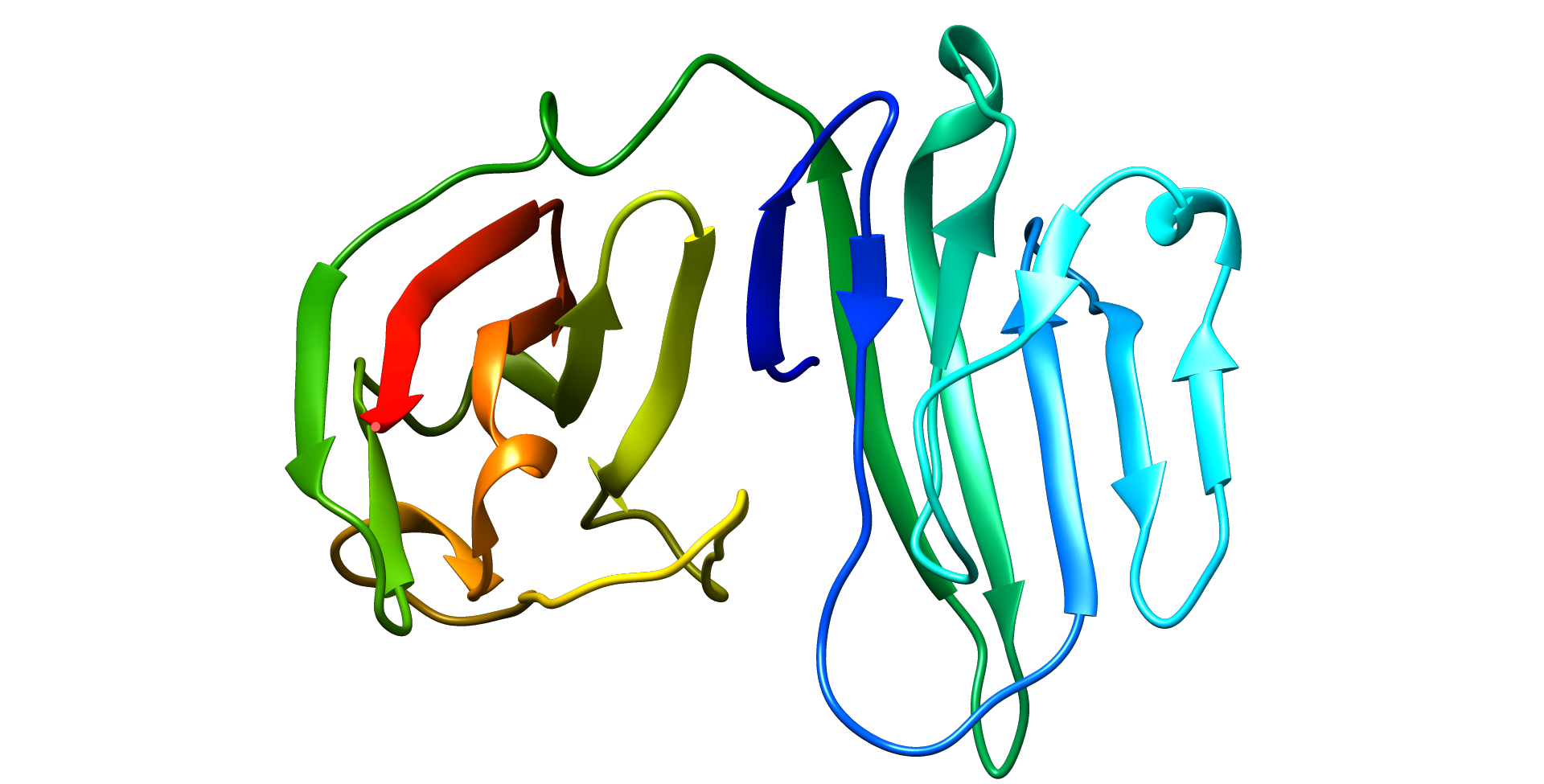

Identifiers
- Aliases: CD226, DNAM-1, DNAM1, PTA1, TLiSA1, CD226 molecule
- External IDs: OMIM: 605397; MGI: 3039602; GeneCards: CD226
Available structures
PDB	Ortholog search: PDBe RCSB
PDB	List of PDB id codes 6ISA, 6ISC, 6ISB, 6O3O

Gene location (Human)
Chr.	Chromosome 18 (human)
Band	18q22.2	Start	69,831,158 bp
Band	18q22.2	End	69,961,803 bp

Gene location (Mouse)
Chr.	Chromosome 18 (mouse)
Band	18|18 E4	Start	89,195,091 bp
Band	18|18 E4	End	89,290,353 bp
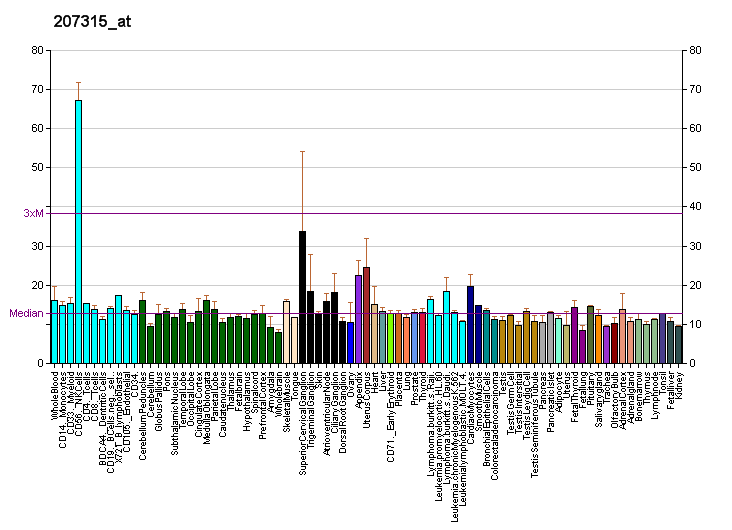
RNA expression pattern
Bgee	Human / Mouse (ortholog); Top expressed in: monocyte; granulocyte; blood; lymph node; gonad; testicle; spleen; appendix; sural nerve; epithelium of colon / Top expressed in: blood; zygote; spleen; thymus; mesenteric lymph nodes; embryo; bone marrow; secondary oocyte; subcutaneous adipose tissue; esophagus; More reference expression data
BioGPS	More reference expression data
Gene ontology
Molecular function	protein homodimerization activity; protein binding; protein kinase binding; integrin binding; cell adhesion molecule binding
Cellular component	integral component of plasma membrane; membrane raft; integral component of membrane; membrane; cell surface; external side of plasma membrane; plasma membrane
Biological process	positive regulation of natural killer cell mediated cytotoxicity directed against tumor cell target; cell adhesion; regulation of immune response; heterophilic cell-cell adhesion via plasma membrane cell adhesion molecules; homophilic cell adhesion via plasma membrane adhesion molecules; positive regulation of Fc receptor mediated stimulatory signaling pathway; cell recognition; cytokine production; positive regulation of immunoglobulin mediated immune response; signal transduction; positive regulation of natural killer cell mediated cytotoxicity; positive regulation of mast cell activation; positive regulation of interferon-gamma production; positive regulation of natural killer cell cytokine production; positive regulation of T cell receptor signaling pathway
Sources:Amigo / QuickGO
Orthologs
Databases	NCBI: entry; OMA: entry
Species	Human	Mouse
Entrez	10666	225825
Ensembl	ENSG00000150637	ENSMUSG00000034028
UniProt	Q15762	Q8K4F0
RefSeq (mRNA)	NM_001303618; NM_001303619; NM_006566	NM_001039148; NM_001039149; NM_178687
RefSeq (protein)	NP_001290547; NP_001290548; NP_006557	NP_001034238; NP_848802
Location (UCSC)	Chr 18: 69.83 – 69.96 Mb	Chr 18: 89.2 – 89.29 Mb
PubMed search
- Wikidata
View/Edit Human	View/Edit Mouse

CD226 (Cluster of Differentiation 226), PTA1 (outdated term, 'platelet and T cell activation antigen 1') or DNAM-1 (DNAX Accessory Molecule-1) is a ~65 kDa immunoglobulin-like transmembrane glycoprotein expressed on the surface of natural killer cells, NK T cell, B cells, dendritic cells, hematopoietic precursor cells, platelets, monocytes and T cells.

DNAM-1 gene CD226 is conserved between human and mice. In humans the CD226 gene is located on chromosome 18q22.3. In mice the CD226 gene is located on chromosome 18E4.

== Structure ==
DNAM-1 is composed of three domains: an extracellular domain of 230 amino acids with two immunoglobin-like V-set domains and eight N-glycosylation sites, a transmembrane domain of 28 amino acids and a cytosolic domain of 60 amino acids containing four putative tyrosine residues and one serine residue for phosphorylation.

== Signaling ==
Upon engagement to its ligand, DNAM-1 is phosphorylated by protein kinase C. Then adhesive molecule LFA-1 crosslinks with DNAM-1 that results in recruitment of DNAM-1 to lipid rafts and promotes association with actin cytoskeleton. Cross-linking with LFA-1 also induce phosphorylation on Tyr^{128} and Tyr^{113} by Fyn Src kinase.

DNAM-1 and CD244 together promotes phosphorylation of SH2 domain of SLP-76. This leads to activation of phospholipase Cγ2, Ca^{2+} influx, cytoskeletal reorganization, degranulation, and secretion.

== Function ==
DNAM-1 mediates cellular adhesion to other cells bearing its ligands, nectin molecule CD112 and nectin-like protein CD155, that are broadly distributed on normal neuronal, epithelial, fibroblastic cells, dendritic cells, monocytes and on infected or transformed cells.

DNAM-1 promotes lymphocyte signaling, lymphokine secretion and cytotoxicity of NK cells and cytotoxic CD8+ T lymphocytes. Cross-linking of DNAM-1 with antibodies causes cellular activation.

DNAM-1 participates on platelets activation and aggregation.

DNAM-1 possibly plays a role in trans-endothelial migration of NK cells because it was shown that monoclonal antibodies against DNAM-1 or CD155 inhibit this process.

DNAM-1 interaction with its ligands promotes killing of immature and mature dendritic cells, is involved in the crosstalk between NK cells and T lymphocytes and can lyse activated T lymphocytes during graft versus host disease (GvHD).

DNAM-1 also participates in the immunological synapse where is colocalized with LFA-1.

== DNAM-1 regulation ==
DNAM-1 expression on NK cells can be regulated by cell-cell interaction and by soluble factors. In human, IL-2 and IL-15 up-regulate DNAM-1 expression, whereas TGF-β, indolamine 2,3-dioxygenase and chronic exposure to CD155 can down-regulate DNAM-1 expression on NK cells.

== DNAM-1 and NK cells ==
DNAM is involved in NK cell education, differentiation, cytokine production and immune synapse formation. DNAM-1 exerts synergistic roles in NK cells regulation with three molecules that are TIGIT, CD96 and CRTAM.

Cytotoxic response of NK cells might require synergistic activation from specific pairs of receptors. DNAM-1 could synergize with SLAM family member 2B4 (CD244) or with other receptors to induce full NK cell activation.

== DNAM-1 in cancer ==
The role of DNAM-1 in tumor environment was firstly described in vivo using RMA lymphoma model. In this model, enforced expression of DNAM-1 ligands CD155 and CD112 increased tumor rejection. CD155 and CD112 are expressed on the surface of a wide number of tumor cells in solid and lymphoid malignances such as lung carcinoma, primary human leukemia, myeloma, melanoma, neuroblastoma, ovarian cancer, colorectal carcinoma, and Ewing sarcoma cells.

The role of DNAM-1 in the killing of tumor cells was supported with DNAM-/- mice model that was more susceptible to formation of spontaneous fibrosarcoma.

It was shown that NK cells can kill leukemia and neuroblastoma cells expressing CD155 and block of CD155 or DNAM-1 results in inhibition of tumor cells lysis.

In vivo, tumor cells are capable of evading DNAM-1 tumor suppressing mechanisms. Tumor cells can downregulate CD155 or CD112 to disable recognition of these DNAM-1 ligands. The other mechanism is a downregulation of DNAM-1 from the effector NK cell surface due to the chronic ligand (CD155) exposure.

DNAM-1 was also used in T lymphocytes with a chimeric antigen receptors (CAR) for the treatment of cancer.

== DNAM-1 and infections ==
DNAM-1 has a relevant role in the process of recognizing virus-infected cells during early infection for example in case of cytomegalovirus infection by NK cells. DNAM-1 ligands are also expressed in antigen-presenting cells activated by toll-like receptors and CD155 might be activated by DNA-damage response as was demonstrated for human immunodeficiency virus (HIV).

DNAM-1 functionality during infections may be impaired by viral immune evasion mechanisms. Viruses can downregulate production of surface CD112 and CD155 and thus avoid recognition of DNAM-1 expressed on NK cells. The other way is downregulation of DNAM-1 expressions that may occur during chronic infections.

NK cells activated with interferon α can kill HCV-infected cells in a DNAM-1 dependent manner.

During the bacterial infection interaction between DNAM-1 and its ligands helps to mediate the migration of leukocytes from the blood to secondary lymphoid organs or into inflamed tissues.

== Soluble DNAM-1 ==
It is suggested that soluble DNAM-1 is a prognostic marker in some types of cancer and in graft-versus-host-disease and that soluble DNAM-1 might play role in pathogenesis of some autoimmune diseases such as systemic lupus erythematosus, systemic sclerosis and rheumatoid arthritis.

== See also ==
- Cluster of differentiation
- Nectin
