= Microchimerism =

Presence of cells originating from another individual

During pregnancy, a two-way traffic of immune cells may occur through the placenta. Exchanged cells can multiply and establish long-lasting cell lines that are immunologically active even decades after giving birth.

Microchimerism is the presence of a small number of cells in an individual that have originated from another individual and are therefore genetically distinct. This phenomenon may be related to certain types of autoimmune diseases although the responsible mechanisms are unclear. The term comes from the prefix "micro" + "chimerism" based on the hybrid Chimera of Greek mythology. The concept was first discovered in the 1960s with the term gaining usage in the 1970s.

== Types ==
=== Human ===
In humans (and perhaps in all placental mammals), the most common form is fetomaternal microchimerism (also known as fetal cell microchimerism or fetal chimerism) whereby cells from a fetus pass through the placenta and establish cell lineages within the mother. Fetal cells have been documented to persist and multiply in the mother for several decades. The exact phenotype of these cells is unknown, although several different cell types have been identified, such as various immune lineages, mesenchymal stem cells, and placental-derived cells. A 2012 study at the Fred Hutchinson Cancer Research Center, Seattle, has detected cells with the Y chromosome in multiple areas of the brains of deceased women.

Fetomaternal microchimerism occurs during pregnancy and shortly after giving birth for most women. However, not all women who have had children contain fetal cells. Studies suggest that fetomaternal microchimerism could be influenced by killer-cell immunoglobulin-like (KIR) ligands. Lymphocytes also influence the development of persisting fetomaternal microchimerism since natural killer cells compose about 70% of lymphocytes in the first trimester of pregnancy. KIR patterns on maternal natural killer cells of the mother and KIR ligands on the fetal cells could have an effect on fetomaternal microchimerism. In one study, mothers with KIR2DS1 exhibited higher levels of fetomaternal microchimerism compared to mothers who were negative for this activating KIR.

The potential health consequences of these cells are unknown. One hypothesis is that these fetal cells might trigger a graft-versus-host reaction leading to autoimmune disease. This offers a potential explanation for why many autoimmune diseases are more prevalent in middle-aged women. Another hypothesis is that fetal cells come to injured or diseased maternal tissue where they act as stem cells and participate in repair. It is also possible that the fetal cells are merely innocent bystanders and have no effect on maternal health.

After giving birth, about 50–75% of women carry fetal immune cell lines. Maternal immune cells are also found in the offspring yielding in maternal→fetal microchimerism, though this phenomenon is about half as frequent as the former.

Microchimerism had also been shown to exist after blood transfusions to a severely immunocompromised population of patients who suffered trauma.

Other possible sources of microchimerism include gestation, an individual's older sibling, twin sibling, or vanishing twin, with the cells being received in utero. Fetal-maternal microchimerism is especially prevalent after abortion or miscarriage.

=== Animal ===
Microchimerism occurs in most pairs of twins in cattle. In cattle (and other bovines), the placentas of fraternal twins usually fuse and the twins share blood circulation, resulting in exchange of cell lines. If the twins are a male–female pair, then XX/XY microchimerism results, and male hormones partially masculinize the heifer (female), creating a martin heifer or freemartin. Freemartins appear female, but are infertile and so cannot be used for breeding or dairy production. Microchimerism provides a method of diagnosing the condition, because male genetic material can be detected in a blood sample.

== Fetomaternal microchimerism in the brain ==
Several studies have identified male DNA in the brains of female humans and mice who have previously been pregnant with a male fetus. It has been suggested that the fetal-derived cells can differentiate into those capable of presenting immunomarkers on their surface. There has been no strong evidence to say microchimerism of the maternal brain leads to disease; however, Parkinson's disease correlates with a higher incidence of brain microchimeras. Alzheimer's disease studies support nearly the opposite correlation: the more fetal-derived cells present, the lower the chance of the patient having had Alzheimer's.

== Maternal tolerance to paternal-fetal antigens ==
There are many mechanisms at the maternal-fetal interface to prevent immune rejection of fetal cells. Nevertheless, systemic immunological changes occur in pregnant women. For example, condition of women suffering from autoimmune disorders (e.g. rheumatoid arthritis, multiple sclerosis) improves during pregnancy. These changes in immune responses during pregnancy extend to maternal components specific to fetal antigens, because of feto-maternal cell transfer and their retention in mother tissues. During pregnancy, numbers of fetal cells in maternal tissues increase and correlate with expansion of CD4+ regulatory T cells (Tregs). Decreased expansion and decidual accumulation of Treg cause pregnancy complications (preeclampsia, abortions). In mice models, most mother's fetal-specific CD8+ T cells undergo clonal deletion and express low levels of chemokine receptors and ligands – this prevents remaining fetal-specific CD8+ T cells from entering the maternal-fetal interface. Mother's fetal-specific CD4+ T cells proliferate, and due to FOXP3 expression, differentiate into Treg cells. Mice models show that fetal-specific Treg cells are necessary for successful pregnancy.

== Fetal tolerance to noninherited maternal antigens ==
Fetal T cells accumulate during in utero development. Even though the fetus is exposed to noninherited maternal antigens (NIMAs), fetal CD4^{+} T cells are capable of alloantigen-induced proliferation, preferentially differentiating to Treg cells and preventing a fetal immune response to maternal antigens. This expanded immune tolerance persists in both mother and offspring after birth and allows microchimeric cells to be retained in tissues.

== Postnatal tolerance to NIMAs ==
NIMA-specific tolerance causes some interesting immunological phenotypes: sensitization to erythrocyte Rhesus factor (Rh) antigens is reduced among Rh- women born to Rh+ women, long-term kidney allograft survival is improved in NIMA-matched donor-recipient sibling pairs, or acuteness of bone marrow transplantation graft-versus-host disease is reduced, when recipients of donor stem cells are NIMA-matched. Cross-fostering animal studies show that when postnatal NIMA exposure though breastfeeding is eliminated, survival of NIMA-matched allografts is reduced. This suggests that to maintain NIMA-specific tolerance in offspring, breastfeeding is essential, but ingestion of mother's cells alone does not prime NIMA-specific tolerance. Both prenatal and postnatal exposure to mother's cells is required to maintain NIMA-specific tolerance.

== Benefits of microchimeric cells ==
The severity of preexisting autoimmune disorders is reduced during pregnancy and it is most apparent when fetal microchimeric cells levels are highest - during the last trimester. These cells can also replace injured maternal cells and recover tissue function (type I diabetes mouse model showed replacement of defective maternal islet cells by fetal-derived pancreatic cells). Fetal microchimeric cells can differentiate into cell types that infiltrate and replace injured cells in models of Parkinson's disease or myocardial infarction. They also help in wound healing by neoangiogenesis. Seeding of fetal microchimeric cells into maternal tissues has been proposed to promote care of offspring after birth (seeding of maternal breast tissue may promote lactation, and seeding of brain may enhance maternal attention).

== Relationship with autoimmune diseases and breast cancer ==
Microchimerism has been implicated in autoimmune diseases. Independent studies repeatedly suggested that microchimeric cells of fetal origin may be involved in the pathogenesis of systemic sclerosis. Moreover, microchimeric cells of maternal origin may be involved in the pathogenesis of a group of autoimmune diseases found in children, i.e. juvenile idiopathic inflammatory myopathies (one example would be juvenile dermatomyositis). Microchimerism has now been further implicated in other autoimmune diseases, including systemic lupus erythematosus. Contrarily, an alternative hypothesis on the role of microchimeric cells in lesions is that they may be facilitating tissue repair of the damaged organ.

Moreover, fetal immune cells have also been frequently found in breast cancer stroma as compared to samples taken from healthy women. It is not clear, however, whether fetal cell lines promote the development of tumors or, contrarily, protect women from developing breast carcinoma.

=== Systemic lupus erythematosus ===
The presence of fetal cells in mothers can be associated with benefits when it comes to certain autoimmune diseases. In particular, male fetal cells are related to helping mothers with systemic lupus erythematosus. When kidney biopsies were taken from patients with lupus nephritis, DNA was extracted and run with PCR. The male fetal DNA was quantified and the presence of specific Y chromosome sequences were found. Women with lupus nephritis containing male fetal cells in their kidney biopsies exhibited better renal system functioning. Levels of serum creatinine, which is related to kidney failure, were low in mothers with high levels of male fetal cells. In contrast, women without male fetal cells who had lupus nephritis showed a more serious form of glomerulonephritis and higher levels of serum creatinine.

The specific role that fetal cells play in microchimerism related to certain autoimmune diseases is not fully understood. However, one hypothesis states that these cells supply antigens, causing inflammation and triggering the release of different foreign antigens. This would trigger autoimmune disease instead of serving as a therapeutic. A different hypothesis states that fetal microchimeric cells are involved in repairing tissues. When tissues get inflamed, fetal microchimeric cells go to the damaged site and aid in repair and regeneration of the tissue.

=== Thyroid disease ===
Fetal maternal microchimerism may be related to autoimmune thyroid diseases. There have been reports of fetal cells in the lining of the blood and thyroid glands of patients with autoimmune thyroid disease. These cells could become activated after delivery of the baby after immune suppression in the mother is lost, suggesting a role of fetal cells in the pathogenesis of such diseases. Two types of thyroid disease, Hashimoto's thyroiditis (HT) and Graves' disease (GD), show similarities to graft vs host disease which occurs after hematopoietic stem cell transplants. Fetal cells colonize maternal tissues like the thyroid gland and are able to survive many years postpartum. These fetal microchimeric cells in the thyroid show up in the blood of women affected by thyroid diseases.

=== Sjögren syndrome ===
Sjögren syndrome (SS) is an autoimmune rheumatic disease of the exocrine glands. Increased incidence of SS after childbirth suggests a relationship between SS and pregnancy, and this led to the hypothesis that fetal microchimerism may be involved in SS pathogenesis. Studies showed the presence of Y-chromosome-positive fetal cells in minor salivary glands in 11 of 20 women with SS but in only one of eight normal controls. Fetal cells in salivary glands suggest that they may be involved in the development of SS.

=== Oral lichen planus ===
Lichen planus (LP) is a T-cell-mediated autoimmune chronic disease of unknown etiology. Females have a three times higher prevalence than men. LP is characterized by T lymphocytes infiltration of the lower levels of epithelium, where they damage basal cells and cause apoptosis. The fetal microchimerism may trigger a fetus versus host reaction and therefore may play a role in the pathogenesis of autoimmune diseases including LP.

=== Breast cancer ===
Pregnancy has a positive effect on the prognosis of breast cancer according to several studies and it apparently increases the chance of survival after diagnosis of breast cancer. Possible positive effects of pregnancy could be explained by the persistence of fetal cells in the blood and maternal tissues.

Fetal cells are probably actively migrating from peripheral blood into the tumor tissue where they are preferentially settled in the tumor stroma and one their concentration decreases as they get closer to the healthy breast tissue. There are two suggested mechanisms by which the fetal cells could have the positive effect on the breast cancer prognosis. The first mechanism suggests that fetal cells only oversee cancer cells and they attract components of the immune system if needed. The second option is that the down-regulation of the immune system induced by the presence of fetal cells could ultimately lead to cancer prevention, because women in whom FMC is present produce lower concentrations of inflammatory mediators, which may lead to the development of neoplastic tissue.

The effect also depends on the level of microchimerism: Hyperchimerism (a high rate of microchimerism) and hypochimerism (a low rate of microchimerism) can be related to the negative effect of FMC and thus can promote a worse prognosis of breast cancer. Apparently, women with breast cancer may fail in the process of obtaining and maintaining allogeneic fetal cells. Low concentration and / or complete absence of fetal cells could indicate a predisposition to development of the malignant process.

=== Other cancers ===
Study of S. Hallum shows association between male origin fetal cells and ovarian cancer risk. Presence of Y chromosome was used to detect foreign cells in women's blood. Microchimerism is a result of pregnancy, possibility that foreign cells were of transfusion or transplantation origin was rejected due to women's health. Women testing positive for male origin microchimerism cells had reduced hazard rates of ovarian cancer than women testing negative. Pregnancy at older ages can reduce risk of ovarian cancer. Numbers of microchimeric cells declines after pregnancy, and ovarian cancer is most frequent in postmenopausal women. This suggests that fetal microchimerism may play a protective role in ovarian cancer as well. Microchimeric cells also cluster several times more in lung tumors than in surrounding healthy lung tissue. Fetal cells from the bone marrow go to the tumor sites where they may have tissue repair functions. Microchimerism of fetomaternal cell trafficking origin might be associated with the pathogenesis or progression of cervical cancer. Male cells were observed in patients with cervical cancer but not in positive controls. Microchimeric cells might induce the alteration of the woman's immune system and make the cervical tissue more susceptible to HPV infection or provide a suitable environment for tumor growth.

== Role of microchimerism in wound healing ==
Microchimeric fetal cells expressed collagen I, III and TGF-β3, and they were identified in healed maternal cesarean section scars. This suggests that these cells migrate to the site of damage due to maternal skin injury signals, and help repair tissue.

== Stem cells ==
=== Animal models ===
Fetomaternal microchimerism has been shown in experimental investigations of whether fetal cells can cross the blood brain barrier in mice. The properties of these cells allow them to cross the blood brain barrier and target injured brain tissue. This mechanism is possible because umbilical cord blood cells express some proteins similar to neurons. When these umbilical cord blood cells are injected in rats with brain injury or stroke, they enter the brain and express certain nerve cell markers. Due to this process, fetal cells could enter the brain during pregnancy and become differentiated into neural cells. Fetal microchimerism can occur in the maternal mouse brain, responding to certain cues in the maternal body.

== Health implications ==
Fetal microchimerism could have an implication on maternal health. Isolating cells in cultures can alter the properties of the stem cells, but in pregnancy the effects of fetal stem cells can be investigated without in vitro cultures. Once characterized and isolated, fetal cells that are able to cross the blood brain barrier could impact certain procedures. For example, isolating stem cells can be accomplished through taking them from sources like the umbilical cord. These fetal stem cells can be used in intravenous infusion to repair the brain tissue. Hormonal changes in pregnancy alter neurogenesis, which could create favorable environments for fetal cells to respond to injury.

The true function on fetal cells in mothers is not fully known, however, there have been reports of positive and negative health effects. The sharing of genes between the fetus and mother may lead to benefits. Due to not all genes being shared, health complications may arise as a result of resource allocation. During pregnancy, fetal cells are able to manipulate the maternal system to draw resources from the placenta, while the maternal system tries to limit it.

== See also ==
- Chimerism
- Allotransplantation
- Epigenetics
- Cell-free fetal DNA
- Mitochondrial replacement therapy
