= KIR2DS1 =

Protein-coding gene in the species Homo sapiens

Identifiers
- Aliases: KIR2DS1, CD158H, CD158a, p50.1, KIR2DP1DL1, KIR2DS4, killer cell immunoglobulin like receptor, two Ig domains and short cytoplasmic tail 1
- External IDs: OMIM: 604952; GeneCards: KIR2DS1
Gene ontology
Molecular function	transmembrane signaling receptor activity; protein binding
Cellular component	integral component of membrane; membrane; plasma membrane
Biological process	innate immune response; immune response; regulation of immune response; signal transduction
Sources:Amigo / QuickGO
Orthologs
Databases	NCBI: entry
Species	Human	Mouse
Entrez	3806	n/a
Ensembl	n/a	n/a
UniProt	Q14954	n/a
RefSeq (mRNA)	NM_014512	n/a
RefSeq (protein)	NP_055327	n/a
Location (UCSC)	n/a	n/a
PubMed search		n/a
- Wikidata
View/Edit Human

Killer cell immunoglobulin-like receptor, two domains, short cytoplasmic tail, 1 is a protein that in humans is encoded by the KIR2DS1 gene.

== Function ==
Killer cell immunoglobulin-like receptors (KIRs) are transmembrane glycoproteins expressed by natural killer cells and subsets of T cells. The KIR genes are polymorphic and highly homologous and they are found in a cluster on chromosome 19q13.4 within the 1 Mb leukocyte receptor complex (LRC). The gene content of the KIR gene cluster varies among haplotypes, although several 'framework' genes are found in all haplotypes (KIR3DL3, KIR3DP1, KIR3DL4, KIR3DL2). The KIR proteins are classified by the number of extracellular immunoglobulin domains (2D or 3D) and by whether they have a long (L) or short (S) cytoplasmic domain. KIR proteins with the long cytoplasmic domain transduce inhibitory signals upon ligand binding via an immunoreceptor tyrosine-based inhibitory motif (ITIM), while KIR proteins with the short cytoplasmic domain lack the ITIM motif and instead associate with the TYRO protein tyrosine kinase binding protein to transduce activating signals. The ligands for several KIR proteins are subsets of HLA class I molecules; thus, KIR proteins are thought to play an important role in regulation of the immune response.
