= TIGIT =

Protein-coding gene in the species Homo sapiens

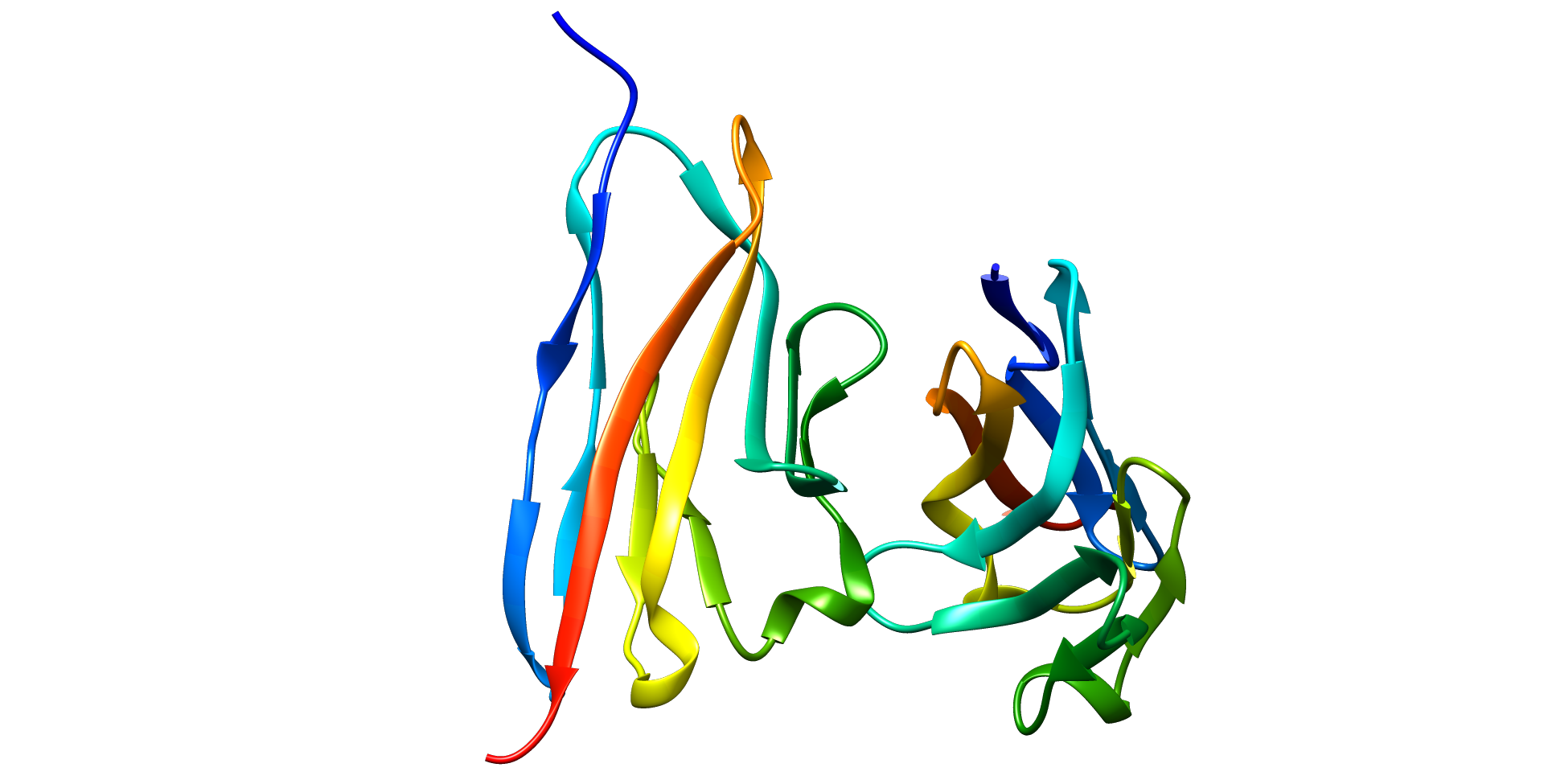

Identifiers
- Aliases: TIGIT, VSIG9, VSTM3, WUCAM, T-cell immunoreceptor with Ig and ITIM domains, T cell immunoreceptor with Ig and ITIM domains
- External IDs: OMIM: 612859; MGI: 3642260; GeneCards: TIGIT
Available structures
PDB	Ortholog search: PDBe RCSB
PDB	List of PDB id codes 3Q0H, 3RQ3, 3UCR, 3UDW

Gene location (Human)
Chr.	Chromosome 3 (human)
Band	3q13.31	Start	114,276,913 bp
Band	3q13.31	End	114,310,288 bp

Gene location (Mouse)
Chr.	Chromosome 16 (mouse)
Band	16|16 B4	Start	43,469,230 bp
Band	16|16 B4	End	43,484,509 bp
RNA expression pattern
Bgee	Human / Mouse (ortholog); Top expressed in: granulocyte; lymph node; gonad; appendix; testicle; spleen; oocyte; secondary oocyte; blood; gallbladder / Top expressed in: jejunum; ileum; spleen; blastocyst; morula; thymus; colon; secondary oocyte; duodenum; placenta; More reference expression data
BioGPS	n/a
Gene ontology
Molecular function	signaling receptor binding; protein binding; protein homodimerization activity; cell adhesion molecule binding; identical protein binding
Cellular component	integral component of membrane; cell surface; plasma membrane; integral component of plasma membrane; membrane
Biological process	heterophilic cell-cell adhesion via plasma membrane cell adhesion molecules; cell recognition; negative regulation of T cell activation; positive regulation of interleukin-10 production; homophilic cell adhesion via plasma membrane adhesion molecules; negative regulation of interleukin-12 production
Sources:Amigo / QuickGO
Orthologs
Databases	NCBI: entry; OMA: entry
Species	Human	Mouse
Entrez	201633	100043314
Ensembl	ENSG00000181847	ENSMUSG00000071552
UniProt	Q495A1	P86176
RefSeq (mRNA)	NM_173799	NM_001146325
RefSeq (protein)	NP_776160	NP_001139797
Location (UCSC)	Chr 3: 114.28 – 114.31 Mb	Chr 16: 43.47 – 43.48 Mb
PubMed search
- Wikidata
View/Edit Human	View/Edit Mouse

TIGIT (/ˈtɪdʒɪt/ TIJ-it; also called T cell immunoreceptor with Ig and ITIM domains) is an immune receptor present on some T cells and natural killer cells (NK). It is also identified as WUCAM and Vstm3. TIGIT could bind to CD155 (PVR) on dendritic cells (DCs), macrophages, etc. with high affinity, and also to CD112 (PVRL2) with lower affinity.

Numerous clinical trials on TIGIT-blockade in cancer have recently been initiated, predominantly combination treatments. The first interim results show promise for combined TIGIT and PD-L1 co-blockade in solid cancer patients. Mechanistically, research has shown that TIGIT-Fc fusion protein could interact with PVR on dendritic cells and increase its IL-10 secretion level/decrease its IL-12 secretion level under LPS stimulation, and also inhibit T cell activation in vivo. TIGIT's inhibition of NK cytotoxicity can be blocked by antibodies against its interaction with PVR and the activity is directed through its ITIM domain.

== Clinical significance ==
TIGIT regulates T-cell mediated immunity via the CD226/TIGIT-PVR pathway.

=== HIV ===
During human immunodeficiency virus (HIV) infection, TIGIT expressing CD8^{+} T cells have been shown to be expanded and associated with clinical markers of HIV disease progression in a diverse group of HIV infected individuals. Elevated TIGIT levels remained sustained even among those with undetectable viral loads. A large fraction of HIV-specific CD8^{+} T cells simultaneously express both TIGIT and another negative checkpoint receptor, programmed death protein 1 (PD-1) and retained several features of exhausted T cells. Blocking these pathways with novel targeted monoclonal antibodies synergistically rejuvenated HIV-specific CD8^{+} T cell responses. Further, the TIGIT pathway is active in the rhesus macaque non-human primate model, and mimics expression and function during simian immunodeficiency virus (SIV) infection. This pathway can potentially be targeted to enhance killing of HIV infected cells during "Shock and Kill" HIV curative approaches.

=== Cancer ===
TIGIT and PD-1 has been shown to be over-expressed on tumor antigen-specific (TA-specific) CD8^{+} T cells and CD8^{+} tumor infiltrating lymphocytes (TILs) from individuals with melanoma. Blockade of TIGIT and PD-1 led to increased cell proliferation, cytokine production, and degranulation of TA-specific CD8^{+} T cells and TIL CD8^{+} T cells. It can be considered an immune checkpoint. Co-blockade of TIGIT and PD-1 pathways elicits tumor rejection in preclinical murine models. Numerous anti-TIGIT therapies have entered clinical development.

== Tiragolumab ==
Tiragolumab is the furthest progressed anti-TIGIT therapy in development. In non-small cell lung cancer (NSCLC) setting, the phase II CITYSCAPE clinical trial (NCT03563716) evaluated the combination of the anti-TIGIT antibody tiragolumab in combination with the anti-PD-L1 antibody atezolizumab in patients with newly-diagnosed non-small cell lung cancer whose tumors expressed PD-L1. After a median follow-up of 16.3 months, the combination of tiragolumab and atezolizumab reduced the risk of disease progression or death by 38% compared to atezolizumab monotherapy. In a subset of patients with high PD-L1 expression (at least 50% of tumor cells expressing PD-L1), the combination of tiragolumab with atezolizumab further reduced the risk of disease progression or death by 71% compared to atezolizumab monotherapy. Overall, patients who received the combination of atezolizumab and tiragolumab lived a median of 23.2 months, compared to 14.5 months with atezolizumab monotherapy. Despite this initial success, there was concern that the benefit of PFS in the tiragolumab + atezolizumab arm was driven by the underperformance of atezolizumab in this trial. Another concern was that there was no link between TIGIT expression and the efficacy of tiragolumab in the trial.

The phase III, randomized, double-blinded SKYSCRAPER-01 trial, which evaluates the efficacy of the combination of tiragolumab and atezolizumab in NSCLC patients whose tumors have high PD-L1 expression, failed to show a significant PFS improvement in the combination arm compared with placebo + atezolizumab, although it showed "a numerical improvement" in both endpoints of PFS and overall survival (OS). In August 2023, an internal PowerPoint presentation detailing OS data of the second analysis was mistakenly made public on the Internet and showed a numerical improvement in terms of OS [estimated overall survival after a median follow-up of 15,5 months: 22,9 months in tiragolumab + atezolizumab arm versus 16,7 months in placebo + atezolizumab arm, HR: 0,81 (95% CI: 0,63, 1,03)]. No new safety signals were identified and the trial remains blinded to investigators and patients.

Tiragolumab also shows encouraging efficacy in hepatocellular carcinoma setting. In the MORPHEUS-liver trial, tiragolumab + atezolizumab + bevacizumab significantly improved response rate and PFS in both patients with positive PD-L1 expression and with negative PD-L1 expression.

In small-cell lung cancer, tiragolumab didn't show any OS and PFS benefit in the SKYSCRAPER-02 trial, but its development in SCLC setting is being continued as consolidation therapy for patients with limited-stage SCLC who have not progressed during/after chemotherapy and radiotherapy (NCT04308785).

In the Skyscraper-04 trial assessing the efficacy and safety of tiragolumab in patients who have recurrent, PD-L1 positive cervical cancer, the combination of tiragolumab and atezolizumab, although improved response rate in both PD-L1 low and PD-L1 high subgroups, only did so marginally and non-significantly.

The combination of tiragolumab, atezolizumab, and platinum-containing chemotherapy improved PFS and OS compared with comparator arms in esophageal cancer patients in the phase II MORPHEUS-EC trial and the phase III SKYSCRAPER-08 trial.

The Skyscraper-06 trial was ended in July 2024 in metastatic non-squamous non-small cell lung cancer as tiragolumab plus Tecentriq and chemotherapy did not meet the primary endpoints of progression-free survival (PFS) at primary analysis and overall survival (OS) at the first interim analysis. The OS hazard ratio was 1.33 at the first interim analysis, indicating that patients are living longer on Keytruda than tiragolumab.

== Other inhibitors ==
- Vibostolimab
- Ociperlimab

== See also ==
- T cell receptor
- Antigen
