= KIR2DL1 =

Protein-coding gene in the species Homo sapiens

Identifiers
- Aliases: KIR2DL1, CD158A, KIR-K64, KIR221, NKAT, NKAT-1, NKAT1, p58.1, killer cell immunoglobulin like receptor, two Ig domains and long cytoplasmic tail 1, KIR2DS1, KIR2DL3
- External IDs: OMIM: 604936; GeneCards: KIR2DL1
Available structures
PDB	Human UniProt search: PDBe RCSB
PDB	List of PDB id codes 1IM9, 1NKR

Gene location (Human)
Chr.	Chromosome 19 (human)
Band	19q13.42	Start	54,769,793 bp
Band	19q13.42	End	54,784,322 bp
RNA expression pattern
Bgee	Human / Mouse (ortholog); Top expressed in: testicle; granulocyte; blood; spleen; right lung; upper lobe of left lung; bone marrow; endometrium; monocyte; placenta / n/a; More reference expression data
BioGPS	n/a
Gene ontology
Molecular function	protein binding; signaling receptor activity
Cellular component	integral component of membrane; plasma membrane; integral component of plasma membrane; membrane
Biological process	natural killer cell inhibitory signaling pathway; immune response; regulation of immune response
Sources:Amigo / QuickGO
Orthologs
Databases	NCBI: entry; OMA: entry
Species	Human	Mouse
Entrez	3802	n/a
Ensembl	ENSG00000278821; ENSG00000275196; ENSG00000278805; ENSG00000125498; ENSG00000284401 ENSG00000278755; ENSG00000278495; ENSG00000278738; ENSG00000278248; ENSG00000278503; ENSG00000284530; ENSG00000276820; ENSG00000275080; ENSG00000275276; ENSG00000273794; ENSG00000276625; ENSG00000277616; ENSG00000284100; ENSG00000284514; ENSG00000283723; ENSG00000274926; ENSG00000278207; ENSG00000274782; ENSG00000284347; ENSG00000273510; ENSG00000274692; ENSG00000277833; ENSG00000276310; ENSG00000284551; ENSG00000275750; ENSG00000275522; ENSG00000277356; ENSG00000284145	n/a
UniProt	P43626	n/a
RefSeq (mRNA)	NM_014218	n/a
RefSeq (protein)	NP_055033	n/a
Location (UCSC)	Chr 19: 54.77 – 54.78 Mb	n/a
PubMed search		n/a
- Wikidata
View/Edit Human

Killer cell immunoglobulin-like receptor 2DL1 is a protein that in humans is encoded by the KIR2DL1 gene.

KIR2DL1 is a receptor that is usually found on Natural Killer Cells (NK Cells). This receptor’s job is to send inhibitory signals. It communicates with a cell, telling it to stop what it is doing when it is not needed. This typically happens when a cell is healthy and does not need NK cells to release toxic proteins which would otherwise kill the healthy cell. This receptor specifically recognizes HLA-C2 molecules, which are proteins that help receptors know the cell is healthy. Without KIR2DL1, the human body would struggle to identify the HLA-C2 molecules, resulting in an unnecessary attack on the good cells. Along with that, bad cells might attack the body without the NK cells knowing. This is what makes the KIR2DL1 receptors so important. They help everything else work within our immune system.

== Function ==
Killer-cell immunoglobulin-like receptors (KIRs) are transmembrane glycoproteins expressed by natural killer cells and subsets of T cells. The KIR genes are polymorphic and highly homologous and they are found in a cluster on chromosome 19q13.4 within the 1 Mb leukocyte receptor complex (LRC). The gene content of the KIR gene cluster varies among haplotypes, although several "framework" genes are found in all haplotypes (KIR3DL3, KIR3DP1, KIR2DL4, KIR3DL2). The KIR proteins are classified by the number of extracellular immunoglobulin domains (2D or 3D) and by whether they have a long (L) or short (S) cytoplasmic domain. KIR proteins with the long cytoplasmic domain transduce inhibitory signals upon ligand binding via an immune tyrosine-based inhibitory motif (ITIM), while KIR proteins with the short cytoplasmic domain lack the ITIM motif and instead associate with the TYRO protein tyrosine kinase binding protein to transduce activating signals. The ligands for several KIR proteins are subsets of HLA class I molecules; thus, KIR proteins are thought to play an important role in regulation of the immune response.

Natural Killer cells, also known as NK cells are cells that listen to a signal and then act on it. They check other cells to see if they say HLA-C2, and if they do then they let them be, although if they don’t they start activating. These natural killer cells have toxic proteins that can kill another cell if released. They will try to break open and kill this cell with their injections of toxic chemicals, which are usually Perforin and Granzymes. Natural Killer cells need inhibitory receptors to help the immune system not attack healthy cells. Healthy cells have MHC-1 molecules on them and the inhibitory receptors will recognize that as a healthy cell and tell the NK cells not to kill them. MHC-1 is a family of antigen presenting molecules. HLA-C2 is a molecule that belongs in that family but works best with NK cells. Inhibitory receptors are needed so that NK cells don't go and kill all the healthy cells. When KIR2DL1 binds to HLA-C2 on a healthy cell, an inhibitory signal will communicate with the natural killer cell and turn off its killing instinct and tell it it's a safe cell. This communication will stop the natural killer cell from releasing toxic chemicals. The toxic chemicals that are usually released at this time will be blocked. The NK cell will completely detach from the healthy cell, leaving it unharmed. This all helps prevent damage to healthy cells and make sure the normal tissues don't get destroyed from the release of NK cell toxic chemicals.

In contrast to the KIR2DL1 inhibitory receptors which focus on stopping natural killer cells from killing healthy cells, we also have KIR2DS1 activating receptors. KIR2DS1 activating receptors encourage cells to activate, causing a killing response. The importance of KIR2DS1 is that the killing response allows the body to clean up dead, infected or compromised cells by communicating with the NK cells and encouraging them to destroy these cells.

Therefore, the Natural Killer cells attach to a cell and analyze it, weighting out the KIR2DL1 and the KIR2DS1 signals. Depending on the strength of the signals, KIR2DL1 inhibitory receptors begin a biochemical tug of war with the activating KIR2DS1 receptors. Whichever signal is stronger (denser connection with the cell targets) wins and then causes the reaction of the NK Cell. If the inhibitory receptor is stronger the healthy cell will remain alive. However if the activating receptor is stronger that cell will be destroyed from the release of Perforin and Granzymes. Activating receptors will notice when cells do not look healthy, this can come in forms of infection, stress, and damage. First there are stress signals which release certain proteins that are identifiable, these cells are usually damaged by heat or DNA mutations. There are also infected cells that show viral proteins which makes them look like a bad cell. The next one that activating receptors identify right away is antibody tags, which are cells covered in antibodies from the immune system. If inhibitory signals did not exist, natural killer cells would destroy healthy cells that we need in our immune system. If activating signals did not exist, infectious or cancerous cells would not be able to be detected and they would roam around freely harming our immune systems. The body would not be able to detect or kill viruses, or bacteria. If we did not have both of these receptors our immune system would completely fail.

== Ligand specificity ==
A ligand is a molecule that attaches to a receptor and allows the receptor to send a signal. Ligands are specific, only allowing certain receptors to connect with a cell. KIR2DL1 and KIR2DS1 receptors connect specifically with the HLA-C2 ligand, which then tells the NK cell what to do with the targeted cell. Since KIR2DL1 is an inhibitory receptor, when it is connected with a HLA-C2 ligand on a healthy cell it will signal to natural killer cells to not attack or release toxic chemicals. There are many ligands and many receptors but only a few ligands will be preferred by a certain receptor. KIR2DL1 chooses HLA-C2 over HLA-C1 because this receptor has a certain home for the ligand that only will fit HLA-C2. If KIR2DL1 tries to bind with HLA-C1 molecules, the receptor will not be able to bind tightly, and it will not be able to stay attached. When KIR2DL1 is binded to HLA-C2, it will send a powerful signal to the NK cells informing it not to kill. The target cell is now being protected and the NK cell moves on to scan the next cell.

HLA-C2 ligands and HLA-C1 ligands are so similar but they have one section that is different. HLA-C2 has a large positively charged molecule called Lysine, while HLA-C1 has a smaller neutral one that is called Asparagine. These little differences in the molecule can change its shape enough to where the HLA-C2 molecule fits perfectly in the spot where KIR2DL1 needs it while HLA-C1 does not fit as perfectly. It does not seem like this would make that big of a difference, but changing even one amino acid can change the size and the electrical charge. Receptors are not just flat surfaces these ligands stick to, they have a pocket that stays the same size. This makes receptors very picky to what ligands they can bind to, because they have to fit in this pocket. This is why KIR2DL1 cannot attach to HLA-C1, because when KIR2DL1 tries to bind with HLA-C1 it is too short and leaves a big gap in the pocket of the KIR2DL1 receptor. This gap leaves a loose pocket, which does not allow a tight connection to be formed. Since HLA-C1 also does not have that strong positive charge like HLA-C2 does, there is no electrical attraction between the receptor and the ligand.

Ligand specificity matters because it is the main support for the immune system to not destroy itself. It helps cells communicate and recognize safe cells that are healthy versus unsafe cells that need to be destroyed. Without the ligands binding with the signals, natural killer cells would never know when to attack and release Perforin and Granzymes. They would also never know when to know a cell is healthy and not needing to be destroyed. If KIR2DL1 could not bind to HLA-C2 molecules, a whole section of your immune system would be paralyzed, especially your natural killer cells. If NK cells can recognize the correct ligand, then they won’t attack healthy tissues in the body. It is very important these healthy cells send a clear inhibitory signal so that the NK cells don't get confused. These signals can help cells stop moving and dividing, and keep organs at their correct size. If these signals were to fail, the cells would keep on dividing which can overwhelm the healthy tissue, steal nutrients that other cells need more, and finally can cause organ failure. This ligand specificity helps the immune system attack infected or cancerous cells by having the receptors recognize the oddly shaped ligands. Once that happens they can bind and a signal will be sent inside the immune cell, which then can release poisons to destroy the cell. If this immune function was not working properly, infected or cancerous cells would start multiplying and spreading all throughout the body.

== Genetic variation ==
An allele is a different version of a gene found on a chromosome, everyone has two alleles one from each parent for every one gene. KIR2DL1 is a gene and not everyone has it. Almost everyone does but there are different versions of it, not everyone has the same sequence. Since an allele is a DNA sequence, a singular change in the DNA sequence can create a different allele. Amino acids are the ones that interact with the ligand and form bonds to secure the ligand in place and ultimately decide what the receptor will do. After the DNA sequence changes, the amino acid sequence of the receptor changes, this can determine if a receptor binds to its ligand securely or not bind at all. It matters that everyone has different versions of these receptors and genes, because if we all had the same versions a single virus or bacteria could destroy everyone's immune system.

Pathogens are germs or organisms that cause disease in another organism. They enter the body and multiply and cause people to be sick. Pathogens are separated into five different groups, viruses, bacteria, fungi, parasites, and prions. Viruses are one of the main pathogens that affect the genetic variation in KIR2DL1. When these viruses try to harm a healthy cell in the human body they enter the cell and alter the Ligand, trying to hide it from the receptor, therefore shutting down HLA-C2 ligand. This leads to the Natural Killer Cells roaming around the targeted cell and the KIR2DL1 receptors are unable to find a binding site to communicate with the cell. Interestingly, if these HLA-C2 ligands are unavailable and the KIR2DL1 receptor has no communication with the NK cells, they end up killing the infected cell. A virus is very good at manipulating natural killer cells, that is why KIR2DL1 receptors are constantly being replaced to adapt to new diseases and viruses and not get taken over by them. The genetic variation in KIR2DL1 is very important in modern medicine too because it helps decide how a patient's immune system will react when encountering an infection or virus. Since this receptor is the one that communicates with the natural killer cells, having different genetic codes can affect how someone will react to diseases, immunotherapy, and even transplants.

== Clinical significance ==
KIR2DL1 matters in medicine because this receptor will determine if a person’s immune system will react properly to everyday pathogens. This receptor controls natural killer cells and those cells are in charge of destroying cells that are bad or keeping cells that are good. If this receptor does not react properly, the patient may not be able to protect its healthy cells from bad cells that will create viruses and tumors. Natural killer cells play a big role in how our body will react to cells in our immune system. They will either fail to kill these threatening cells, or attack its own body and kill good cells. NK cells failing to react can affect many different diseases that can occur in the human body.

One example of this is cancer, specifically leukemia. Leukemia is a cancer of the blood and bone marrow, this makes it very visible to NK cells. Unlike breast or lung cancer, leukemia can't hide behind physical tissues because it is in the open in the bloodstream and bone marrow. Since natural killer cells can recognize leukemia so easily, KIR2DL1 has a very important role in deciding whether to tell the NK cells to kill those cells or let them live. However, leukemia cells are tricky because they maintain HLA-C2 ligands that favor KIR2DL1. This causes the NK Cells to protect the leukemia cells, allowing them to start multiplying and spreading super fast. This is also important for when patients need a donor. Let's say a patient needs a bone marrow donor. If the donor has NK cells with KIR2DL1 but the patient does not have enough HLA-C2 ligand, the NK cells will then be able to destroy the leukemia cells since they can then bind and create a tight connection. The doctors will find this mismatch by looking at the patient and the donor's DNA sequences. They will then look at HLA-C genes to see if the patient carries HLA-C2 which is the ligand that communicates with the KIR2DL1 to destroy the bad cells. If they do carry it then they could be a match and start the transplantation.

Another example of how KIR2DL1 is relevant in the medical field is how it affects pregnancy. KIR2DL1 receptors are used by another type of natural killer cells called uterine natural killer cells. These are used to help provide a healthy blood supply to the developing fetus. This happens by the uNK cells controlling how fetal cells go into the uterine walls and how far they go. This receptor interacts with fetal genes and influences complications during pregnancy. During a pregnancy, fetal cells have to move into the mothers uterus with low resistance vessels. This will help make sure that nutrients and oxygen get to the fetus so it can survive. As these fetal cells are moving through they will show HLA-C2 ligands and connect with the mothers KIR2DL1 receptors on the uNK cells. Although this can go completely wrong in some scenarios. If the mother has highly sensitive KIR2DL1 receptors and the baby has HLA-C2 genes that came from the fathers genes. When the HLA-C2 binds to the mothers sensitive KIR2DL1 receptor, the uNK cells will react in a negative way and stop the connection. The natural killer cells will stop sending signals to pull the fetal cells forward. This then leads to restricted blood flow, which will lead to the placenta receiving no oxygen. The placenta when it has no oxygen will start to release toxic proteins into the bloodstream of the mother. This can cause a spike in blood pressure, a low birth rate, or even a miscarriage. KIR2DL1 is very important for clinical significance to make sure our bodies can function our immune systems properly and defend our good cells, as well as killing our bad cells.

== Interactions ==
KIR2DL1 has been shown to interact with HLA-C.

== See also ==
- Cluster of differentiation
