= Abraham Kupfer =

Israeli American academic

Abraham "Avi" Kupfer (died Baltimore, June 25, 2026 at the age of 77,see https://hub.jhu.edu/2026/07/28/abraham-kupfer-obituary), was an Israeli American professor of cell biology, and the co-director of immunobiology at the Johns Hopkins University School of Medicine. Kupfer discovered the immunological synapse at the National Jewish Medical and Research Center in Denver. He first presented his findings during a Keystone Symposia in 1995, when he showed three-dimensional images of immune cells interacting with one another. His main focus is on teaching and studying the mechanisms of inter- and intra-cellular communication in the immune system.

Kupfer was a native of Israel. He received his Ph.D. from the Weizmann Institute of Science.
