= KIR2DS4 =

Protein-coding gene in the species Homo sapiens

Identifiers
- Aliases: KIR2DS4, CD158I, KIR1D, KIR2DS1, KIR412, KKA3, NKAT-8, NKAT8, KIR-2DS4, killer cell immunoglobulin like receptor, two Ig domains and short cytoplasmic tail 4
- External IDs: OMIM: 604955; GeneCards: KIR2DS4
Available structures
| PDB | Human UniProt search: PDBe RCSB |
| PDB | List of PDB id codes 3H8N |

Gene location (Human)
| Chr. | Chromosome 19 (human) |
| Band | 19q13.42 | Start | 54,832,676 bp |
| Band | 19q13.42 | End | 54,848,569 bp |
RNA expression pattern
| Bgee | Human / Mouse (ortholog); Top expressed in: tendon of biceps brachii; granulocyte; blood; bone marrow cell; spleen; right lung; placenta; endometrium; pharynx; upper lobe of lung / n/a; More reference expression data |
| BioGPS | n/a |
Gene ontology
| Molecular function | protein binding; MHC class Ib protein binding |
| Cellular component | integral component of plasma membrane; membrane; integral component of membrane; plasma membrane |
| Biological process | innate immune response |
Sources:Amigo / QuickGO
Orthologs
| Databases | NCBI: entry; OMA: entry |
| Species | Human | Mouse |
| Entrez | 3809 | n/a |
| Ensembl | ENSG00000273931; ENSG00000274406; ENSG00000277078; ENSG00000274807; ENSG00000275353 ENSG00000275731; ENSG00000273526; ENSG00000275351; ENSG00000274921; ENSG00000277345; ENSG00000276885; ENSG00000284408; ENSG00000274957; ENSG00000276154; ENSG00000284307; ENSG00000283779; ENSG00000274324; ENSG00000221957; ENSG00000274714; ENSG00000274533; ENSG00000276209; ENSG00000276634; ENSG00000276465; ENSG00000274947; ENSG00000283727; ENSG00000283846; ENSG00000276395; ENSG00000275938; ENSG00000284244; ENSG00000284264; ENSG00000283870; ENSG00000283882; ENSG00000276254 | n/a |
| UniProt | P43632; Q8NHJ0 | n/a |
| RefSeq (mRNA) | NM_012314; NM_001281971; NM_001281972 | n/a |
| RefSeq (protein) | NP_001268900; NP_001268901; NP_036446; NP_001268900.1 | n/a |
| Location (UCSC) | Chr 19: 54.83 – 54.85 Mb | n/a |
| PubMed search | | n/a |
- Wikidata
| View/Edit Human |

Killer cell immunoglobulin-like receptor 2DS4 is a protein that in humans is encoded by the KIR2DS4 gene.

Killer cell immunoglobulin-like receptors (KIRs) are transmembrane glycoproteins expressed by natural killer cells and subsets of T cells. The KIR genes are polymorphic and highly homologous and they are found in a cluster on chromosome 19q13.4 within the 1 Mb leukocyte receptor complex (LRC). The gene content of the KIR gene cluster varies among haplotypes, although several "framework" genes are found in all haplotypes (KIR3DL3, KIR3DP1, KIR3DL4, KIR3DL2). The KIR proteins are classified by the number of extracellular immunoglobulin domains (2D or 3D) and by whether they have a long (L) or short (S) cytoplasmic domain. KIR proteins with the long cytoplasmic domain transduce inhibitory signals upon ligand binding via an immune tyrosine-based inhibitory motif (ITIM), while KIR proteins with the short cytoplasmic domain lack the ITIM motif and instead associate with the TYRO protein tyrosine kinase (DAP12) binding protein to transduce activating signals. The ligands for several KIR proteins are subsets of HLA class I molecules; thus, KIR proteins are thought to play an important role in regulation of the immune response.

KIR2DS4 is a product of a gene conversion with KIR3DL2. KIR2DS4 has unusual HLA-I specificity binding some HLA-C allotypes and HLA-A*11. A common allele of KIR2DS4 encodes a truncated version (KIR-1D) that has no HLA-I binding ability. Recent evidence suggests KIR2DS4 detects HLA-C presented peptides in a peptide-specific manner, detecting peptides conserved in bacteria.

== See also ==
- Cluster of differentiation
