= Lirilumab =

Monoclonal antibody

Monoclonal antibody
- Type: Whole antibody
- Source: Human
- Target: KIR2DL1/2/3

Clinical data
- ATC code: none

Identifiers
- CAS Number: 1000676-41-4
- ChemSpider: none
- UNII: S9XDI9W918
- KEGG: D10444

Chemical and physical data
- Formula: C_{6452}H_{9918}N_{1698}O_{2030}S_{46}
- Molar mass: 145228.93 g·mol^{−1}

Lirilumab (INN) is a human monoclonal antibody designed for the treatment of cancer. It binds to KIR2DL1/2/3.

This drug was developed by Innate Pharma and is licensed to Bristol-Myers Squibb.

== Clinical trials ==
A phase 2 clinical trial for acute myeloid leukemia (AML) was terminated early ("failed") in 2017.

It was registered for a trial for squamous cell carcinoma of the head and neck (SCCHN), but it may be abandoned.

As of November 2017 nine clinical trials of lirilumab are registered as active.
