= KIR3DL1 =

Protein-coding gene in the species Homo sapiens

Identifiers
- Aliases: KIR3DL1, CD158E1, KIR, KIR3DL1/S1, NKAT-3, NKAT3, NKB1, NKB1B, KIR3DL2, killer cell immunoglobulin like receptor, three Ig domains and long cytoplasmic tail 1, KIR2DL5B
- External IDs: OMIM: 604946; MGI: 3612791; GeneCards: KIR3DL1
Available structures
PDB	Ortholog search: PDBe RCSB
PDB	List of PDB id codes 3VH8, 3WUW, 5B38, 5B39

Gene location (Human)
Chr.	Chromosome 19 (human)
Band	19q13.42	Start	54,816,468 bp
Band	19q13.42	End	54,830,778 bp

Gene location (Mouse)
Chr.	X chromosome (mouse)
Band	X F1|X 58.45 cM	Start	135,348,856 bp
Band	X F1|X 58.45 cM	End	135,444,805 bp
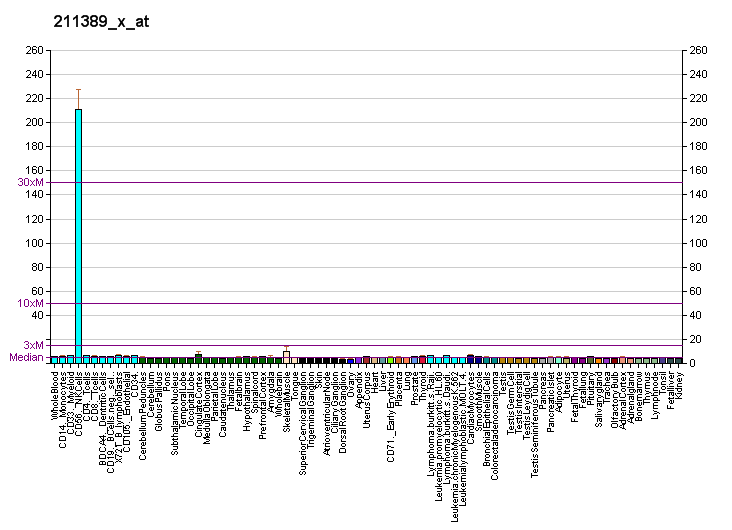

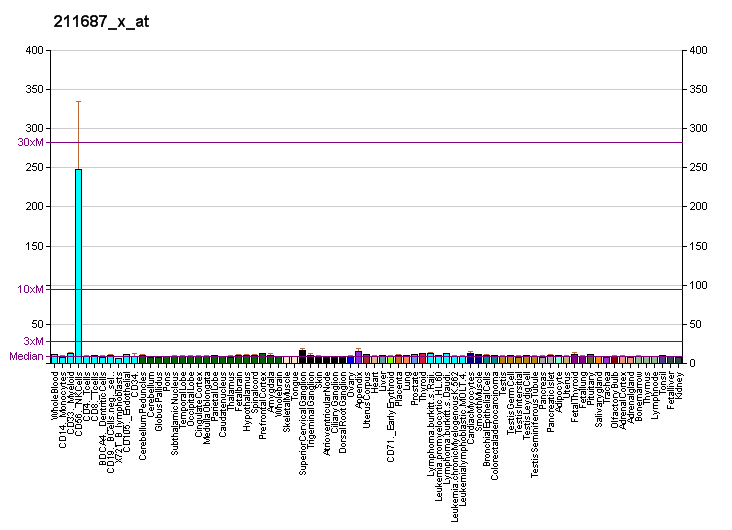

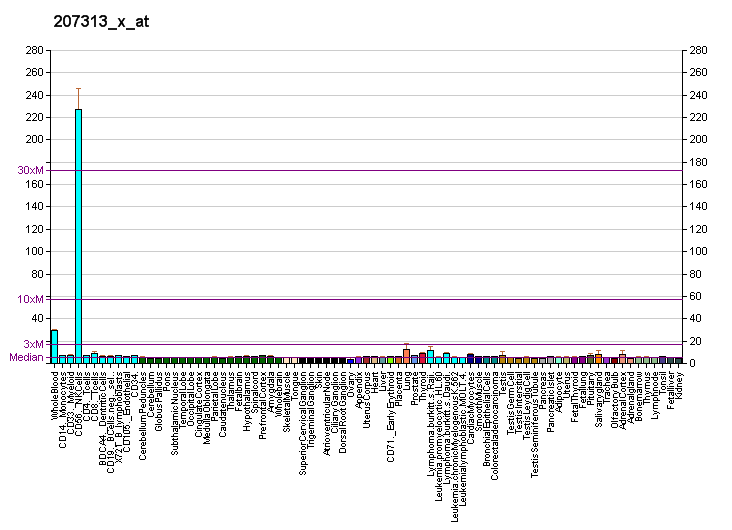
RNA expression pattern
Bgee	Human / Mouse (ortholog); Top expressed in: granulocyte; blood; spleen; right lung; upper lobe of left lung; bone marrow; lymph node; placenta; endometrium; olfactory zone of nasal mucosa / Top expressed in: zone of skin; hypothalamus; spermatid; placenta; More reference expression data
BioGPS	More reference expression data
Gene ontology
Molecular function	HLA-B specific inhibitory MHC class I receptor activity; amyloid-beta binding; protein binding
Cellular component	integral component of membrane; plasma membrane; integral component of plasma membrane; membrane
Biological process	immune response; natural killer cell mediated cytotoxicity; regulation of immune response; signal transduction
Sources:Amigo / QuickGO
Orthologs
Databases	NCBI: entry; OMA: entry
Species	Human	Mouse
Entrez	3811	245615
Ensembl	ENSG00000284589; ENSG00000274146; ENSG00000278368; ENSG00000273775; ENSG00000276501 ENSG00000278427; ENSG00000274948; ENSG00000274036; ENSG00000274920; ENSG00000275786; ENSG00000276329; ENSG00000277272; ENSG00000283954; ENSG00000275486; ENSG00000275545; ENSG00000278079; ENSG00000273518; ENSG00000275717; ENSG00000277175; ENSG00000167633; ENSG00000283729; ENSG00000283731; ENSG00000276423; ENSG00000275659; ENSG00000278856; ENSG00000284426; ENSG00000275288; ENSG00000284093; ENSG00000283827; ENSG00000284177; ENSG00000276379; ENSG00000284342	ENSMUSG00000057439
UniProt	P43629	Q673W2
RefSeq (mRNA)	NM_013289; NM_001322168	NM_177748
RefSeq (protein)	NP_001309097; NP_037421	NP_808416
Location (UCSC)	Chr 19: 54.82 – 54.83 Mb	Chr X: 135.35 – 135.44 Mb
PubMed search
- Wikidata
View/Edit Human	View/Edit Mouse

Killer cell immunoglobulin-like receptor 3DL1 is a protein that in humans is encoded by the KIR3DL1 gene.

Killer cell immunoglobulin-like receptors (KIRs) are transmembrane glycoproteins expressed by natural killer cells and subsets of T cells. The KIR genes are polymorphic and highly homologous and they are found in a cluster on chromosome 19q13.4 within the 1 Mb leukocyte immunoglobulin-like receptor complex (LRC). The gene content of the KIR gene cluster varies among haplotypes, although several "framework" genes are found in all haplotypes (KIR3DL3, KIR3DP1, KIR3DL4, KIR3DL2). The KIR proteins are classified by the number of extracellular immunoglobulin domains (2D or 3D) and by whether they have a long (L) or short (S) cytoplasmic domain. KIR proteins with the long cytoplasmic domain transduce inhibitory signals upon ligand binding via an immune tyrosine-based inhibitory motif (ITIM), while KIR proteins with the short cytoplasmic domain lack the ITIM motif and instead associate with the TYRO protein tyrosine kinase binding protein to transduce activating signals. The ligands for several KIR proteins are subsets of HLA class I molecules; thus, KIR proteins are thought to play an important role in regulation of the immune response.

== See also ==
- Cluster of differentiation
