= IGSF8 =

Protein-coding gene in humans

Identifiers
- Aliases: IGSF8, CD316, CD81P3, EWI-2, EWI2, KCT-4, LIR-D1, PGRL, immunoglobulin superfamily member 8
- External IDs: OMIM: 606644; MGI: 2154090; GeneCards: IGSF8

Gene location (Human)
Chr.	Chromosome 1 (human)
Band	1q23.2	Start	160,091,340 bp
Band	1q23.2	End	160,098,943 bp

Gene location (Mouse)
Chr.	Chromosome 1 (mouse)
Band	1 H3|1 79.59 cM	Start	172,089,208 bp
Band	1 H3|1 79.59 cM	End	172,147,408 bp
RNA expression pattern
Bgee	Human / Mouse (ortholog); Top expressed in: right hemisphere of cerebellum; right frontal lobe; Brodmann area 9; C1 segment; prefrontal cortex; cingulate gyrus; anterior cingulate cortex; putamen; hypothalamus; nucleus accumbens / Top expressed in: ventricular zone; primary visual cortex; superior frontal gyrus; dorsomedial hypothalamic nucleus; dentate gyrus of hippocampal formation granule cell; subiculum; perirhinal cortex; superior colliculus; respiratory epithelium; nasal epithelium; More reference expression data
BioGPS	n/a
Gene ontology
Molecular function	protein binding
Cellular component	extracellular exosome; membrane; integral component of membrane; plasma membrane
Biological process	skeletal muscle tissue development; nervous system development; cell population proliferation; single fertilization; cell motility
Sources:Amigo / QuickGO
Orthologs
Databases	NCBI: entry; OMA: entry
Species	Human	Mouse
Entrez	93185	140559
Ensembl	ENSG00000162729	ENSMUSG00000038034
UniProt	Q969P0	Q8R366
RefSeq (mRNA)	NM_001206665; NM_052868; NM_001320247	NM_080419
RefSeq (protein)	NP_001193594; NP_001307176; NP_443100	NP_536344
Location (UCSC)	Chr 1: 160.09 – 160.1 Mb	Chr 1: 172.09 – 172.15 Mb
PubMed search
- Wikidata
View/Edit Human	View/Edit Mouse

Immunoglobulin superfamily member 8 is a protein that in humans is encoded by the IGSF8 gene. IGSF8 has also been designated as CD316 (cluster of differentiation 316). IGSF8 is an innate immune checkpoint that inhibits the cytotoxic activity of natural killer (NK) cells. IGSF8 acts by binding to the Killer Ig-like Receptor KIR3DL2 (or, in mice, the analogous Klra9 receptor). IGSF8 is frequently overexpressed relative to normal tissues in many cancers, included melanoma, urothelial carcinoma, and breast cancer, and has been proposed as a potential therapeutic target in gliomas. In normal tissues, IGSF8 is highly expressed in the brain, where it may contribute to the immune privilege of the central nervous system.

== Cancer biomarker ==
In gliomas, IGSF8 is strongly correlated with tumor grade and is a potential prognostic marker. IGSF8 is enriched on ovarian cancer-derived extracellular vesicles and is a potential biomarker for the early detection of high grade serous ovarian cancer.
