= CD96 =

Protein found in humans

Identifiers
- Aliases: CD96, TACTILE, CD96 molecule
- External IDs: OMIM: 606037; MGI: 1934368; GeneCards: CD96

Gene location (Human)
Chr.	Chromosome 3 (human)
Band	3q13.13-q13.2	Start	111,292,719 bp
Band	3q13.13-q13.2	End	111,665,750 bp

Gene location (Mouse)
Chr.	Chromosome 16 (mouse)
Band	16|16 B5	Start	45,856,020 bp
Band	16|16 B5	End	45,940,614 bp
RNA expression pattern
Bgee	Human / Mouse (ortholog); Top expressed in: granulocyte; lymph node; blood; spleen; appendix; epithelium of colon; gallbladder; rectum; mucosa of transverse colon; bone marrow cell / Top expressed in: thymus; seminiferous tubule; blood; mesenteric lymph nodes; ganglion of vagus nerve; pharynx; spleen; subcutaneous adipose tissue; secondary oocyte; jejunum; More reference expression data
BioGPS	n/a
Orthologs
Databases	NCBI: entry; OMA: entry
Species	Human	Mouse
Entrez	10225	84544
Ensembl	ENSG00000153283	ENSMUSG00000022657
UniProt	P40200; Q8WUE2	Q3U0X8
RefSeq (mRNA)	NM_005816; NM_198196; NM_001318889	NM_032465
RefSeq (protein)	NP_001305818; NP_005807; NP_937839; NP_001305818.1	NP_115854
Location (UCSC)	Chr 3: 111.29 – 111.67 Mb	Chr 16: 45.86 – 45.94 Mb
PubMed search
- Wikidata
View/Edit Human	View/Edit Mouse

CD96 (Cluster of Differentiation 96) or Tactile (T cell activation, increased late expression) is a protein that in humans is encoded by the CD96 gene. CD96 is a receptor protein which is expressed on T cells and NK cells and shares sequence similarity with CD226 (also known as DNAM-1). The protein encoded by this gene belongs to the immunoglobulin superfamily. It is a type I membrane protein. The protein may play a role in the adhesion of activated T and NK cells to their target cells during the late phase of the immune response. It may also function in antigen presentation. Alternative splicing occurs at this locus and two transcript variants encoding distinct isoforms have been identified. CD96 is a transmembrane glycoprotein that has three extracellular immunoglobulin-like domains and is expressed by all resting human and mouse NK cells. CD96 main ligand is CD155. CD 96 has approximately 20% homology with CD226 and competed for binding to CD155 with CD226.

== Function ==
The protein encoded by this gene belongs to the immunoglobulin superfamily. It is a type I membrane protein. The protein may play a role in the adhesive interactions of activated T and NK cells during the late phase of the immune response. It may also function in antigen presentation. Alternative splicing generates multiple transcript variants encoding distinct isoforms. [provided by RefSeq, Jan 2016].
