= Killer cell immunoglobulin-like receptor 2DL3 =

KIR2DL3

Identifiers
- Aliases: KIR2DL3, CD158B2, CD158b, GL183, KIR-023GB, KIR-K7b, KIR-K7c, KIR2DS5, KIRCL23, NKAT, NKAT2, NKAT2A, NKAT2B, p58, killer cell immunoglobulin like receptor, two Ig domains and long cytoplasmic tail 3, KIR2DS3, KIR2DL
- External IDs: OMIM: 604938; GeneCards: KIR2DL3
Available structures
PDB	Human UniProt search: PDBe RCSB
PDB	List of PDB id codes 1B6U

Gene location (Human)
Chr.	Chromosome 19 (human)
Band	19q13.42	Start	54,738,513 bp
Band	19q13.42	End	54,753,052 bp
RNA expression pattern
Bgee	Human / Mouse (ortholog); Top expressed in: testicle; granulocyte; blood; spleen; bone marrow; right lung; endometrium; placenta; upper lobe of left lung; olfactory zone of nasal mucosa / n/a; More reference expression data
BioGPS	n/a
Gene ontology
Molecular function	antigen binding; protein binding; signaling receptor activity
Cellular component	integral component of membrane; plasma membrane; integral component of plasma membrane; membrane
Biological process	immune response; regulation of immune response; signal transduction
Sources:Amigo / QuickGO
Orthologs
Databases	NCBI: entry; OMA: entry
Species	Human	Mouse
Entrez	3804	n/a
Ensembl	ENSG00000283708; ENSG00000274830; ENSG00000283790; ENSG00000277554; ENSG00000274952 ENSG00000284504; ENSG00000278369; ENSG00000278327; ENSG00000284510; ENSG00000277924; ENSG00000276459; ENSG00000283702; ENSG00000274402; ENSG00000284241; ENSG00000277484; ENSG00000273887; ENSG00000275623; ENSG00000243772; ENSG00000276218; ENSG00000275658; ENSG00000273947; ENSG00000274108; ENSG00000284333; ENSG00000284044; ENSG00000277317; ENSG00000284236; ENSG00000284132; ENSG00000276590; ENSG00000275008; ENSG00000274410; ENSG00000283996	n/a
UniProt	P43628	n/a
RefSeq (mRNA)	NM_015868; NM_014511	n/a
RefSeq (protein)	NP_056952	n/a
Location (UCSC)	Chr 19: 54.74 – 54.75 Mb	n/a
PubMed search		n/a
- Wikidata
View/Edit Human

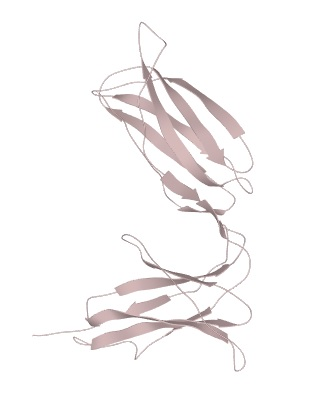

KIR2DL3, Killer cell immunoglobulin-like receptor 2DL3 is a transmembrane glycoprotein expressed by the natural killer cells and the subsets of the T cells. The KIR genes are polymorphic, which means that they have many different alleles. The KIR genes are also extremely homologous, which means that they are similar in position, structure and evolutionary origin, but not necessarily in function.

Natural killer (NK) cells are an important component of innate antiviral immune response. Have the ability to lyse target cells without prior sensitization antigen and regulate the immune responses by secreting chemokine adaptive and cytokines. Activation of NK cells is determined by integration of inhibitory signals and activating issued by several families of different receptors, including killer cell immunoglobulin-like receptors (KIR) that predominantly recognize antigens of class I human leukocyte antigen ( HLA).

== Structure and location ==
The genes responsible for coding of KIR proteins are found along the 19th chromosome section 19q 13.4 within the 1Mb Leukocyte Receptor Complex (LRC). The subsets of the KIR proteins are classified by their number of extracellular IG domains and by whether they have a long (L) or short (S) cytoplasmic domain-tail. The number coming at the end of the name of protein classifies it as a branch of the subset it belongs to.

== Function ==
The protein KIR2DL3 has long tailed cytoplasmic domain and transduce the inhibitory signal upon the ligand binding via an immunoreceptor tyrosine-based inhibitory motif (ITIM). The ligands of the protein is a subset of HLA-C molecules: HLA-Cw1, HLA-Cw3, HLA-Cw7. The protein is thought to play an important role in regulating of the immune responses. The HLA-C molecules are human leukocyte antigens and are the gene complexes to encode major histocompatibility complex (MHC) proteins in humans. HLA are polymorphic, thus the MHCs of humans differ from an individual to another. KIR2DL3 is a protein complex of two extracellular domains and a long tailed endo-cellular cytoplasmatic tail, which assign it in charge of sending inhibitory signals throughout the cell.

== Pathology ==
The protein KIR2DL3 transduces inhibitory signals upon the ligand binding via an immune tyrosine-based inhibitory motif (ITIM) to its long inner cytoplasmic tail. The tyrosine kinase based transductions are enzymatic transferences of a phosphate group from an ATP molecule to a protein in the cell. Thus functioning as an ' on ' and ' off ' switch in many cellular functions. Tyrosine Kinases are a sub-class of the protein-kinase. Phosphorylation of proteins is a necessary step in transduction of signals within a cell in order to regulate the cellular activity. Protein Kinases might get stuck in ' off ' position and inhibit the cell reproduction for good, or on the contrary might get stuck in ' on 'position, thus rendering the cell to reproduce unregulatedly, which is a necessary step for the development of cancer.
