= KIR3DL2 =

Protein-coding gene in the species Homo sapiens

Identifiers
- Aliases: KIR3DL2, CD158K, NKAT-4, NKAT4, NKAT4B, p140, 3DL2, KIR-3DL2, killer cell immunoglobulin like receptor, three Ig domains and long cytoplasmic tail 2
- External IDs: OMIM: 604947; MGI: 3612791; GeneCards: KIR3DL2

Gene location (Human)
Chr.	Chromosome 19 (human)
Band	19q13.42	Start	54,850,443 bp
Band	19q13.42	End	54,867,207 bp

Gene location (Mouse)
Chr.	X chromosome (mouse)
Band	X F1|X 58.45 cM	Start	135,348,856 bp
Band	X F1|X 58.45 cM	End	135,444,805 bp
RNA expression pattern
Bgee	Human / Mouse (ortholog); Top expressed in: testicle; granulocyte; blood; spleen; bone marrow; right lung; lymph node; gallbladder; gonad; upper lobe of left lung / Top expressed in: zone of skin; hypothalamus; spermatid; placenta; More reference expression data
BioGPS	n/a
Gene ontology
Molecular function	protein binding; MHC class Ib protein binding
Cellular component	integral component of membrane; plasma membrane; integral component of plasma membrane; membrane
Biological process	cellular defense response; regulation of immune response; negative regulation of neuron death
Sources:Amigo / QuickGO
Orthologs
Databases	NCBI: entry; OMA: entry
Species	Human	Mouse
Entrez	3812	245615
Ensembl	ENSG00000275629; ENSG00000275838; ENSG00000277709; ENSG00000273735; ENSG00000284192 ENSG00000276004; ENSG00000278361; ENSG00000284046; ENSG00000278442; ENSG00000275416; ENSG00000275626; ENSG00000284295; ENSG00000278707; ENSG00000278758; ENSG00000278656; ENSG00000278850; ENSG00000284213; ENSG00000276424; ENSG00000284528; ENSG00000277982; ENSG00000274722; ENSG00000278726; ENSG00000275511; ENSG00000275083; ENSG00000273911; ENSG00000283975; ENSG00000276357; ENSG00000278809; ENSG00000277181; ENSG00000284384; ENSG00000283951; ENSG00000278403; ENSG00000275262; ENSG00000278710; ENSG00000275566; ENSG00000284063; ENSG00000276882; ENSG00000240403; ENSG00000276739; ENSG00000284466; ENSG00000278474; ENSG00000284381; ENSG00000288389	ENSMUSG00000057439
UniProt	P43630; Q8NHI6	Q673W2
RefSeq (mRNA)	NM_001242867; NM_006737	NM_177748
RefSeq (protein)	NP_001229796; NP_006728; NP_001229796.1	NP_808416
Location (UCSC)	Chr 19: 54.85 – 54.87 Mb	Chr X: 135.35 – 135.44 Mb
PubMed search
- Wikidata
View/Edit Human	View/Edit Mouse

Killer cell immunoglobulin-like receptor 3DL2 is a protein that in humans is encoded by the KIR3DL2 gene.

== Structure ==
Killer cell immunoglobulin-like receptors (KIRs) are transmembrane glycoproteins expressed on natural killer (NK) cells and subsets of T cells. KIR proteins are classified based on the number of extracellular immunoglobulin (Ig) domains—either two (2D) or three (3D)—and the length of their cytoplasmic tails: long (L) or short (S).

KIR3DL2 is a member of the 3DL family, containing three Ig-like domains and a long cytoplasmic tail. The long tail includes one or more immune tyrosine-based inhibitory motifs (ITIMs), which mediate inhibitory signaling upon ligand engagement. In contrast, KIRs with short cytoplasmic tails lack ITIMs and instead signal through association with TYRO protein tyrosine kinase binding protein, resulting in activating signals.

The KIR genes are polymorphic and highly homologous, clustered on chromosome 19q13.4 within the 1 Mb leukocyte receptor complex (LRC). The gene content of this cluster varies among haplotypes, but several "framework" genes—including KIR3DL2—are found in all haplotypes.

== Function ==
KIR3DL2 is involved in the regulation of innate immune responses, primarily through its expression on NK cells and γδ T cells, a subset of non-MHC-I-restricted T cells.

The ligand for KIR3DL2 includes subsets of HLA class I molecules, and interaction with these ligands typically transduces inhibitory signals that suppress NK cell-mediated cytotoxicity. In addition, the protein IGSF8 (Immunoglobulin superfamily member 8) has been identified as a binding partner of KIR3DL2. Engagement of KIR3DL2 by IGSF8 functions as an immune checkpoint that inhibits NK cell cytotoxic activity, highlighting its role in immune evasion mechanisms in cancer.

== See also ==
- Cluster of differentiation
