= V-set and immunoglobulin domain containing 4 =

Protein-coding gene in the species Homo sapiens

VSIG4

Identifiers
- Aliases: VSIG4, CRIg, Z39IG, V-set and immunoglobulin domain containing 4
- External IDs: OMIM: 300353; MGI: 2679720; GeneCards: VSIG4
Available structures
PDB	Ortholog search: PDBe RCSB
PDB	List of PDB id codes 2ICC, 2ICE, 2ICF

Gene location (Human)
Chr.	X chromosome (human)
Band	Xq12	Start	66,021,738 bp
Band	Xq12	End	66,040,125 bp

Gene location (Mouse)
Chr.	X chromosome (mouse)
Band	X|X C3	Start	95,290,809 bp
Band	X|X C3	End	95,337,044 bp
RNA expression pattern
Bgee	Human / Mouse (ortholog); Top expressed in: right lung; lower lobe of lung; gastric mucosa; right coronary artery; right adrenal cortex; synovial membrane; upper lobe of lung; upper lobe of left lung; synovial joint; visceral pleura / Top expressed in: stroma of bone marrow; ankle; liver; left lobe of liver; myocardium of ventricle; tibiofemoral joint; granulocyte; muscle of thigh; aorta; skin of external ear; More reference expression data
BioGPS	n/a
Gene ontology
Molecular function	protein binding; complement component C3b binding
Cellular component	integral component of membrane; membrane; protein-containing complex
Biological process	innate immune response; complement activation, alternative pathway; immune system process; negative regulation of interleukin-2 production; negative regulation of T cell proliferation; negative regulation of macrophage activation; negative regulation of complement activation, alternative pathway
Sources:Amigo / QuickGO
Orthologs
Databases	NCBI: entry; OMA: entry
Species	Human	Mouse
Entrez	11326	278180
Ensembl	ENSG00000155659	ENSMUSG00000044206
UniProt	Q9Y279	F6TUL9
RefSeq (mRNA)	NM_007268; NM_001100431; NM_001184830; NM_001184831; NM_001257403	NM_177789
RefSeq (protein)	NP_001093901; NP_001171759; NP_001171760; NP_001244332; NP_009199	NP_808457
Location (UCSC)	Chr X: 66.02 – 66.04 Mb	Chr X: 95.29 – 95.34 Mb
PubMed search
- Wikidata
View/Edit Human	View/Edit Mouse

V-set and immunoglobulin domain containing 4 is a protein that in humans is encoded by the VSIG4 gene.

== Function ==
This gene encodes a v-set and immunoglobulin-domain containing protein that is structurally related to the B7 family of immune regulatory proteins. The encoded protein may be a negative regulator of T-cell responses. This protein is also a receptor for the complement component 3 fragments C3b and iC3b. Alternate splicing results in multiple transcript variants.
