= KIR3DL3 =

Protein-coding gene in the species Homo sapiens

Identifiers
- Aliases: KIR3DL3, CD158Z, KIR3DL7, KIR44, KIRC1, KIR2DS2, killer cell immunoglobulin like receptor, three Ig domains and long cytoplasmic tail 3
- External IDs: OMIM: 610095; MGI: 3612791; GeneCards: KIR3DL3

Gene location (Human)
Chr.	Chromosome 19 (human)
Band	19q13.42	Start	54,724,442 bp
Band	19q13.42	End	54,736,632 bp

Gene location (Mouse)
Chr.	X chromosome (mouse)
Band	X F1|X 58.45 cM	Start	135,348,856 bp
Band	X F1|X 58.45 cM	End	135,444,805 bp
RNA expression pattern
Bgee	Human / Mouse (ortholog); Top expressed in: testicle; muscle of thigh; blood / Top expressed in: zone of skin; hypothalamus; spermatid; placenta; More reference expression data
BioGPS	n/a
Orthologs
Databases	NCBI: entry; OMA: entry
Species	Human	Mouse
Entrez	115653	245615
Ensembl	ENSG00000274394; ENSG00000283823; ENSG00000274511; ENSG00000276196; ENSG00000275433 ENSG00000276086; ENSG00000283875; ENSG00000274480; ENSG00000277392; ENSG00000274786; ENSG00000274724; ENSG00000276930; ENSG00000276572; ENSG00000284371; ENSG00000276084; ENSG00000284104; ENSG00000278729; ENSG00000277028; ENSG00000275062; ENSG00000274763; ENSG00000276433; ENSG00000274639; ENSG00000283966; ENSG00000284127; ENSG00000277552; ENSG00000278490; ENSG00000276806; ENSG00000242019; ENSG00000276328; ENSG00000276875; ENSG00000274556; ENSG00000283915; ENSG00000284086; ENSG00000278723; ENSG00000284480; ENSG00000273502; ENSG00000274254; ENSG00000275172; ENSG00000275513; ENSG00000277620; ENSG00000274696; ENSG00000277596	ENSMUSG00000057439
UniProt	Q8N743	Q673W2
RefSeq (mRNA)	NM_153443	NM_177748
RefSeq (protein)	NP_703144	NP_808416
Location (UCSC)	Chr 19: 54.72 – 54.74 Mb	Chr X: 135.35 – 135.44 Mb
PubMed search
- Wikidata
View/Edit Human	View/Edit Mouse

Killer cell immunoglobulin-like receptor 3DL3 is a protein that in humans is encoded by the KIR3DL3 gene.

Killer cell immunoglobulin-like receptors (KIRs) are transmembrane glycoproteins expressed by natural killer cells and subsets of T cells. The KIR genes are polymorphic and highly homologous and they are found in a cluster on chromosome 19q13.4 within the 1 Mb leukocyte receptor complex (LRC). The gene content of the KIR gene cluster varies among haplotypes, although several "framework" genes are found in all haplotypes (KIR3DL3, KIR3DP1, KIR2DL4, KIR3DL2). The KIR proteins are classified by the number of extracellular immunoglobulin domains (2D or 3D) and by whether they have a long (L) or short (S) cytoplasmic domain. KIR proteins with the long cytoplasmic domain transduce inhibitory signals upon ligand binding via an immune tyrosine-based inhibitory motif (ITIM), while KIR proteins with the short cytoplasmic domain lack the ITIM motif and instead associate with the TYRO protein tyrosine kinase binding protein to transduce activating signals. The ligands for several KIR proteins are subsets of HLA class I molecules; thus, KIR proteins are thought to play an important role in regulation of the immune response. This gene is one of the "framework" loci that is present on all haplotypes.
