= Killer-cell immunoglobulin-like receptor =

Family of receptors found on NK cells

Identifiers
- Symbol: KIR
- Membranome: 18

Killer-cell immunoglobulin-like receptors (KIRs) are a family of type I transmembrane glycoproteins expressed on the plasma membrane of natural killer (NK) cells and a minority of T cells. In humans, they are encoded in the leukocyte receptor complex (LRC) on chromosome 19q13.4; the KIR region is approximately 150 kilobases and contains 14 loci, including seven protein-coding genes (some duplicated) and two pseudogenes. NK cells in humans use the KIRs to the perturbations from self-HLA class I molecules present on infected or HLA-disparate fetal transplants. The KIR receptors were originally defined serologically by the Moretta groups in the early 1990s.

They regulate the killing function of these cells by interacting with major histocompatibility (MHC) class I molecules, which are expressed on all nucleated cell types. KIR receptors can distinguish between MHC I allelic variants, which allows them to detect virally infected cells or transformed cells. KIRs are paired receptors, meaning some have activating and others have inhibitory functions; most KIRs are inhibitory: their recognition of MHC molecules suppresses the cytotoxic activity of their NK cell. The receptors collaborate to monitor and respond to the changes in HLA class I antigen on cells of the body.

A limited number of KIRs are activating: their recognition of MHC molecules activates the cytotoxic activity of their cell. Initial expression of KIRs on NK cells is stochastic, but NK cells undergo an educational process as they mature that alters the KIR expression to maximize the balance between effective defense and self-tolerance. KIR's role in killing unhealthy self-cells and not killing healthy self-cells, involves them in protection against and propensity to viral infections such as HIV, HCV, autoimmune disease, and cancer. KIR molecules are polymorphic: their gene sequences differ greatly across individuals. They are also polygenic so that it is rare for two unrelated individuals to possess the same KIR genotype.

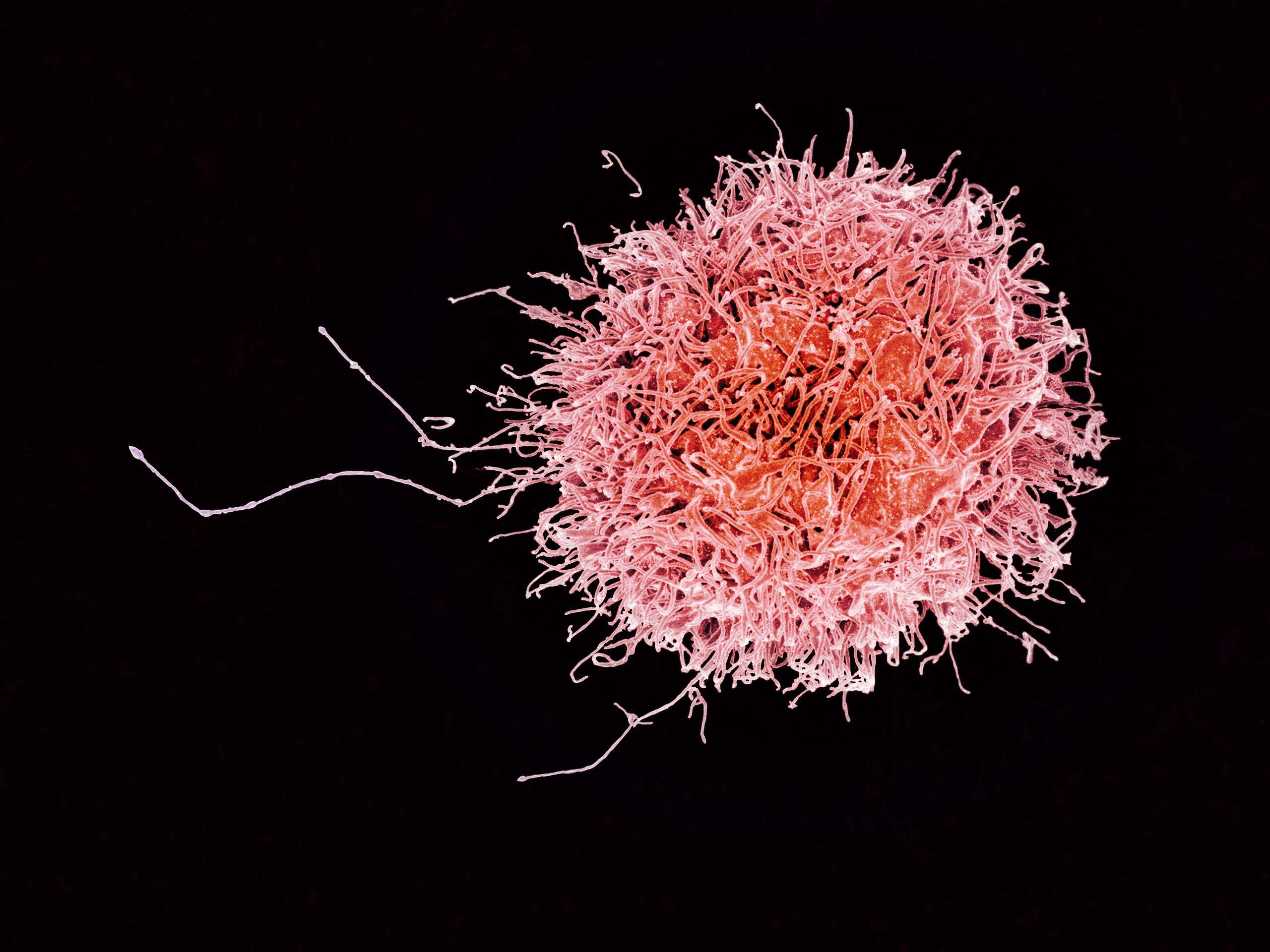
This is a picture of a live Natural Killer Cell in the human body.

Unlike T lymphocytes, resting NK cells use preformed lytic granules to kill target cells, implying a rapid cytolytic effect that requires a finely regulated control mechanism. The ability to spare normal tissues, but not transformed cells, is termed the "missing self" hypothesis. This phenomenon is determined by MHC class I–specific inhibitory receptors that functionally dominate the triggering potentials induced by activating receptors. Thus, NK cells use a complex array of inhibitory or activating receptor/ligand interactions, the balance of which regulates NK cell function and cytolytic activity. Receptors displaying this function evolved during phylogenesis following the rapid evolution of genes coding for MHC class I molecules. Thus, in primates and a few other species, evolved MHC class I–inhibitory receptors belong to the KIR immunoglobulin superfamily, while in rodents and other species the same function is under the control of type II integral transmembrane glycoproteins, structurally characterized as disulfide-linked homodimers belonging to the Ly49 protein family. The factors controlling and regulating KIR expression on NK cells are not well understood. It is accepted that tolerance is a major driving force. Tolerance is a fundamental feature of the immune system and is required to prevent a system designed for attack from damaging itself.

This is an image of the protein KIR2DS4.

== Function ==
=== Role in natural killer cells ===
Natural killer (NK) cells are a type of lymphocyte cell involved in the innate immune system's response to viral infection and tumor transformation of host cells. Like T cells, NK cells have many qualities characteristic of the adaptive immune system, including the production of “memory” cells that persist following encounter with antigens and the ability to create a secondary recall response. Unlike T cells, NK cell receptors are germline encoded, and therefore do not require somatic gene rearrangements. Because NK cells target self cells, they have an intricate mechanism by which they differentiate self and non-self cells in order to minimize the destruction of healthy cells and maximize the destruction of unhealthy cells.

Natural killer cell cytolysis of target cells and cytokine production is controlled by a balance of inhibitory and activating signals, which are facilitated by NK cell receptors. NK cell inhibitory receptors are part of either the immunoglobulin-like (IgSF) superfamily or the C-type lectin-like receptor (CTLR) superfamily. Members of the IgSF family include the human killer cell immunoglobulin-like receptor (KIR) and the Immunoglobulin-like transcripts (ILT). CTLR inhibitory receptors include the CD94/NKG2A and the murine Ly49, which is probably analogous to the human KIR.

=== Role in T cells ===
KIR and CD94 (CTLR) receptors are expressed by 5% of peripheral blood T cells. Killer immunoglobulin-like receptors on T cells have the function of signaling T cell activation. The KIRs are expressed on CD8+ T cells and will interact with the human leukocyte antigen (HLA) class I molecules on cells. The KIRs can signal the inhibitory or activate the signaling of the T cell and its ability to kill the foreign cells.

== Nomenclature and classification ==
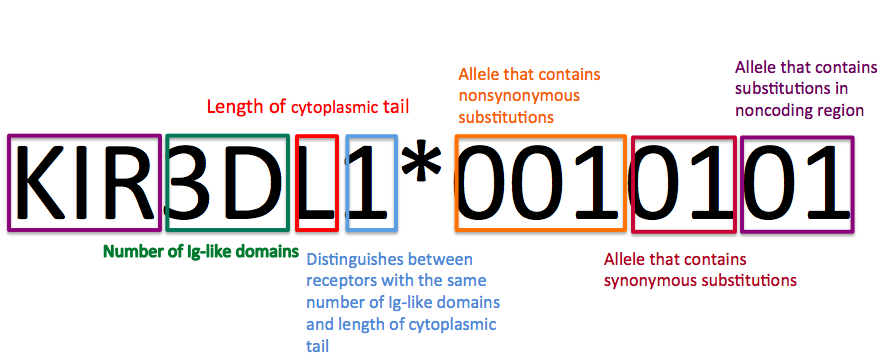

KIR receptors are named based on the number of their extracellular Ig-like domains (2D or 3D) and by the length of their cytoplasmic tail (long (L), short (S), or pseudogene (P)). The number following the L, S, or P in the case of a pseudogene, differentiates KIR receptors with the same number of extracellular domains and length of cytoplasmic tail. Finally, the asterisk after this nomenclature indicates allelic variants.

Single substitutions, insertions, or deletions in the genetic material that encodes KIR receptors changes the site of termination for the gene, causing the cytoplasmic tail to be long or short, depending on the site of the stop codon. These single nucleotide alterations in the nucleotide sequence fundamentally alter KIR function. With the exception of KIR2DL4, which has both activating and inhibitory capabilities, KIR receptors with long cytoplasmic tails are inhibitory and those with short tails are activating.

== Receptor types ==
=== Inhibitory receptors ===
Inhibitory receptors recognize self-MHC class I molecules on target self cells, causing the activation of signaling pathways that stop the cytolytic function of NK cells. Self-MHC class I molecules are always expressed under normal circumstance. According to the missing-self hypothesis, inhibitory KIR receptors recognize the downregulation of MHC class I molecules in virally-infected or transformed self cells, leading these receptors to stop sending the inhibition signal, which then leads to the lysis of these unhealthy cells. Because natural killer cells target virally infected host cells and tumor cells, inhibitory KIR receptors are important in facilitating self-tolerance.

KIR inhibitory receptors signal through their immunoreceptor tyrosine-based inhibitory motif (ITIM) in their cytoplasmic domain. When inhibitory KIR receptors bind to a ligand, their ITIMs are tyrosine phosphorylated and protein tyrosine phosphatases, including SHP-1, are recruited. Killer-cell immunoglobulin-like receptors initiate intracellular signaling pathways through NK cell behavior. The ITIMs are phosphorylated by the Src family kinases such as Lck and Fyn. The phosphatases dephosphorylate signals intermediates which blocks the activation and suppresses the cytotoxicity. It allows the natural killer cells to be deactivated when being in the presence of the healthy cells that are expressed in MHC class I levels. Activating KIRs will rely on the DAP12 which is an adaptor molecule that will contain immunoreceptor tyrosine-based activation motifs (ITAMs). KIRs contain a positively charged lysine in the transmembrane which can form a salt bridge with the negatively charged DAP12's acid and the ligand can signal to the tyrosine kinases such as SYK and ZAP-70 to create more activation signals. The activation signals would then lead to degranulation, cytokine production and the destruction of the target cells. The NK cell will only make a response depending how the inhibitory and activating signals work out, but the inhibitory signals have an overpower over the activating signals which will result in defense against cytotoxicity. Inhibition occurs early in the activation signaling pathway, likely through the interference of the pathway by these phosphatases.

=== Activating receptors ===
Activating receptors recognize ligands that indicate host cell aberration, including induced-self antigens (which are markers of infected self cells and include MICA, MICB, and ULBP, all of which are related to MHC class 1 molecules), altered-self antigens (MHC class I antigens laden with foreign peptide), and/or non-self (pathogen encoded molecules). The binding of activating KIR receptors to these molecules causes the activation of signaling pathways that cause NK cells to lyse virally infected or transformed cells.

Activating receptors do not have the immunoreceptor tyrosine-base inhibition motif (ITIM) characteristic of inhibitory receptors, and instead contain a positively charged lysine or arginine residue in their transmembrane domain (with the exception of KIR2L4) that helps to bind DAP12, an adaptor molecule containing a negatively charged residue as well as immunoreceptor tyrosine-based activation motifs (ITAM). Activating KIR receptors include KIR2DS, and KIR3DS.

Much less is known about activating receptors compared to inhibitory receptors. A significant proportion of the human population lacks activating KIR receptors on the surface of their NK cells as a result of truncated variants of KIR2DS4 and 2DL4, which are not expressed on the cell surface, in individuals who are heterozygous for the KIR group A haplotype. This suggests that a lack of activating KIR receptors is not incredibly detrimental, likely because there are other families of activating NK cell surface receptors that bind MHC class I molecules that are probably expressed in individuals with this phenotype. Because little is known about the function of activating KIR receptors, however, it is possible that there is an important function of activating KIR receptors of which we are not yet aware.

Activating receptors have lower affinity for their ligands than do inhibitory receptors. Although the purpose of this difference in affinity is unknown, it is possible that the cytolysis of target cells occurs preferentially under conditions in which the expression of stimulating MHC class I molecules on target cells is high, which may occur during viral infection. This difference, which is also present in Ly49, the murine homolog to KIR, tips the balance towards self-tolerance.

=== Expression ===
Activating and inhibitory KIR receptors are expressed on NK cells in patchy, variegated combinations, leading to distinct NK cells. KIR gene expression is regulated by mechanisms of DNA methylation. The HLA class I regulated control of NK cell function can be exploited in an allogeneic bone marrow transplantation setting to eradicate acute myeloid leukemias.The IgSF and CTLR superfamily inhibitory receptors expressed on the surface of NK cells are each expressed on a subset of NK cells in such a way that not all classes of inhibitory NK cell receptors are expressed on each NK cell, but there is some overlap. This creates unique repertories of NK cells, increasing the specificity with which NK cells recognize virally-infected and transformed self-cells. Expression of KIR receptors is determined primarily by genetic factors, but recent studies have found that epigenetic mechanisms also play a role in KIR receptor expression. Activating and inhibitory KIR receptors that recognize the same class I MHC molecule are mostly not expressed by the same NK cell. This pattern of expression is beneficial in that target cells that lack inhibitory MHC molecules but express activating MHC molecules are extremely sensitive to cytolysis.

Although initial expression of inhibitory and activating receptors on NK cells appears to be stochastic, there is an education process based on MHC class I alleles expressed by the host that determines the final repertoire of NK receptor expression. This process of education is not well understood. Different receptor genes are expressed primarily independently of other receptor genes, which substantiates the idea that initial expression of receptors is stochastic. Receptors are not expressed entirely independently of each other, however, which supports the idea that there is an education process that reduces the amount of randomness associated with receptor expression. Further, once an NK receptor gene is activated in a cell, its expression is maintained for many cell generations. It appears that some proportion of NK cells are developmentally immature and therefore lack inhibitory receptors, making them hyporesponsive to target cells. In the human fetal liver, KIR and CD49 receptors are already expressed by NK cells, indicating that at least some KIR receptors are present in fetal NK cells, although more studies are needed to substantiate this idea. Although the induction of NK receptor expression is not fully understood, one study found that human progenitor cells cultured in vitro with cytokines developed into NK cells, and many of these cells expressed CD94/NKG2A receptors, a CTLR receptor. Moreover, there was little to no KIR receptor expression in these cells, so additional signals are clearly required for KIR induction.

The balance between effective defense and self-tolerance is important to the functioning of NK cells. It is thought that NK cell self-tolerance is regulated by the educational process of receptor expression described above, although the exact mechanism is not known. The “at least one” hypothesis is an attractive, though not yet fully substantiated, hypothesis that tries to explain the way in which self-tolerance is regulated in the education process. This hypothesis posits that the NK cell repertoire is regulated so that at least one inhibitory receptor (either of the IgSF or CTLR superfamily) is present on every NK cell, which would ensure self-tolerance. Effective defense requires an opposing pattern of receptor expression. The co-expression of many MHC-specific receptors by NK cells is disfavored, likely because cells that co-express receptors are less able to attack virally infected or transformed cells that have down-regulated or lost one MHC molecule compared to NK cells that co-express receptors to a lesser degree. Minimization of co-expression, therefore, is important for mounting an effective defense by maximizing the sensitivity of response.

== Evolution of KIRs across species ==
KIRs are a prime example of the species-specific immune adaptation which in primates the inhibitory MHC class I receptors will evolve within the immunoglobulin superfamily as the KIRs. Rodents such as mice use a different type of inhibitory NK receptors which are the Ly-49 receptors, and they are part of the C-type lectin-like receptor superfamily. The Ly-49 have the function of recognizing the MHC class I molecules to bring the NK cell activity back to homeostasis. This is how the convergent evolution works. The rapid evolution of the MHC class I molecules has driven the diversity of KIR genes. This is proof for the Red Queen hypothesis, an evolutionary theory proposing that species must constantly adapt and evolve to survive against the ever-evolving opposing species. In animals, both KIRs and MHC class I genes keep adapting in response to each other so that each species can survive.

Not all mammals possess the KIRs as pigs do not have expanded KIR locus. The KIR expansion is independent and varies in animal lineages with the possible influence of the species-specific environment.

== Structure ==
=== Gene structure ===
The KIR gene cluster has approximately 150 kb and is located in the leukocyte receptor complex (LRC) on human chromosome 19q13.4. KIR genes have 9 exons, which are strongly correlated with KIR receptor protein domains (leader, D0, D1, and D2, stem, transmembrane, and cytosolic domains). Furthermore, the promoter regions of the KIR genes share greater than 90% sequence identity, which indicates that there is similar transcriptional regulation of KIR genes.

The human killer cell immunoglobulin-like receptors superfamily (which share 35–50% sequence identity and the same fold as KIR) includes immunoglobulin-like transcripts (ILT, also known as leukocyte immunoglobulin-like receptors (LIRs)), leukocyte-associated Ig-like receptors (LAIR), paired Ig-like receptors (PIR), and gp49. Moreover, it has been reported that between 12 and 17 KIR receptors have been identified. There was a single ancestral gene from which all extant KIR receptor genes arose via duplications, recombinations, and mutations, and all KIR receptors share more than 90% sequence identity.

==== Genes ====
- two domains, long cytoplasmic tail: KIR2DL1, KIR2DL2, KIR2DL3, KIR2DL4, KIR2DL5A, KIR2DL5B,
- two domains, short cytoplasmic tail: KIR2DS1, KIR2DS2, KIR2DS3, KIR2DS4, KIR2DS5
- three domains, long cytoplasmic tail: KIR3DL1, KIR3DL2, KIR3DL3
- three domains, short cytoplasmic tail: KIR3DS1List of the 16 KIR genes

KIR gene	Signalling	Ligand	Antibody
2DL1	Inhibitory	HLA-C2	EB6, HP-MA4
2DL3 (including 2 DL2)	Inhibitory	HLA-C1	GL183, DX27
2DL4	Activatory	HLA-G	mAb 33
2DL5	Inhibitory	not known	UP-R1
3DL1	Inhibitory	HLA-Bw4	DX9, Z27, 5.133
3DL2	Inhibitory	HLA-A3, A11	DX31, 5.133, Q66
2DS1	Activatory	HLA-C2	EB6
2DS2	Activatory	HLA-C1	GL183, DX27
2DS3	Activatory	not known	none
2DS4	Activatory	not known	5.133
2DS5	Activatory	not known	none
3DS1	Activatory	HLA-Bw4?	Z27
3DL3	Not known	not known	CH21
2DP1, 3DP1	Not expressed		

=== Protein structure ===
NK cell receptors bind directly to the MHC class I molecules on the surface of target cells. Human killer cell immunoglobulin-like receptors recognize the α1 and α2 domains of class I human leukocyte antigens (HLA-A, -B, and –C), which are the human versions of MHCs. Position 44 in the D1 domain of KIR receptors and position 80 in HLA-C are important for the specificity of KIR-HLA binding.

=== Influence on KIR2DS1^{+} NK cells ===
The extracellular domains of several activating KIRs, including KIR2DS1, are highly homologous to their inhibitory counterparts, making it hard to generate antibodies that specifically recognize only the activating form of a KIR. The scientists used the competing properties of 2 commercial mAbs to distinguish KIR2DS1^{+} cells from KIR2DL1^{+} cells. They first incubated PBMCs with an anti-KIR2DL1–specific mAb (clone 143211), before adding a mAb cross-reactive with KIR2DL1 and KIR2DS1 (clone EB6). The staining procedure partially blocked binding of EB6 to KIR2DL1 on freshly isolated human NK cells and allowed them, for the first time, to detect expression of all combinations of KIR2DL1 and KIR2DS1. The specificity of staining by these antibodies was confirmed by real-time PCR-analysis of KIR2DL1 and KIR2DS1 mRNA expression in sorted populations of KIR2DS1^{+}KIR2DL1^{−}, KIR2DS1^{+}KIR2DL1^{+}, KIR2DS1^{−}KIR2DL1^{+}, and KIR2DS1^{−}KIR2DL1^{−} NK cells.

== Diversity ==
=== Allelic diversity ===
All but two KIR genes (KIR2DP1 and KIR3DL3) have multiple alleles, with KIR3DL2 and KIR3DL1 having the most variations (12 and 11, respectively). In total, as of 2012 there were 614 known KIR nucleotide sequences encoding 321 distinct KIR proteins. Further, inhibitory receptors are more polymorphic than activating receptors. The great majority (69%) of substitutions in the KIR DNA sequence are nonsynonymous, and 31% are synonymous. The ratio of nonsynonymous to synonymous substitutions (dN/dS) is greater than one for every KIR and every KIR domain, indicating that positive selection is occurring. Further, the 5′ exons, which encode the leader peptide and the Ig-like domains, have a larger proportion of nonsynonymous substitutions than do the 3′ exons, which encode the stem, transmembrane region, and the cytoplasmic tail. This indicates that stronger selection is occurring on the 5′ exons, which encodes the extracellular part of the KIR that binds to the MHC. There is, therefore, evidence of strong selection on the KIR ligand binding sites, which is consistent with the high specificity of the KIR ligand binding site, as well as the rapid evolution of class I MHC molecules and viruses.

=== Genotype and haplotype diversity ===
Human genomes differ in their amount of KIR genes, in their proportion of inhibitory versus activating genes, and in their allelic variations of each gene. As a result of these polygenic and polymorphic variations, less than 2% of unrelated individuals have the same KIR genotype, and ethnic populations have broadly different KIR genotype frequencies. This incredible diversity likely reflects the pressure from rapidly evolving viruses. 30 distinct haplotypes have been classified, all of which can be broadly characterized by group A and group B haplotypes. The Group A haplotype has a fixed set of genes, which are KIR3DL3, 2L3, 2DP1, 2DL1, 3DP1, 2DL4, 3DL1, 2DS4, and 3DL2. Group B haplotypes encompass all other haplotypes, and therefore have a variable set of genes, including several genes absent from group A, including KIR2DS1, 2DS2, 2DS3, 2DS5, 2DL2, 2DL5, and 3DS1. Because group B has both gene and allelic diversity (compared to just allelic diversity in group A), group B is even more diverse than group A. Four KIR genes (2DL4, 3DL2, 3DL3, AND 3DP1) are present in nearly all KIR haplotypes and as a result are known as framework genes. Inheritance of maternal and paternal haplotypes results in further diversity of individual KIR genotype.

Group A only has one activating KIR receptor, whereas Group B contains many activating KIR receptors, and as a result group B haplotype carriers have a stronger response to virally infected and transformed cells. As a result of the huge migrations peoples indigenous to India, Australia, and the Americas made from Africa, activating KIR receptors became advantageous to these populations, and as a result these populations acquired activating KIR receptors.

A study of the genotypes of 989 individuals representing eight distinct populations found 111 distinct KIR genotypes. Individuals with the most frequent genotype, which comprised 27% of the individuals studied, are homozygous for the group A haplotype. The remaining 110 KIR genotypes found in this study are either group A and group B heterozygotes or group B homozygotes (who are indistinguishable from heterozygotes by genotype alone). 41% (46) of the genotypes identified were found in only one individual, and 90% of individuals had the same 40 genotypes. Clearly, there is extensive diversity in human KIR genotypes, which allows for rapid evolution in response to rapidly evolving viruses.

== Role in disease ==
Genotypes that are inhibitory KIR receptor dominant are likely susceptible to infection and reproductive disorders but protective against autoimmune diseases, whereas activating KIR receptor dominant genotypes are likely susceptible to autoimmunity but protective against viral infection and cancer. The relationship between inhibitory vs stimulatory KIR genotype dominance, however, is more complicated than this because diseases are so diverse and have so many different causes, and immune activation or de-activation may not be protective or harmful at every stage of disease. KIR2DS2 or 2DS1, which are activating receptors, are strongly correlated with most autoimmune diseases, which is logical because activating receptors induce signaling pathways that lead to cytolysis of target cells. Another activating receptor, KIR3DS1, is protective to hepatitis-C virus infection, is associated with slowing down of AIDs progression, and is associated with cervical cancer, which is associated with a distinct strain of HPV. It is likely that KIR3DS1 is associated with cervical cancer despite its stimulatory nature because cervical tumors generally associate with localized inflammation.

== As a drug target ==
1-7F9 is a human monoclonal antibody that binds to KIR2DL1/2L3. Very similar Lirilumab is intended for the treatment of cancers e.g. leukemia.

== Use of KIRs in CAR T Cell Therapy ==
The Killer-cell immunoglobulin-like receptors (KIR) are being explored as an alternative activation method in CAR T cell therapy. Unlike the traditional approach that utilizes T cell receptors, incorporating KIRs into CAR T cells aims to exploit the cytotoxic properties and regulatory functions of natural killer (NK) cells. Essentially this method is aimed to mimic Natural Killer cell function to help their natural ability to kill cells with missing MHC class I expression. This method is under investigation for its potential to enhance the targeting and destruction of cancer cells, with the goal of addressing limitations seen in current CAR T cell therapies, such as off-target effects and resistance. Research is ongoing to determine the effectiveness and safety of using KIR-based activation in CAR T cell treatments.

=== Role in cancer immunotherapy ===
KIR-targeted therapies are a continuously evolving field in cancer immunotherapy and in cancers where the natural killer cells play a major role in the immune system such as in leukemia and lymphoma. Natural Killer cells can be released to kill tumor cells and block the inhibitory KIRs that would invade the immune response. One of the most focused agents is the Lirilumab (IPH2102) which is a monoclonal antibody that binds to KIR2DL1, KIR2Dl2, AND KIR2DL3 which prevents their interaction with HLA-C ligands on tumor cells. Studies has shown that KIR blockage can actually enhance the Natural Killer cell-mediated cytotoxicity and cytokine production. The Lirilumab has been tested alongside other checkpoint inhibitors like nivolumab which is anti-PD-1 in patients with solid tumors and the results have come out mixed but are suggesting that dual checkpoint blockade could improve efficiency over monotherapies.

There is also another approach in engineering the Natural Killer cells directly and using gene editing technology like CRISPR/Cas9 to knock out inhibitory KIRs or help improve the activation of KIR expression. Engineered Natural Killer cells from donors or made from induced pluripotent stem cells (iPSCs) are still being developed but could help make a shift towards collecting innate immunity in cancer treatment along with the other methods as either monotherapy or in already existing immunotherapies. Research that is being done with KIR-targeted therapies and its effect on cancer patients. The Killer Immunoglobulin Receptor targeted therapies are still in its early stages of being worked on and scientists are still conducting studies with it for existing cancer patients and patients suffering with advanced solid tumors in their system.

== See also ==
- NK-92, a natural killer cell line that does not express KIR
