= CD155 =

Protein found in humans

PVR
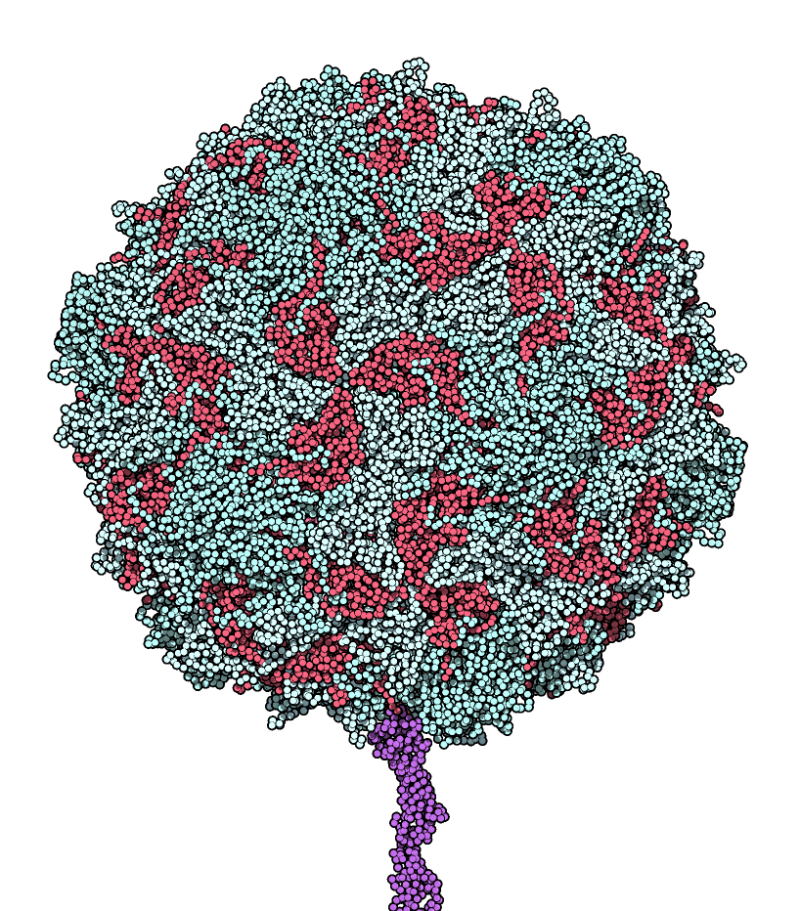

Identifiers
- Aliases: PVR, CD155, HVED, NECL5, Necl-5, PVS, TAGE4, poliovirus receptor, PVR cell adhesion molecule
- External IDs: OMIM: 173850; GeneCards: PVR
Available structures
PDB	Human UniProt search: PDBe RCSB
PDB	List of PDB id codes 4FQP, 1DGI, 1NN8, 3EPC, 3EPD, 3EPF, 3J8F, 3J9F, 3UDW, 3URO

Gene location (Human)
Chr.	Chromosome 19 (human)
Band	19q13.31	Start	44,643,798 bp
Band	19q13.31	End	44,666,162 bp
RNA expression pattern
Bgee	Human / Mouse (ortholog); Top expressed in: stromal cell of endometrium; islet of Langerhans; tendon of biceps brachii; left ventricle; apex of heart; right lobe of liver; upper lobe of left lung; anterior pituitary; left adrenal gland; right auricle of heart / n/a; More reference expression data
BioGPS	n/a
Gene ontology
Molecular function	protein homodimerization activity; virus receptor activity; protein binding; signaling receptor binding; cell adhesion molecule binding; signaling receptor activity
Cellular component	cytoplasm; integral component of membrane; membrane; focal adhesion; plasma membrane; integral component of plasma membrane; extracellular region; cell surface; extracellular exosome; extracellular space
Biological process	heterophilic cell-cell adhesion via plasma membrane cell adhesion molecules; cell recognition; susceptibility to natural killer cell mediated cytotoxicity; cell adhesion; positive regulation of natural killer cell mediated cytotoxicity directed against tumor cell target; regulation of immune response; viral entry into host cell; susceptibility to T cell mediated cytotoxicity; viral process; adherens junction organization; positive regulation of natural killer cell mediated cytotoxicity; homophilic cell adhesion via plasma membrane adhesion molecules
Sources:Amigo / QuickGO
Orthologs
Databases	NCBI: entry; OMA: entry
Species	Human	Mouse
Entrez	5817	n/a
Ensembl	ENSG00000073008	n/a
UniProt	P15151	n/a
RefSeq (mRNA)	NM_001135768; NM_001135769; NM_001135770; NM_006505	n/a
RefSeq (protein)	NP_001129240; NP_001129241; NP_001129242; NP_006496	n/a
Location (UCSC)	Chr 19: 44.64 – 44.67 Mb	n/a
PubMed search		n/a
- Wikidata
View/Edit Human

CD155 (cluster of differentiation 155), also known as the poliovirus receptor, is a protein that in humans is encoded by the PVR gene. It is a transmembrane protein that is involved in forming junctions between neighboring cells. It is also the molecule that poliovirus uses to enter cells. The gene is specific to the primates.

== Function ==
CD155 is a Type I transmembrane glycoprotein in the immunoglobulin superfamily. Its normal cellular function is in the establishment of intercellular adherens junctions between epithelial cells.

The external domain mediates cell attachment to the extracellular matrix molecule vitronectin, while its intracellular domain interacts with the dynein light chain Tctex-1/DYNLT1.

The role of CD155 in the immune system is unclear, though it may be involved in intestinal humoral immune responses. Subsequent data has also suggested that CD155 may also be used to positively select MHC-independent T cells in the thymus.

=== Polio ===
Commonly known as Poliovirus Receptor (PVR), the protein serves as a cellular receptor for poliovirus in the first step of poliovirus replication. Transgenic mice that express the PVR gene have been constructed in order to study polio experimentally.

== Structure ==
CD155 is a transmembrane protein with 3 extracellular immunoglobulin-like domains, D1-D3, where D1 is recognized by the virus.

Low resolution structures of CD155 complexed with poliovirus have been obtained using electron microscopy while a high resolution structures of the ectodomain D1 and D2 of CD155 were solved by x-ray crystallography.
