= PILRB =

Protein-coding gene in the species Homo sapiens

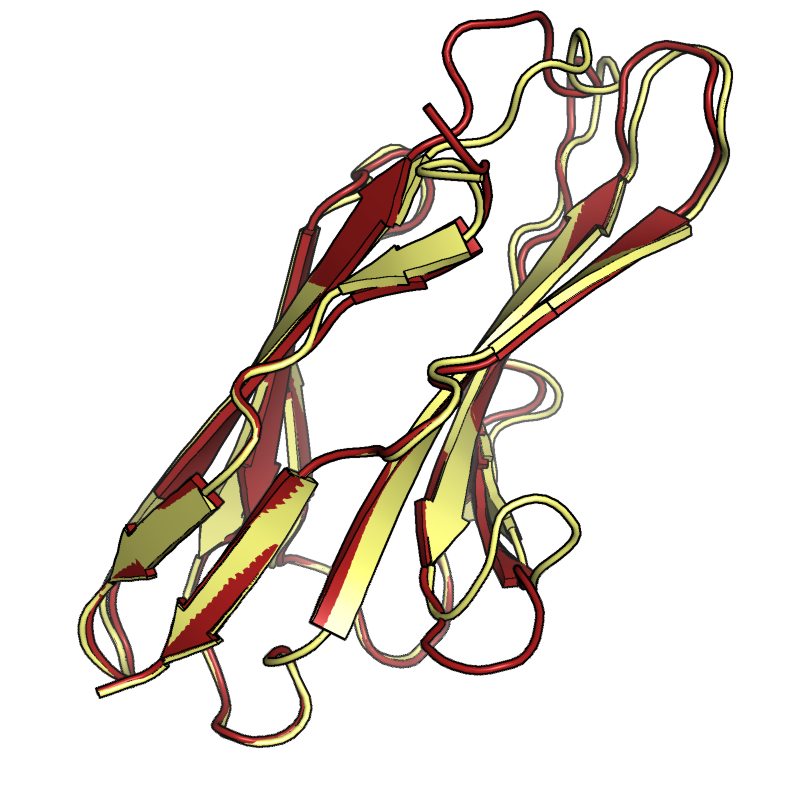

Identifiers
- Aliases: PILRB, FDFACT1, FDFACT2, paired immunoglobin-like type 2 receptor beta, paired immunoglobin like type 2 receptor beta
- External IDs: OMIM: 605342; MGI: 2450532; GeneCards: PILRB
Available structures
PDB	Ortholog search: PDBe RCSB
PDB	List of PDB id codes 4NFC, 4NFD

Gene location (Human)
Chr.	Chromosome 7 (human)
Band	7q22.1	Start	100,352,176 bp
Band	7q22.1	End	100,367,831 bp

Gene location (Mouse)
Chr.	Chromosome 5 (mouse)
Band	5|5 G2	Start	137,850,409 bp
Band	5|5 G2	End	137,856,368 bp
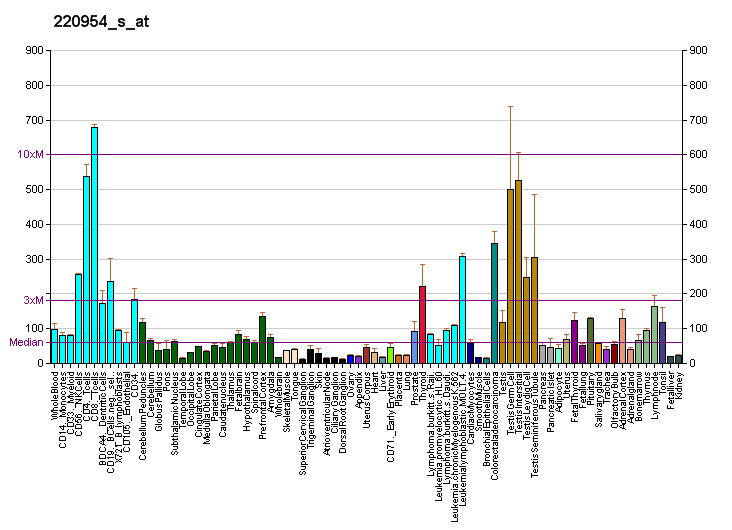
RNA expression pattern
Bgee	Human / Mouse (ortholog); Top expressed in: right testis; left testis; right uterine tube; pituitary gland; right hemisphere of cerebellum; anterior pituitary; right lobe of thyroid gland; left lobe of thyroid gland; granulocyte; spleen / Top expressed in: granulocyte; spleen; bone marrow; embryo; jejunum; embryo; liver; ileum; colon; duodenum; More reference expression data
BioGPS	More reference expression data
Gene ontology
Molecular function	MHC class I protein binding; protein binding
Cellular component	integral component of membrane; membrane; integral component of plasma membrane; plasma membrane
Biological process	activation of transmembrane receptor protein tyrosine kinase activity; transmembrane receptor protein tyrosine kinase signaling pathway; regulation of immune response
Sources:Amigo / QuickGO
Orthologs
Databases	NCBI: entry; OMA: entry
Species	Human	Mouse
Entrez	29990	170741
Ensembl	ENSG00000121716	ENSMUSG00000066684
UniProt	Q9UKJ0	Q2YFS2
RefSeq (mRNA)	NM_178238; NM_013440; NM_175047; NM_001371931	NM_133209
RefSeq (protein)	NP_839956; NP_001358860	NP_573472
Location (UCSC)	Chr 7: 100.35 – 100.37 Mb	Chr 5: 137.85 – 137.86 Mb
PubMed search
- Wikidata
View/Edit Human	View/Edit Mouse

Paired immunoglobulin-like type 2 receptor beta is a protein that in humans is encoded by the PILRB gene.

== Function ==
Cell signaling pathways rely on a dynamic interaction between activating and inhibiting processes. SHP-1-mediated dephosphorylation of protein tyrosine residues is central to the regulation of several cell signaling pathways. Two types of inhibitory receptor superfamily members are immunoreceptor tyrosine-based inhibitory motif (ITIM)-bearing receptors and their non-ITIM-bearing, activating counterparts.

Control of cell signaling via SHP-1 is thought to occur through a balance between PILRalpha-mediated inhibition and PILRbeta-mediated activation. These paired immunoglobulin-like receptor genes are located in a tandem head-to-tail orientation on chromosome 7. This particular gene encodes the non-ITIM-bearing member of the receptor pair, which has a truncated cytoplasmic tail relative to its ITIM-bearing partner and functions in the activating role. Alternative splicing has been observed at this locus and three variants, encoding two distinct isoforms, are described. Additional transcript variants have been identified but their full-length nature has not been determined.

The mouse homolog of PILRbeta has been studied in mice and found to have one known natural ligand, CD99, though it is unclear if this interaction occurs in the human homologs.

== Structure ==
As with other paired receptors, PILRbeta has a truncated cytoplasmic tail compared to PILRalpha and features a charged residue within its transmembrane domain. PILRbeta has an extracellular domain with a siglec-like immunoglobulin fold that substitutes hydrophobic interactions for the siglec fold's characteristic disulfide bond. The structure of this domain is very similar to that of PILRalpha, but the two proteins nevertheless have different binding affinities for sialic acid.
