= FCGR2B =

Antibody fragment receptor in humoral immunity

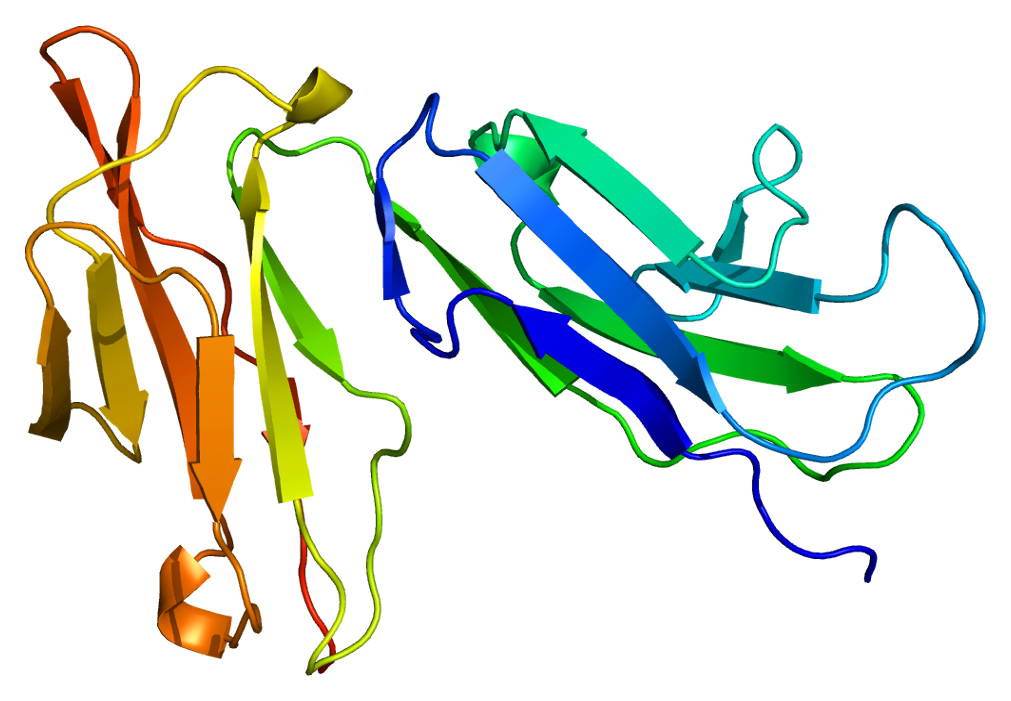

Identifiers
- Aliases: FCGR2B, CD32, CD32B, FCG2, FCGR2, IGFR2, Fc fragment of IgG receptor IIb, FcRII-c, FCGR2C
- External IDs: OMIM: 604590; MGI: 95499; GeneCards: FCGR2B
Available structures
PDB	Ortholog search: PDBe RCSB
PDB	List of PDB id codes 2FCB, 3WJJ,%%s3WJL

Gene location (Human)
Chr.	Chromosome 1 (human)
Band	1q23.3	Start	161,663,147 bp
Band	1q23.3	End	161,678,654 bp

Gene location (Mouse)
Chr.	Chromosome 1 (mouse)
Band	1 H3|1 78.02 cM	Start	170,786,186 bp
Band	1 H3|1 78.02 cM	End	170,804,116 bp
RNA expression pattern
Bgee	Human / Mouse (ortholog); Top expressed in: placenta; right coronary artery; blood; spleen; monocyte; lymph node; synovial membrane; synovial joint; granulocyte; appendix / Top expressed in: stroma of bone marrow; tibiofemoral joint; calvaria; granulocyte; skin of abdomen; blood; spleen; right kidney; molar; motor neuron; More reference expression data
BioGPS	n/a
Gene ontology
Molecular function	protein binding; IgG binding; amyloid-beta binding; low-affinity IgG receptor activity; protein-containing complex binding; transmembrane signaling receptor activity
Cellular component	integral component of membrane; plasma membrane; membrane; integral component of plasma membrane; external side of plasma membrane; dendritic spine; cell body; cytoplasm
Biological process	viral process; immune response; signal transduction; regulation of immune response; negative regulation of type I hypersensitivity; negative regulation of antibody-dependent cellular cytotoxicity; follicular dendritic cell activation; mature B cell differentiation involved in immune response; follicular B cell differentiation; immune complex clearance by monocytes and macrophages; negative regulation of dendritic cell antigen processing and presentation; regulation of B cell antigen processing and presentation; negative regulation of immunoglobulin production; regulation of adaptive immune response; negative regulation of acute inflammatory response to antigenic stimulus; positive regulation of humoral immune response; negative regulation of humoral immune response mediated by circulating immunoglobulin; receptor-mediated endocytosis; phagocytosis, engulfment; defense response; inflammatory response; response to bacterium; regulation of signaling receptor activity; immunoglobulin mediated immune response; antigen processing and presentation of exogenous peptide antigen via MHC class II; cerebellum development; negative regulation of B cell proliferation; negative regulation of interleukin-10 production; Fc-gamma receptor signaling pathway involved in phagocytosis; negative regulation of macrophage activation; negative regulation of cytotoxic T cell degranulation; regulation of innate immune response; mast cell activation; positive regulation of JNK cascade; negative regulation of phagocytosis; positive regulation of phagocytosis; negative regulation of immune response; negative regulation of B cell receptor signaling pathway; negative regulation of B cell activation; cellular response to molecule of bacterial origin; regulation of immune complex clearance by monocytes and macrophages; positive regulation of neuron death; negative regulation of neutrophil activation; regulation of dendritic spine maintenance; cellular response to amyloid-beta; positive regulation of response to endoplasmic reticulum stress; negative regulation of dendritic cell differentiation
Sources:Amigo / QuickGO
Orthologs
Databases	NCBI: entry; OMA: entry
Species	Human	Mouse
Entrez	2213	14130
Ensembl	ENSG00000072694	ENSMUSG00000026656
UniProt	P31994; P31995	P08101
RefSeq (mRNA)	NM_001002273; NM_001002274; NM_001002275; NM_001190828; NM_004001	NM_001077189; NM_010187
RefSeq (protein)	NP_001002273; NP_001002274; NP_001002275; NP_001177757; NP_003992 NP_963857	NP_001070657; NP_034317
Location (UCSC)	Chr 1: 161.66 – 161.68 Mb	Chr 1: 170.79 – 170.8 Mb
PubMed search
- Wikidata
View/Edit Human	View/Edit Mouse

Fc fragment of IgG receptor IIb (coded by FCGR2B gene) is a low affinity inhibitory receptor for the Fc region of immunoglobulin gamma (IgG). FCGR2B participates in the phagocytosis of immune complexes and in the regulation of antibody production by B lymphocytes.

== Structure ==
There are two major forms of FCGR2B existing (FCGR2B1 and FCGR2B2) and they are created by mRNA splicing mechanism, which results in the inclusion (FCGR2B1) or exclusion (FCGR2B2) of the C1 exon sequence. The presence of the C1 exon sequence (in FCGR2B1) results in tethering to the membrane of B cells, whereas its absence (in FCGR2B2) allows fast internalization of the receptor in myeloid cells. Both forms contain the Immunoreceptor Tyrosine-based Inhibitory Motif (ITIM) in their cytoplasmic regions. The extracellular domains are 95% identical to the domains of FCGR2A and almost completely identical to the FCGR2C (the other members of CD32 family). It is the only inhibitory type I FcγR in humans and mice.

=== Expression ===
FCGR2B1 is highly expressed by B cells, and its mRNA has also been identified at lower levels on monocytes. FCGR2B2 is highly expressed on basophils and at low levels on monocytes. FCGR2B is co-expressed with the activating FCGRA on circulating myeloid dendritic cells in peripheral blood. Cytokine regulation of the expression is positive in the case of IL-10 and IL-6 and negative in the case of TNF-α, C5a and IFN-γ.

FCGR2B is co-expressed with the activating FCGRA on circulating myeloid dendritic cells.

== Function ==
The receptor inhibits the functions of activating FcγRs, such as phagocytosis and pro-inflammatory cytokine release, mainly by clustering of FCGR2B with different activating FCGR receptors or with the BCR by immune complexes.

The phosphorylated ITIM of FcγRIIB recruits the inositol phosphatases SHIP1 and SHIP2, which inhibit Ras activation, downregulate MAPK activity and reduce PLCγ function and lead to decreased activation of PKC. Inhibition of the MAP kinase pathway, together with the anti-apoptotic kinase Akt can negatively affect proliferation and survival of the cells. However, FcγRIIB can restrict activation of cells bearing FcγRs by simply competing with them for engagement with immune complexes, as removal of the ITIM retains this activity.

FCGR2B regulates B cell activation by increasing the BCR activation threshold and suppressing B cell-mediated antigen presentation to T cells through the ITIM-dependent inhibitory mechanism. Ligation of FCGR2B on B cells downregulates antibody production, prevents the membrane organization of BCR and CD19 and promotes apoptosis. Co-ligation of FCGR2B on dendritic cells inhibits maturation and blocks cell activation. The negative regulatory role of the FCGRIIB molecule is not limited to BCR-induced B-cell activation, but is also functional on other B-cell activation pathways mediated by CD40 and IL-4. BCR signaling attenuates the pro-apoptotic signaling induced by aggregation of FcγRIIB through immune complexes, allowing for FcγRIIB to effectively tune the affinity threshold for antigen in immune responses and selectively promote retention and survival of high-affinity B cells.

The transmembrane region of FcγRIIB also appears to be functionally important. Multiple epidemiological studies link polymorphisms in the transmembrane domain of FcγRIIB to autoimmune diseases including systemic lupus erythematosus and rheumatoid arthritis. Mutagenesis studies confirm that lesioning the transmembrane region impairs the ability of FcγRIIB to attenuate B cell signaling. Multiple mechanisms are proposed to account for this, relating to the ability of FcγRIIB to co-localize with the BCR, colocalize with activating FcγRs (in non-B cells), prevent its colocalization with the activating receptor CD19.

FCGR2B expression on follicular dendritic cells (FDCs) is important for capturing the antigen-containing immune complexes which are essential for the germinal centre response. It has been shown that in the absence of FcγRIIB on FDCs, the germinal centers are more diverse but populated by low affinity B cells with low levels of somatic hypermutation. The mechanisms underlying this are incompletely understood, but it is noted that the ability of FDCs to retain immune complexes in the absence of FcγRIIB is impaired and this may result in lower stringency in selection for entry into the germinal center reaction.

FCGR2B is present on non-leukocyte cells including airway smooth muscle and liver sinusoidal endothelial cells, where small immune complexes are internalized inhibiting the pro-inflammatory signalling.

== Autoimmunity ==
FCGR2B is one of the genes thought to influence susceptibility to several autoimmune diseases in humans. Its decreased function is associated with systemic lupus erythematosus, rheumatoid arthritis, Goodpasture's disease, multiple sclerosis and others.

FCGR2B may be a target for monoclonal antibody therapy for autoimmune diseases as well as malignancies.

== See also ==
- CD32
