= SIGLEC10 =

Protein-coding gene in the species Homo sapiens

Identifiers
- Aliases: SIGLEC10, PRO940, SIGLEC-10, SLG2, sialic acid binding Ig like lectin 10
- External IDs: OMIM: 606091; MGI: 2443630; GeneCards: SIGLEC10

Gene location (Human)
Chr.	Chromosome 19 (human)
Band	19q13.41	Start	51,410,020 bp
Band	19q13.41	End	51,417,803 bp

Gene location (Mouse)
Chr.	Chromosome 7 (mouse)
Band	7|7 B3	Start	43,057,628 bp
Band	7|7 B3	End	43,067,782 bp
RNA expression pattern
Bgee	Human / Mouse (ortholog); Top expressed in: granulocyte; monocyte; blood; appendix; spleen; oocyte; secondary oocyte; lymph node; buccal mucosa cell; right adrenal cortex / Top expressed in: mesenteric lymph nodes; spleen; granulocyte; blood; subcutaneous adipose tissue; bone marrow; pharynx; morula; submandibular gland; blastocyst; More reference expression data
BioGPS	n/a
Gene ontology
Molecular function	carbohydrate binding; protein binding; phosphatase binding; SH2 domain binding
Cellular component	integral component of membrane; extracellular region; membrane; plasma membrane
Biological process	cell adhesion; adaptive immune response; immune system process; innate immune response; negative regulation of inflammatory response to wounding
Sources:Amigo / QuickGO
Orthologs
Databases	NCBI: entry; OMA: entry
Species	Human	Mouse
Entrez	89790	243958
Ensembl	ENSG00000142512	ENSMUSG00000030468
UniProt	Q96LC7	Q80ZE3
RefSeq (mRNA)	NM_001171156; NM_001171157; NM_001171158; NM_001171159; NM_001171160 NM_001171161; NM_033130; NM_001322105	NM_172900; NM_001382486
RefSeq (protein)	NP_001164627; NP_001164628; NP_001164629; NP_001164630; NP_001164632 NP_001309034; NP_149121	NP_766488; NP_001369415
Location (UCSC)	Chr 19: 51.41 – 51.42 Mb	Chr 7: 43.06 – 43.07 Mb
PubMed search
- Wikidata
View/Edit Human	View/Edit Mouse

Sialic acid-binding Ig-like lectin 10 is a protein that in humans is encoded by the SIGLEC10 gene. Siglec-G is often referred to as the murine paralog of human Siglec-10

== Structure and function ==
Like most but not all other Siglecs, Siglec-10 bears an ITIM (Immunoreceptor tyrosine-based inhibitory motif) within its cytoplasmic domain. Siglec-10 is a ligand for CD52, the target of the therapeutic monoclonal antibody Alemtuzumab. It is also reported to bind to Vascular adhesion protein 1 (VAP-1) and to the co-stimulatory molecule CD24 also known as HSA (Heat-stable antigen).

== Gene family summary ==
SIGLECs are members of the immunoglobulin superfamily that are expressed on the cell surface. Most SIGLECs have 1 or more cytoplasmic immune receptor tyrosine-based inhibitory motifs, or ITIMs. SIGLECs are typically expressed on cells of the innate immune system, with the exception of the B-cell expressed SIGLEC6 (MIM 604405).[supplied by OMIM]
