= CD32 =

Surface receptor glycoprotein

Fc fragment of IgG, low affinity IIa, receptor (CD32)

Identifiers
- Symbol: FCGR2A
- Alt. symbols: FCG2, FCGR2A1, FCGR2
- NCBI gene: 2212
- HGNC: 3616
- OMIM: 146790
- RefSeq: NM_021642
- UniProt: P12318

Other data
- Locus: Chr. 1 q23
Search for
- Structures: Swiss-model
- Domains: InterPro

Fc fragment of IgG, low affinity IIb, receptor (CD32)
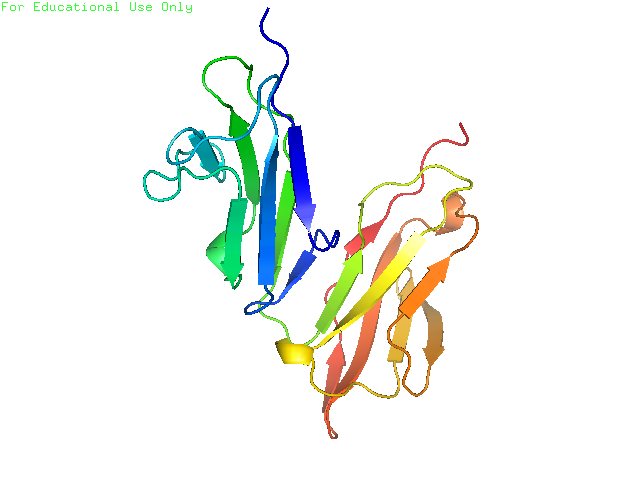
- Crystal structure of the human fcgamma-receptor IIb ectodomain (CD32).

Identifiers
- Symbol: FCGR2B
- Alt. symbols: FCG2, FCGR2
- NCBI gene: 2213
- HGNC: 3618
- OMIM: 604590
- RefSeq: NM_004001
- UniProt: P31994

Other data
- Locus: Chr. 1 q23
Search for
- Structures: Swiss-model
- Domains: InterPro

Fc fragment of IgG, low affinity IIc, receptor for (CD32)

Identifiers
- Symbol: FCGR2C
- NCBI gene: 9103
- HGNC: 15626
- RefSeq: NM_201563
- UniProt: P31995

Other data
- Locus: Chr. 1 q23
Search for
- Structures: Swiss-model
- Domains: InterPro

CD32 (cluster of differentiation 32), also known as FcγRII or FCGR2, is a surface receptor glycoprotein belonging to the Ig gene superfamily. CD32 can be found on the surface of a variety of immune cells. CD32 has a low-affinity for the Fc region of IgG antibodies in monomeric form, but high affinity for IgG immune complexes. CD32 has two major functions: cellular response regulation, and the uptake of immune complexes. Cellular responses regulated by CD32 include phagocytosis, cytokine stimulation, and endocytic transport. Dysregulated CD32 is associated with different forms of autoimmunity, including systemic lupus erythematosus. In humans, there are three major CD32 subtypes: CD32A, CD32B, and CD32C. While CD32A and CD32C are involved in activating cellular responses, CD32B is inhibitory.

== Structure and signaling ==
CD32 is a type I transmembrane protein with a helical transmembrane region. Whereas the extracellular region consists of three immunoglobulin domains (roughly 100 a.a. in length), the cytosolic region varies by subtype. CD32A and CD32C possess an immunoreceptor tyrosine-based activation motif (ITAM), while CD32B has an immunoreceptor tyrosine-based inhibitory motif (ITIM). Both motif types rely upon interactions with SH2 domain-containing proteins to transduce signals upon binding to an IgG immune complex. When an ITIM is phosphorylated, it activates effector proteins that dephosphorylate the downstream targets of the ITAM signal cascade, such as MAP kinases.

CD32 receptors bind to the lower hinge region of IgG via an extracellular domain. Additionally, all CD32 subtypes readily bind IgG1 and IgG3 immune complexes, but differ in their binding affinities for IgG2 and IgG4. CD32A binds IgG2 immune complexes, but not IgG4. CD32B and CD32C bind IgG4 immune complexes, but not IgG2. The usage of monoclonal antibodies can distinguish between CD32A and CD32B; however, the high degree of homology between the extracellular domains of CD32A and CD32C make differentiation difficult.

== Functions and locations ==
=== CD32A ===
CD32A is an activating subtype of CD32 that can be found on a variety of immune cells - notably, CD32A is found on platelets, neutrophils, macrophages, and dendritic cells (DCs). On platelets, it is known to aid in the internalization of IgG-opsonized Escherichia coli, and it is more generally implicated in mediating bacterial-activated platelet responses. CD32A also plays an important role in platelet activation, adhesion, and aggregation in response to injured blood vessels. When bound to an IgG immune complex, the cytosolic ITAM can promote phagocytic activity and cytokine secretion in neutrophils and macrophages. CD32A is known to aid in the activation of clathrin coat-mediated endocytosis on various cell types. On DCs, CD32A plays an important role in maturation and the upregulation of costimulatory molecules on the cell surface, strengthening the DC's ability to present antigen to T cells. CD32A activation is necessary and sufficient to produce T cell anti-tumor cellular immunity. CD32A is also linked to autoimmunity; for example, the production of antibodies against platelet factor 4 (PF4) bound to CD32A is linked to the development of heparin-induced thrombocytopenia.

CD32A is also found on Langerhans cells, mast cells, basophils, eosinophils, monocytes, megakaryocytes, and a subpopulation of activated CD4+ T cells. CD32A is unique to primates.

=== CD32B ===
CD32B is an inhibitory surface receptor that is part of a large population of B cell co-receptors, which act to modulate signaling. Activated CD32B has the ability to cross-link with B cell receptors (BCRs), which increases the threshold for B cell activation and downregulates antibody production in the presence of IgG. This feedback loop lowers the production of IgG by B cells when there is a surplus of IgG in the body. CD32B is also found on the surface of follicular dendritic cells (FDCs), which utilize CD32B for the retention and recycling of immune complexes that they later present to B cells. Thus, CD32B plays an important role in both antibody and memory immune responses.

The balance between CD32B and its activating counterparts is crucial to appropriate cell function. Having too little CD32B has been associated with dysregulated antibody function, as well as increased antibody-dependent inflammatory cell responses. Some individuals inheriting mutated, inactivate CD32B genes have a reduced risk of contracting malaria; this is attributed to an enhancement of FcR-dependent phagocytic functions. CD32B imbalance is also associated with autoimmunity. CD32B-deficient mice have been found to be more susceptible to immune-complex-mediated autoimmunity. Likewise, systemic lupus erythematosus (SLE) in humans is associated with a decrease in CD32B on the surface of memory B cells. A decrease on dendritic cells is often found in patients with rheumatoid arthritis. The therapeutic usage of monoclonal antibodies against CD32B can be effective for inducing cytotoxicity against B cell lymphoma cells.

CD32B is also found on basophils, neutrophils, monocytes, and macrophages.

==== Non-immune system locations ====
CD32B can be found on airway smooth muscle cells, as well as liver sinusoidal endothelial cells and salivary gland epithelial cells.

=== CD32C ===
CD32C is expressed in ~20% of the human population, and is not well-understood. It can be found on B cells and natural killer (NK) cells. When expressed, CD32C plays an important role in the activation of antibody-dependent cell cytotoxicity (ADCC). Animal studies have linked CD32C to augmentation of pathological inflammatory responses.

== See also ==
- FCGR2A
- FCGR2B
- FCGR2C
- Fc-gamma receptors
