= PILRA =

Protein-coding gene in the species Homo sapiens

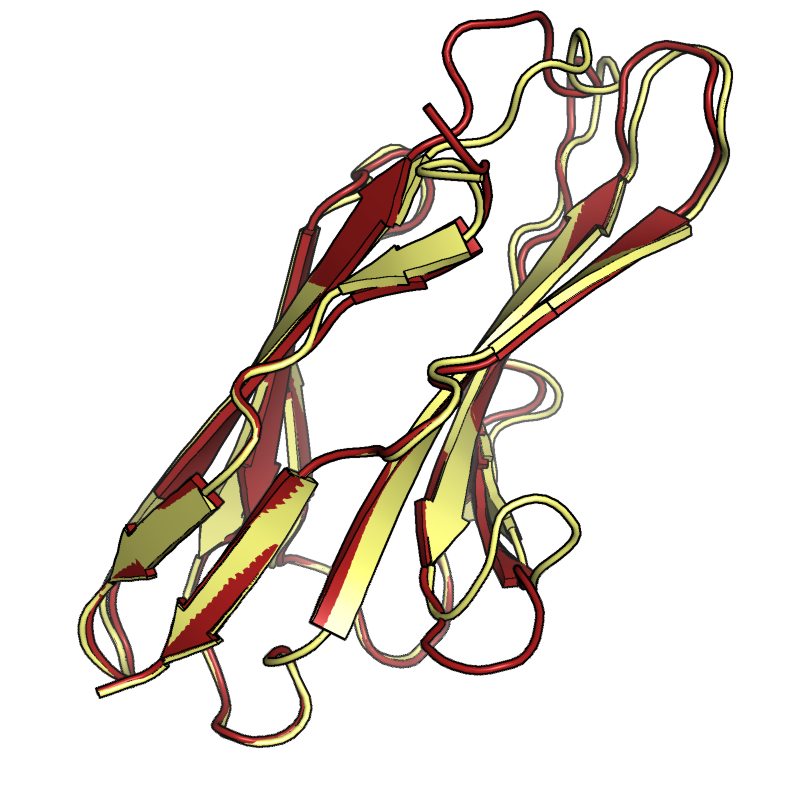

Identifiers
- Aliases: PILRA, FDF03, paired immunoglobin like type 2 receptor alpha
- External IDs: OMIM: 605341; MGI: 2450529; GeneCards: PILRA
Available structures
PDB	Ortholog search: PDBe RCSB
PDB	List of PDB id codes 3WUZ, 3WV0, 4NFB

Gene location (Human)
Chr.	Chromosome 7 (human)
Band	7q22.1	Start	100,367,530 bp
Band	7q22.1	End	100,400,096 bp

Gene location (Mouse)
Chr.	Chromosome 5 (mouse)
Band	5|5 G2	Start	137,820,214 bp
Band	5|5 G2	End	137,834,543 bp
RNA expression pattern
Bgee	Human / Mouse (ortholog); Top expressed in: monocyte; granulocyte; blood; cerebellar hemisphere; right hemisphere of cerebellum; spleen; bone marrow; right lung; bone marrow cell; appendix / Top expressed in: granulocyte; blood; spleen; urethra; bone marrow; tibiofemoral joint; right lung lobe; liver; embryo; jejunum; More reference expression data
BioGPS	n/a
Gene ontology
Molecular function	MHC class I protein binding; protein binding
Cellular component	integral component of membrane; extracellular region; extracellular exosome; membrane; plasma membrane
Biological process	viral process; signal transduction; transmembrane receptor protein tyrosine kinase signaling pathway; regulation of immune response
Sources:Amigo / QuickGO
Orthologs
Databases	NCBI: entry; OMA: entry
Species	Human	Mouse
Entrez	29992	231805
Ensembl	ENSG00000085514	ENSMUSG00000046245
UniProt	Q9UKJ1	Q2YFS3
RefSeq (mRNA)	NM_178273; NM_013439; NM_178272	NM_153510
RefSeq (protein)	NP_038467; NP_840056; NP_840057	NP_705730
Location (UCSC)	Chr 7: 100.37 – 100.4 Mb	Chr 5: 137.82 – 137.83 Mb
PubMed search
- Wikidata
View/Edit Human	View/Edit Mouse

Paired immunoglobin like type 2 receptor alpha is a protein that in humans is encoded by the PILRA gene.

== Function ==
Cell signaling pathways rely on a dynamic interaction between activating and inhibiting processes. SHP-1-mediated dephosphorylation of protein tyrosine residues is central to the regulation of several cell signaling pathways. Two types of inhibitory receptor superfamily members are immunoreceptor tyrosine-based inhibitory motif (ITIM)-bearing receptors and their non-ITIM-bearing, activating counterparts.

Control of cell signaling via SHP-1 is thought to occur through a balance between PILRalpha-mediated inhibition and PILRbeta-mediated activation. These paired immunoglobulin-like receptor genes are located in a tandem head-to-tail orientation on chromosome 7. This particular gene encodes the ITIM-bearing member of the receptor pair, which functions in the inhibitory role. Alternative splicing has been observed at this locus, and three variants, each encoding a distinct isoform, are described.

In contrast to PILRbeta, which has only one known natural ligand, PILRalpha has many known protein-protein interactions. PILRalpha recruits PTPN6 and PTPN1 via interactions of its ITIM motifs. PILRalpha is also used by some viruses, notably HSV-1, for cell entry.

== Structure ==
As with other paired receptors, PILRalpha has a longer cytoplasmic tail compared to PILRbeta and features two intracellular ITIM motifs. PILRalpha has an extracellular domain with a siglec-like immunoglobulin fold that substitutes hydrophobic interactions for the siglec fold's characteristic disulfide bond. The structure of this domain is very similar to that of PILRbeta, but the two proteins nevertheless have different binding affinities for sialic acid.
