= Silvia Bolland =

American biomedical scientist

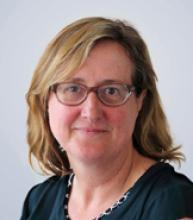
- Scientific career
- Fields: Biomedicine
- Institutions: National Institute of Allergy and Infectious Diseases

Silvia Bolland is an American biomedical scientist serving as chief of the autoimmunity and functional genomics section at the National Institute of Allergy and Infectious Diseases.

She earned a Ph.D. in molecular biology from the University of Cantabria and received postdoctoral training at Harvard and Rockefeller University. Her areas of research include the identification of new genetic modifiers of systemic autoimmune disease, dose effect of Toll-like receptor genes and its role in autoimmune pathologies, and inhibitory signaling pathways mediated by the IgG Fc receptor (Fc gamma RIIB) and the phosphoinositol 5-phosphatase (SHIP).

== Selected works ==
- Ono, Masao; Bolland, Silvia; Tempst, Paul; Ravetch, Jeffrey V. (September 1996). "Role of the inositol phosphatase SHIP in negative regulation of the immune system by the receptor FeγRIIB". Nature. 383 (6597): 263–266. Bibcode:1996Natur.383..263O. doi:10.1038/383263a0. ISSN 1476-4687. PMID 8805703. S2CID 4339496.
- Bolland, Silvia; Ravetch, Jeffrey V (August 2000). "Spontaneous Autoimmune Disease in FcγRIIB-Deficient Mice Results from Strain-Specific Epistasis". Immunity. 13 (2): 277–285. doi:10.1016/S1074-7613(00)00027-3. PMID 10981970.
- Ravetch, Jeffrey V.; Bolland, Silvia (April 2001). "IgG Fc Receptors". Annual Review of Immunology. 19 (1): 275–290. doi:10.1146/annurev.immunol.19.1.275. ISSN 0732-0582. PMID 11244038.
