= CD52 =

Protein-coding gene found in humans

Identifiers
- Aliases: CD52, CDW52, CD52 molecule, EDDM5, HE5
- External IDs: OMIM: 114280; GeneCards: CD52

Gene location (Human)
Chr.	Chromosome 1 (human)
Band	1p36.11	Start	26,317,958 bp
Band	1p36.11	End	26,320,523 bp
RNA expression pattern
Bgee	Human / Mouse (ortholog); Top expressed in: corpus epididymis; tail of epididymis; granulocyte; monocyte; spleen; thymus; right lung; lymph node; appendix; blood / n/a; More reference expression data
BioGPS	n/a
Orthologs
Databases	NCBI: entry; OMA: entry
Species	Human	Mouse
Entrez	1043	n/a
Ensembl	ENSG00000169442	n/a
UniProt	P31358	n/a
RefSeq (mRNA)	NM_001803	n/a
RefSeq (protein)	NP_001794	n/a
Location (UCSC)	Chr 1: 26.32 – 26.32 Mb	n/a
PubMed search		n/a
- Wikidata
View/Edit Human

CAMPATH-1 antigen, also known as cluster of differentiation 52 (CD52), is a glycoprotein that in humans is encoded by the CD52 gene.

CD52 is present on the surface of mature lymphocytes, but not on the stem cells from which these lymphocytes were derived. It also is found on monocytes and dendritic cells. Further, it is found within the male genital tract and is present on the surface of mature sperm cells.

CD52 is a peptide of 12 amino acids, anchored to glycosylphosphatidylinositol (GPI). Since it is highly negatively charged and present on sperm cells and lymphocytes, it has been conjectured that its function is anti-adhesion, allowing cells to freely move around.

CD52 binds the ITIM (immunoreceptor tyrosine-based inhibitory motif)-bearing sialic acid-binding lectin SIGLEC10.

== Clinical significance ==
It is associated with certain types of lymphoma.

It is the protein targeted by alemtuzumab, a monoclonal antibody used for the treatment of chronic lymphocytic leukemia and organ transplantation. A phase III trial into treatment of relapsing-remitting multiple sclerosis showed a reduction in relapse rate, but no statistically significant reduction in accumulated disability, when used as a first-line therapy. However, a sister study looking at patients in whom relapses had occurred despite treatment with interferon beta or glatiramer demonstrated reduction in both relapse rate and accumulated disability. 20% patients randomised to interferon beta 1a had "sustained accumulation of disability" compared with 13% in the alemtuzumab group.
