= Hybrid resistance =

Hybrid resistance is a case of hybrid resistance, where the parental bone marrow (BM) graft is rejected by F1 generation in murine model first described by Cudkowic in 1963. . This rejection is caused by natural killer (NK) cells of the recipient. The model which describes this event is called "The missing self".

== The Mechanism ==
The rejection of parental (P) BM graft by F1 generation is caused by NK cells as was said. The activity of these cells (NK cells) is inhibited, if there is cell signaling through inhibitory receptors (Ly49 - mouse, KIR- human). These receptors recognized MHC I molecules on other cells and interact with them. If the inhibition is strong, it means there is signaling Ly49/KIR - MHC I, the inhibition of NK cell occurs. However, if there is no specific self MHC I (H2 alele in murine model) the inhibition of inhibition comes to pass. It means activation of NK cell.

In a case of BM transplantation, where the F1 generation arise from two individuals with H2^{b/b} and H2^{k/k} MHC I phenotype. The F1 generation will be H2^{b/k}. It means that there are NK cells in F1 generation, that recognize H2^{b/k} alleles as a self MHC I and there has to be signaling through both of them to inhibition of NKs. But from the P can be only H2^{b/b} or H2^{k/k} transplanted, so the NKs won't be inhibited enough, because they need signals from both MHC I alleles. This event leads to parental graft rejection.
