= Sialic acid–binding Ig-like lectin 12 =

Protein-coding gene in the species Homo sapiens

SIGLEC12

Identifiers
- Aliases: SIGLEC12, S2V, SIGLECL1, SLG, Siglec-XII, sialic acid binding Ig like lectin 12 (gene/pseudogene), sialic acid binding Ig like lectin 12
- External IDs: OMIM: 606094; GeneCards: SIGLEC12

Gene location (Human)
Chr.	Chromosome 19 (human)
Band	19q13.41	Start	51,491,227 bp
Band	19q13.41	End	51,501,800 bp
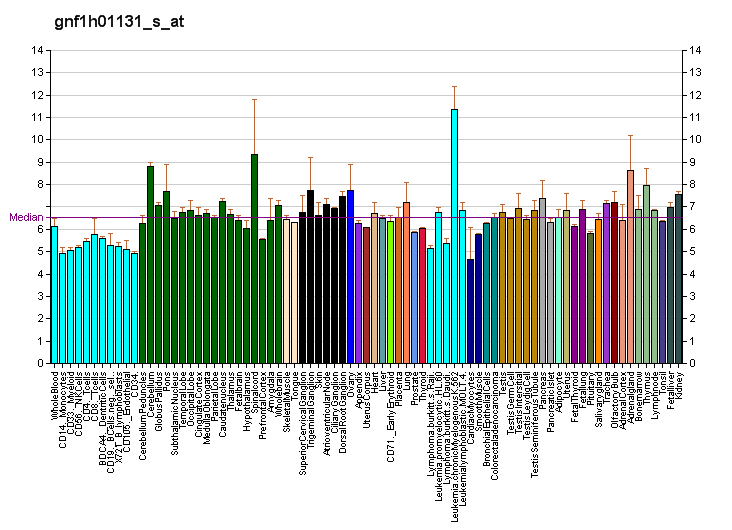
RNA expression pattern
Bgee	Human / Mouse (ortholog); Top expressed in: spleen; testicle; duodenum; granulocyte; appendix; lymph node; right lung; rectum; monocyte; blood / n/a; More reference expression data
BioGPS	More reference expression data
Gene ontology
Molecular function	carbohydrate binding
Cellular component	membrane; integral component of membrane
Biological process	cell adhesion
Sources:Amigo / QuickGO
Orthologs
Databases	NCBI: entry; OMA: entry
Species	Human	Mouse
Entrez	89858	n/a
Ensembl	ENSG00000254521	n/a
UniProt	Q96PQ1	n/a
RefSeq (mRNA)	NM_033329; NM_053003	n/a
RefSeq (protein)	NP_201586; NP_443729	n/a
Location (UCSC)	Chr 19: 51.49 – 51.5 Mb	n/a
PubMed search		n/a
- Wikidata
View/Edit Human

Sialic acid-binding Ig-like lectin 12, or Siglec-XII, is a protein that in humans, is encoded by the SIGLEC12 gene.

Sialic acid-binding immunoglobulin-like lectins (SIGLECs) are a family of cell surface proteins belonging to the immunoglobulin superfamily. They mediate protein-carbohydrate interactions by selectively binding to different sialic acid moieties present on glycolipids and glycoproteins. This gene encodes a member of the SIGLEC3-like subfamily of SIGLECs. Members of this subfamily are characterized by an extracellular V-set immunoglobulin-like domain followed by two C2-set immunoglobulin-like domains, and the cytoplasmic tyrosine-based motifs, ITIM and SLAM-like.

The encoded protein, upon tyrosine phosphorylation, has been shown to recruit the Src homology 2 domain-containing protein-tyrosine phosphatases SHP1 and SHP2. It has been suggested that the protein is involved in the negative regulation of macrophage signaling by functioning as an inhibitory receptor. This gene is located in a cluster with other SIGLEC3-like genes on 19q13.4.

Alternatively spliced transcript variants encoding distinct isoforms have been described for this gene.

The Siglec-XII protein has been identified as a possible promoter of human carcinoma progression in research by Ajit Varki and Nissi Varki at the University of California San Diego School of Medicine. Approximately seventy percent of humans have a mutation that inactivates the protein, but those without the mutation may suffer an inordinate number of carcinomas when compared to other primates. The research is being conducted to determine whether inactivation of the gene might deter its promotional effect upon the progression of human carcinoma.
