= SIGLEC5 =

Protein-coding gene in the species Homo sapiens

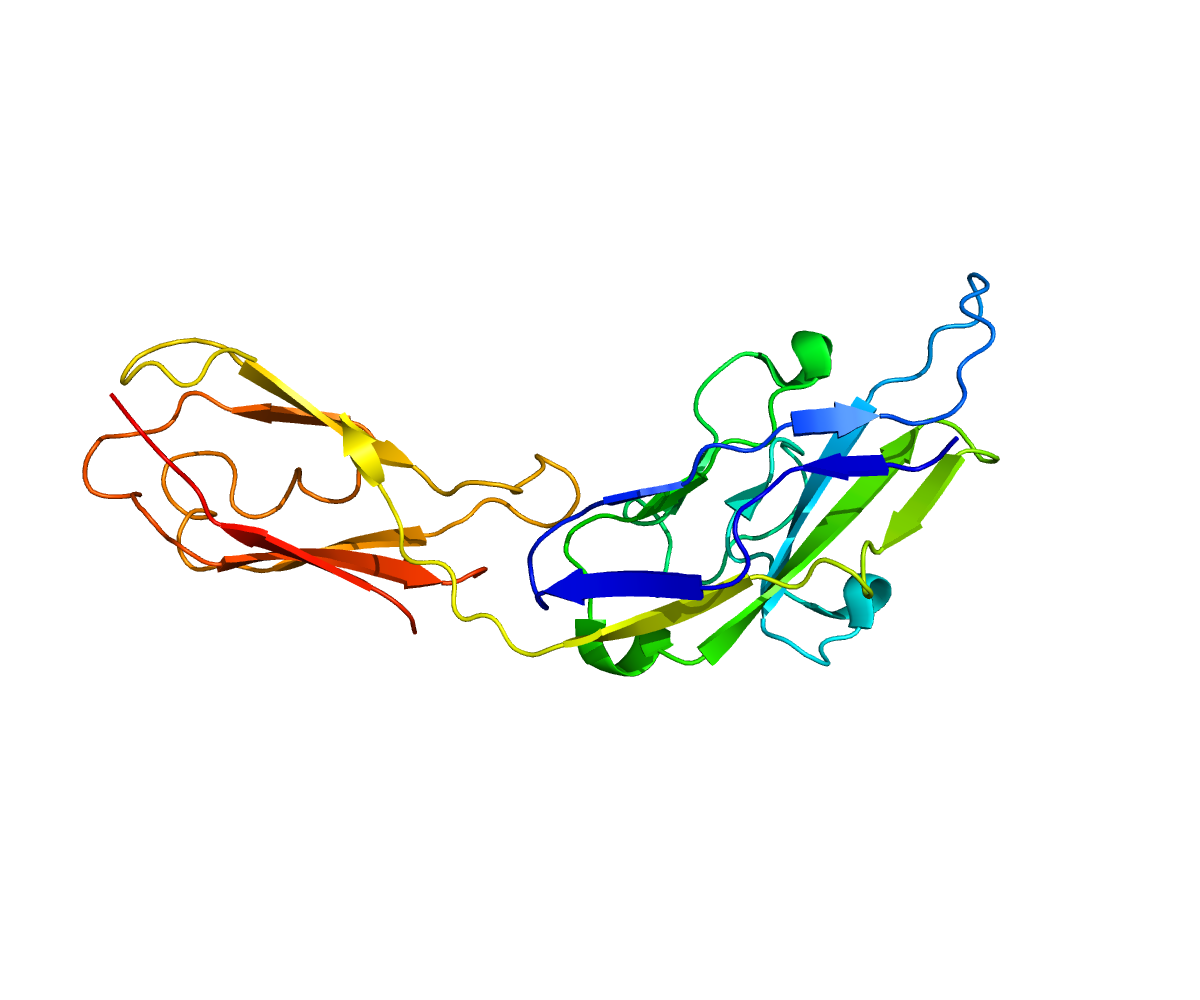

Identifiers
- Aliases: SIGLEC5, CD170, CD33L2, OB-BP2, OBBP2, SIGLEC-5, sialic acid binding Ig like lectin 5
- External IDs: OMIM: 604200; GeneCards: SIGLEC5
Available structures
| PDB | Human UniProt search: PDBe RCSB |
| PDB | List of PDB id codes 2ZG1, 2ZG2, 2ZG3 |

Gene location (Human)
| Chr. | Chromosome 19 (human) |
| Band | 19q13.41 | Start | 51,610,960 bp |
| Band | 19q13.41 | End | 51,630,401 bp |
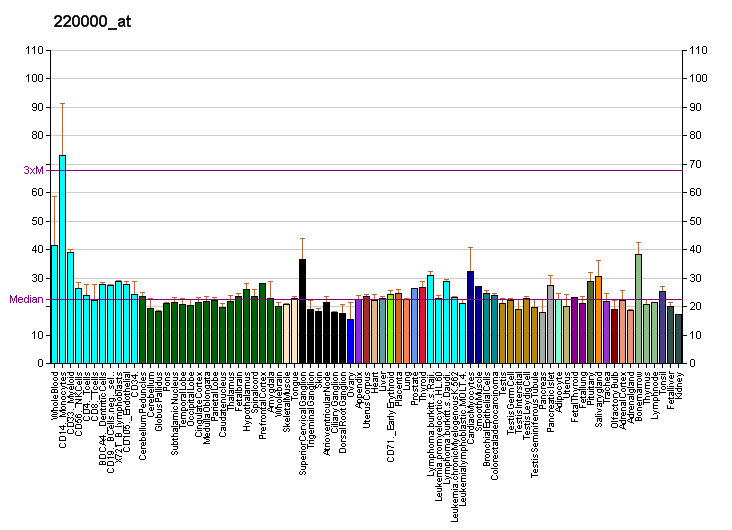
RNA expression pattern
| Bgee | Human / Mouse (ortholog); Top expressed in: blood; bone marrow; bone marrow cell; granulocyte; monocyte; appendix; lymph node; right lung; spleen; duodenum / n/a; More reference expression data |
| BioGPS | More reference expression data |
Gene ontology
| Molecular function | carbohydrate binding; protein binding |
| Cellular component | integral component of membrane; membrane; plasma membrane; secretory granule membrane; tertiary granule membrane; ficolin-1-rich granule membrane |
| Biological process | cell adhesion; neutrophil degranulation |
Sources:Amigo / QuickGO
Orthologs
| Databases | NCBI: entry; OMA: entry |
| Species | Human | Mouse |
| Entrez | 8778 | n/a |
| Ensembl | ENSG00000268500 | n/a |
| UniProt | O15389 | n/a |
| RefSeq (mRNA) | NM_003830; NM_001384708; NM_001384709 | n/a |
| RefSeq (protein) | NP_003821 | n/a |
| Location (UCSC) | Chr 19: 51.61 – 51.63 Mb | n/a |
| PubMed search | | n/a |
- Wikidata
| View/Edit Human |

Sialic acid-binding Ig-like lectin 5 is a protein that in humans is encoded by the SIGLEC5 gene. SIGLEC5 has also been designated CD170 (cluster of differentiation 170).
