= Ly49 =

Protein family of membrane receptors

Ly49 is a family of membrane C-type lectin-like receptors expressed mainly on NK cells but also on other immune cells (some CD8+ and CD3+ T lymphocytes, intestinal epithelial lymphocytes (IELs), NKT cells, uterine NK cells (uNK) cells, macrophages or dendritic cells). Their primary role is to bind MHC-I molecules to distinguish between self healthy cells and infected or altered cells. Ly49 family is coded by Klra gene cluster and include genes for both inhibitory and activating paired receptors, but most of them are inhibitory. Inhibitory Ly49 receptors play a role in the recognition of self cells and thus maintain self-tolerance and prevent autoimmunity by suppressing NK cell activation. On the other hand, activating receptors recognise ligands from cancer or viral infected cells (induced-self hypothesis) and are used when cells lack or have abnormal expression of MHC-I molecules (missing-self hypothesis), which activate cytokine production and cytotoxic activity of NK and immune cells.

Ly49 receptors are expressed in some mammals including rodents, cattle and some primates but not in humans. Only one human gene homologous to rodent Ly49 receptors is found in the human genome, KLRA1P (LY49L), however, it represents a non-functional pseudogene. However killer cell immunoglobulin-like receptors (KIR) have the same function in humans. They have different molecular structure but recognise HLA class I molecules as ligands and include both inhibitory (mainly) and activating receptors.

== Function ==
=== Role in NK cells ===
The function of NK cells is the killing of virally infected or cancerous cells. Therefore, they must have a precisely regulated system of self-cell recognition to prevent the destruction of healthy cells. They express several types of inhibitory and activating receptors on their surface, including the Ly49 receptor family, which have roles in NK cell licensing, antiviral, and antitumor immunity.

NK cells are activated when signal from activating receptors outweighs inhibitory signals. This could happen when activating receptors recognise viral proteins presented on infected cell surface (induced-self theory). Some Ly49 receptors have evolved to recognise specific viral proteins, for example Ly49H binds to murine cytomegalovirus (MCMV) glycoprotein m157. Mouse strains without Ly49H are more susceptible to MCMV infection. In addition these Ly49H positive NK cells have properties of MCMV specific memory NK cells and react better during secondary MCMV infections.

Another example of NK cell activation is recognition of tumor cells, which stop expressing MHC I molecules in order to avoid killing by cytotoxic T lymphocytes. Inhibitory receptors of NK cells don't obtain signal resulting in cell activation via activating receptors. This mechanism describes the missing self hypothesis.

In order to be fully functional and have cytotoxic activity, NK cells need to get signals from self-MHC I molecules on inhibitory Ly49 receptors in rodents (KIR in humans) especially during their development. This educational process prevents generation of autoreactive NK cells and it was called "NK cell licensing" by Yokoyama and colleagues. If inhibitory Ly49 receptors miss the signal from MHCI during their development, they are unlicensed (un-educated) and don't react to stimulation on activating receptors. But this hyporesponsive state isn't definite and they can be re-educated in certain conditions. Besides, it has been shown un-educated cells can be activated by certain acute viral infections or by some tumors and kill these cells more efficiently than educated cells.

== Receptor types ==
=== Inhibitory receptors ===
Inhibitory receptors play a role in the NK cell licensing and are important for recognition and tolerance of self cells.

Stimulation of inhibitory receptors leads to phosphorylation of immunoreceptor tyrosine‐based inhibitory motif (ITIM), located in the cytoplasmic part of these receptors. Phosphorylated Ly49 molecule recruits the src homology 2 (SH2) domain containing protein phosphatase SHP-1, which dephosphorylates ITIM and thus prevents cell activation.

Inhibitory receptors include Ly49A, B, C, E, G, Q.

=== Activating receptors ===
Activating receptors are involved in antiviral and antitumor immunity.

They signal through immunoreceptor tyrosine-based activation motif (ITAM) which is part of an associated molecule DAP-12 attached to arginine in the transmembrane segment of Ly49. After stimulation of the receptor and phosphorylation of ITAM, SH2 domain with protein kinase is recruited and that starts kinase signaling cascade leading to activating cell effector functions.

Activating receptors include Ly49D, H, L.
