= SIRPG =

Protein-coding gene in the species Homo sapiens

Identifiers
- Aliases: SIRPG, CD172g, SIRP-B2, SIRPB2, SIRPgamma, bA77C3.1, signal regulatory protein gamma
- External IDs: OMIM: 605466; MGI: 108563; GeneCards: SIRPG
Available structures
| PDB | Ortholog search: PDBe RCSB |
| PDB | List of PDB id codes 2JJW, 4I2X |

Gene location (Human)
| Chr. | Chromosome 20 (human) |
| Band | 20p13 | Start | 1,629,152 bp |
| Band | 20p13 | End | 1,657,779 bp |

Gene location (Mouse)
| Chr. | Chromosome 2 (mouse) |
| Band | 2 F1|2 63.19 cM | Start | 129,434,755 bp |
| Band | 2 F1|2 63.19 cM | End | 129,474,148 bp |
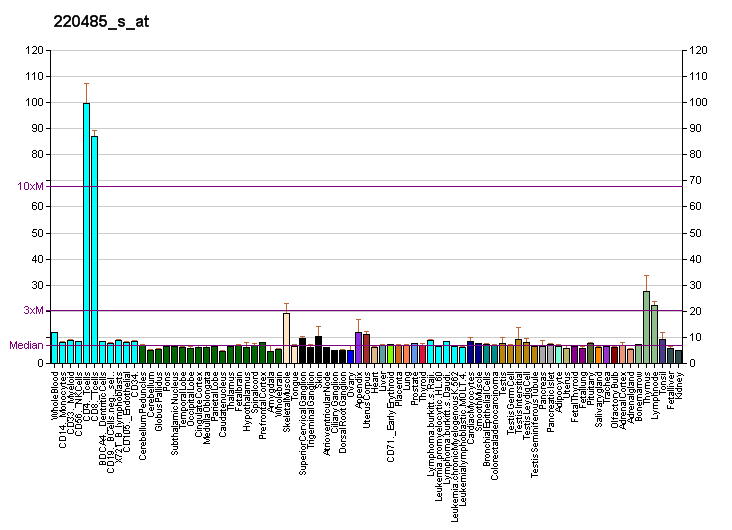
RNA expression pattern
| Bgee | Human / Mouse (ortholog); Top expressed in: thymus; testicle; lymph node; granulocyte; blood; appendix; spleen; mucosa of transverse colon; left testis; right testis / Top expressed in: stroma of bone marrow; granulocyte; prefrontal cortex; superior frontal gyrus; primary visual cortex; dentate gyrus of hippocampal formation granule cell; cerebellar cortex; tibiofemoral joint; perirhinal cortex; entorhinal cortex; More reference expression data |
| BioGPS | More reference expression data |
Gene ontology
| Molecular function | protein binding |
| Cellular component | integral component of membrane; plasma membrane; membrane; intracellular anatomical structure |
| Biological process | cell-cell signaling; cell adhesion; intracellular signal transduction; positive regulation of T cell activation; leukocyte migration; positive regulation of cell population proliferation; negative regulation of cell population proliferation; positive regulation of cell-cell adhesion; positive regulation of phagocytosis |
Sources:Amigo / QuickGO
Orthologs
| Databases | NCBI: entry; OMA: entry |
| Species | Human | Mouse |
| Entrez | 55423 | 19261 |
| Ensembl | ENSG00000089012 | ENSMUSG00000037902 |
| UniProt | Q9P1W8 | P97797 |
| RefSeq (mRNA) | NM_001039508; NM_018556; NM_080816 | NM_001177646; NM_001177647; NM_001291019; NM_001291020; NM_001291021 NM_001291022; NM_007547; NM_001355158; NM_001355160 |
| RefSeq (protein) | NP_001034597; NP_061026; NP_543006 | NP_001171118; NP_001277948; NP_001277949; NP_001277950; NP_001277951 NP_031573; NP_001342087; NP_001342089 |
| Location (UCSC) | Chr 20: 1.63 – 1.66 Mb | Chr 2: 129.43 – 129.47 Mb |
| PubMed search |
- Wikidata
| View/Edit Human | View/Edit Mouse |

Signal-regulatory protein gamma is a protein that in humans is encoded by the SIRPG gene. SIRPG has also recently been designated CD172G (cluster of differentiation 172G).

The protein encoded by this gene is a member of the signal-regulatory protein (SIRP) family, and also belongs to the immunoglobulin superfamily. SIRP family members are receptor-type transmembrane glycoproteins known to be involved in the negative regulation of receptor tyrosine kinase-coupled signaling processes. Alternatively spliced transcript variants encoding different isoforms have been described.
