= Signal-regulatory protein =

Identifiers
- Symbol: SRP
- Membranome: 42

A Signal-regulatory protein (SIRP) is one of a family of transmembrane glycoproteins involved in immunological signalling, expressed mainly by myeloid cells.

Members include :

- Signal-regulatory protein alpha, ligand=CD47
- SIRPB1
- SIRPB2
- SIRPD
- SIRPG, ligand=CD47
