= FCGR2A =

Protein-coding gene in humans

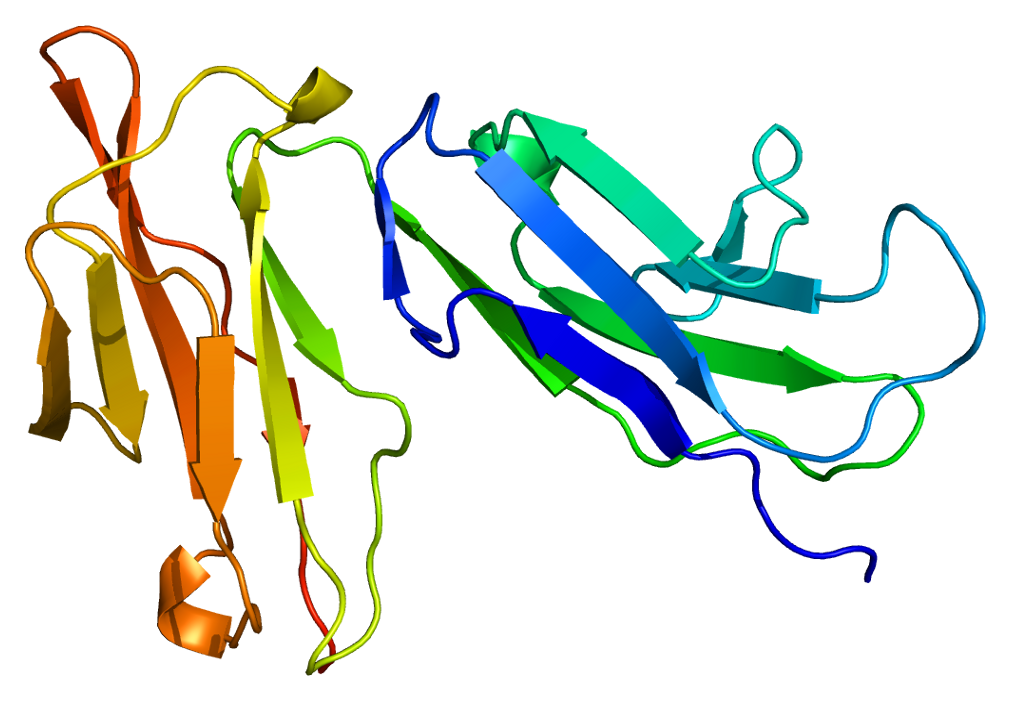

Identifiers
- Aliases: FCGR2A, CD32, CD32A, CDw32, FCG2, FCGR2, FCGR2A1, FcGR, IGFR2, Fc fragment of IgG receptor IIa, FcgammaRIIa, Fc gamma receptor IIa
- External IDs: OMIM: 146790; MGI: 95500; GeneCards: FCGR2A
Available structures
PDB	Ortholog search: PDBe RCSB
PDB	List of PDB id codes 1FCG, 1H9V, 3D5O, 3RY4, 3RY5, 3RY6

Gene location (Human)
Chr.	Chromosome 1 (human)
Band	1q23.3	Start	161,505,430 bp
Band	1q23.3	End	161,524,013 bp

Gene location (Mouse)
Chr.	Chromosome 1 (mouse)
Band	1 H3|1 78.8 cM	Start	170,878,743 bp
Band	1 H3|1 78.8 cM	End	170,892,504 bp
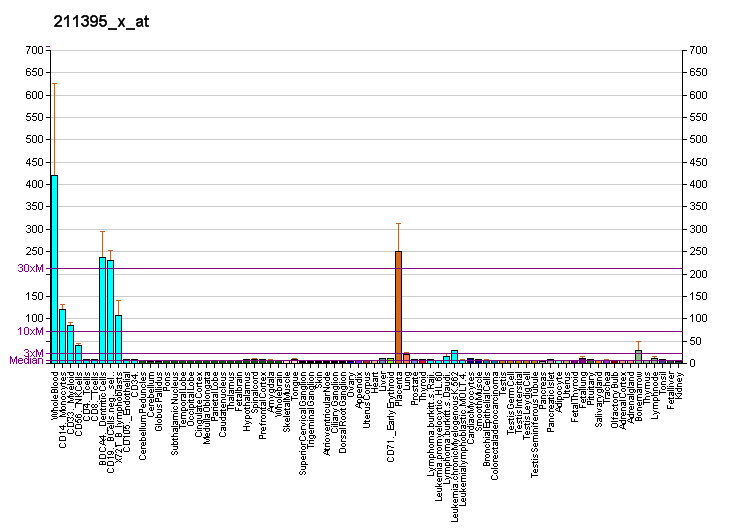

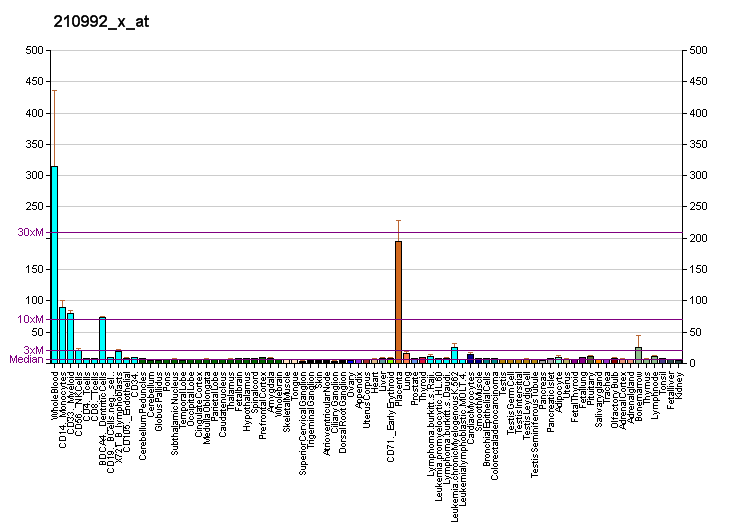

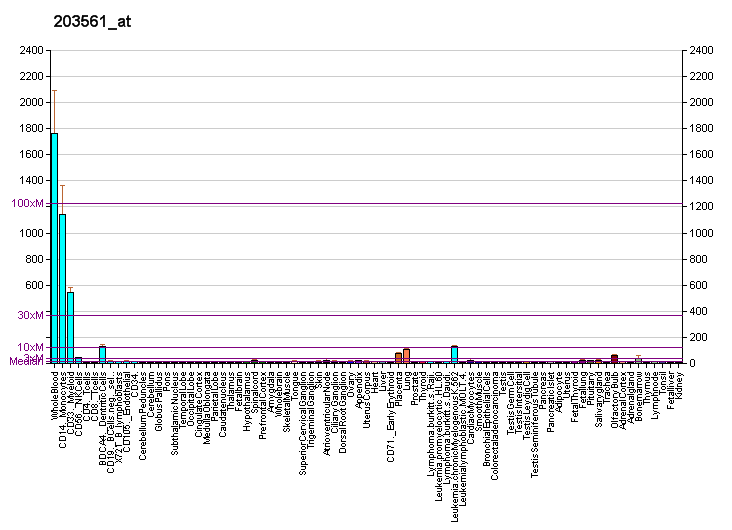
RNA expression pattern
Bgee	Human / Mouse (ortholog); Top expressed in: blood; monocyte; granulocyte; placenta; appendix; right lung; metanephric glomerulus; spleen; upper lobe of left lung; gallbladder / Top expressed in: granulocyte; stroma of bone marrow; spermatocyte; blood; calvaria; umbilical cord; seminiferous tubule; dermis; right lung lobe; tibiofemoral joint; More reference expression data
BioGPS	More reference expression data
Gene ontology
Molecular function	protein binding; IgG binding
Cellular component	integral component of membrane; plasma membrane; membrane; secretory granule membrane; cell wall
Biological process	Fc-gamma receptor signaling pathway involved in phagocytosis; immune system process; neutrophil degranulation; cell adhesion
Sources:Amigo / QuickGO
Orthologs
Databases	NCBI: entry; OMA: entry
Species	Human	Mouse
Entrez	2212	14131
Ensembl	ENSG00000143226	ENSMUSG00000059498
UniProt	P12318	P08508
RefSeq (mRNA)	NM_001136219; NM_021642; NM_001375296; NM_001375297	NM_010188; NM_001356511
RefSeq (protein)	NP_001129691; NP_067674; NP_001362225; NP_001362226	n/a
Location (UCSC)	Chr 1: 161.51 – 161.52 Mb	Chr 1: 170.88 – 170.89 Mb
PubMed search
- Wikidata
View/Edit Human	View/Edit Mouse

Low affinity immunoglobulin gamma Fc region receptor II-a is a protein that in humans is encoded by the FCGR2A gene.

== Interactions ==
FCGR2A has been shown to interact with PIK3R1 and Syk.

== See also ==
- CD32
