= Phosphatidylinositol-3,4,5-trisphosphate 5-phosphatase =

Phosphatase enzyme

Identifiers
- EC no.: 3.1.3.86

Databases
- IntEnz: IntEnz view
- BRENDA: BRENDA entry
- ExPASy: NiceZyme view
- KEGG: KEGG entry
- MetaCyc: metabolic pathway
- PRIAM: profile
- PDB structures: RCSB PDB PDBe PDBsum
Search
- PMC: articles
- PubMed: articles
- NCBI: proteins

Phosphatidylinositol-3,4,5-trisphosphate 5-phosphatase (EC 3.1.3.86, SHIP, p150Ship) is an enzyme with systematic name 1-phosphatidyl-1D-myo-inositol-3,4,5-trisphosphate 5-phosphohydrolase, that has two isoforms: SHIP1 (produced by the gene INPP5D) and SHIP2 (INPPL1).

This enzyme catalyses the following chemical reaction

1-phosphatidyl-1D-myo-inositol 3,4,5-trisphosphate + H_{2}O $\rightleftharpoons$
1-phosphatidyl-1D-myo-inositol 3,4-bisphosphate + phosphate

This enzyme hydrolyses 1-phosphatidyl-1D-myo-inositol 3,4,5-trisphosphate (PtdIns(3,4,5)P_{3}) to produce PtdIns(3,4)P_{2}.
