= FCGR2C =

Protein-coding gene in the species Homo sapiens

Identifiers
- Aliases: FCGR2C, CD32, CD32C, CDW32, FCG2, FCRIIC, IGFR2, Fc fragment of IgG receptor IIc (gene/pseudogene), FcgammaRIIc, Fc gamma receptor IIc (gene/pseudogene)
- External IDs: OMIM: 612169; GeneCards: FCGR2C
Available structures
PDB	Human UniProt search: PDBe RCSB
PDB	List of PDB id codes 3WJL

Gene location (Human)
Chr.	Chromosome 1 (human)
Band	1q23.3	Start	161,581,339 bp
Band	1q23.3	End	161,605,662 bp
Gene ontology
Molecular function	protein binding; IgG binding; transmembrane signaling receptor activity
Cellular component	cytoplasm; integral component of membrane; plasma membrane; membrane
Biological process	immune response; signal transduction
Sources:Amigo / QuickGO
Orthologs
Databases	NCBI: entry; OMA: entry
Species	Human	Mouse
Entrez	9103	n/a
Ensembl	ENSG00000244682	n/a
UniProt	P31995	n/a
RefSeq (mRNA)	NM_001005410; NM_001005411; NM_001005412; NM_201563	n/a
RefSeq (protein)	NP_963857	n/a
Location (UCSC)	Chr 1: 161.58 – 161.61 Mb	n/a
PubMed search		n/a
- Wikidata
View/Edit Human

Fc fragment of IgG receptor IIc (gene/pseudogene) is a protein that in humans is encoded by the FCGR2C gene.

== Function ==
This gene encodes one of three members of a family of low-affinity immunoglobulin gamma Fc receptors found on the surface of many immune response cells. The encoded protein is a transmembrane glycoprotein and may be involved in phagocytosis and clearing of immune complexes. An allelic polymorphism in this gene results in both coding and non-coding variants.
