= Immunoreceptor tyrosine-based inhibitory motif =

Sequence of amino acids

An immunoreceptor tyrosine-based inhibitory motif (ITIM), is a conserved sequence of amino acids that is found intracellularly in the cytoplasmic domains of many inhibitory receptors of the non-catalytic tyrosine-phosphorylated receptor family found on immune cells. These immune cells include T cells, B cells, NK cells, dendritic cells, macrophages and mast cells. ITIMs have similar structures of S/I/V/LxYxxI/V/L, where x is any amino acid, Y is a tyrosine residue that can be phosphorylated, S is the amino acid serine, I is the amino acid isoleucine, and V is the amino acid valine. ITIMs recruit SH2 domain-containing phosphatases, which inhibit cellular activation. ITIM-containing receptors often serve to target immunoreceptor tyrosine-based activation motif (ITAM)-containing receptors, resulting in an innate inhibition mechanism within cells. ITIM bearing receptors have important role in regulation of immune system allowing negative regulation at different levels of the immune response.

A list of human candidate ITIM-containing proteins has been generated by proteome-wide scans. It has included more than 135 proteins with ITIM motif. This list is reportedly expanded by studying rare human SNPs that create the consensus signature S/I/V/LxYxxI/V/L motif.

== Structure ==
ITIM motifs are defined as six amino acid signature with the consensus sequence S/I/V/LxYxxL/V, where x stands for any amino acid, Y for a tyrosine residue that can be phosphorylated and S, I, V for amino acids serine, isoleucine, and valine, respectively. ITIM conserved sequence was first identified in the low affinity IgG receptor FcγRIIB. All ITIM containing receptors are a part of the immunoglobulin superfamily.

== Signaling by ITIM ==
The main characteristic of ITIM-containing molecules is that they become tyrosyl-phosphorylated. In order to become phosphorylated, the inhibitory receptor has to be brought in close proximity to the kinase. This may be achieved by co-crosslinking with an ITAM motif of activating receptor that recruits a Src family kinase. ITIMs place phosphatases near ITAM-containing receptors, allowing phosphatases to dephosphorylate. This results in the deactivation of the signaling pathway of the ITAM-related receptor. Ligand independent phosphorylation of ITIM-bearing molecules may also occur.

Phosphorylated ITIM molecules then recruit SH2 domain-containing phosphatases. Four SH2 domain-containing phosphatases have been identified: the two lipid phosphatases SHIP1 and SHIP2 and the two protein tyrosine phosphatases (PTPs) SHP-1 and SHP-2. The dephosphorylation of cell activation critical substrates results due to phosphorylated ITIM's serving as recruitment sites for SHP-1 and SHP-2. The vast majority of ITIM-containing receptors were found to recruit either SHIPs or SHPs. These phosphatases inhibit activation of molecules involved in cell signaling, most commonly by binding to activating receptors including TCRs, BCRs and FcRs. Subsequently, phospholipase Cy and phosphatidylinositol 3-kinase (PLCy and PI3-K) are activated, together leading to the production of phosphoinositol messengers and increase in cytoplasmic Ca^{2+}.

=== SHIP ===
Several ITIM-bearing receptors bind SHIP, including FcγRIIB. SHIP is a 5′ inositol phosphatase that is expressed in most hematopoietic cells. It plays an important regulatory role in the immune system. SHIP consists of an N-terminal SH2 domain, a catalytic domain and a C-terminal tail that contains two phosphorylation sites. There are several isoforms of SHIP and the expression of these isoforms differs among different cell types. In addition, another SHIP gene, SHIP-2, has been identified. SHIP-2 is also expressed in non-hematopoietic cells.

The binding of SHIP to ITIM-bearing receptors is mediated by the SH2 domain. There are several mechanisms by which SHIP can inhibit cell activation. These can be divided into mechanisms that involve the catalytic activity of SHIP and mechanisms that involve interactions of other molecules with the C-terminal part of SHIP.

=== SHP ===
Many ITIM-bearing receptors recruit SHP-1 and/or SHP-2 including KIRs, ILT, Ly49, LAIR-1, CD22, CD72 and Signal Regulatory Protein SIRPα. SHP-1 and SHP-2 are structurally related protein tyrosine phosphatases but have different expression patterns and biological functions. SHP-1 is expressed in hematopoietic cells and at lower levels in epithelial cells. Like SHIP, SHP-1 is involved in the negative regulation of cell activation following a variety of stimuli such as growth factors, cytokines, integrin signaling and antigen receptor signaling.

SHP-2 is ubiquitously expressed and is considered a positive regulator of cytokine and growth factor receptor signaling. SHP-1 and SHP-2 consist of two SH-2 domains, a catalytic domain and a C-terminal tail. The N-terminal SH2 domain is involved in an auto-inhibitory mechanism, as removal of this domain activates the phosphatase.

Recruitment of either SHIP or SHP-1 by ITIM-bearing receptors has different outcomes: recruitment of SHP-1 abrogates tyrosine phosphorylation of signaling molecules that would occur upon triggering of an ITAM-bearing receptor, while SHIP recruitment does not affect the initial phosphorylation, but interferes with the recruitment of downstream effectors to the site of cell activation. ITIMs can also work in conjunction with immunoreceptor tyrosine-based switch motifs (ITSM) in order to activate ITIM-bearing receptors such as SHP-2.

== Negative vs. positive signaling ==
Even if the most receptors containing ITIM are considered to have inhibitory effects on signaling pathways of immune response, the function of SIRPα, CD22 and also PECAM-1, which is expressed on immune cells and endothelium and is involved in many signaling pathways, show that not all so called ITIM-bearing receptors can be considered to be inhibitory receptors. Several other proteins that are usually considered as stimulatory receptors contain ITIM-like sequences, e.g. IL-4. In contrast, the activating NK cell receptor NKp44 contains an ITIM, but this seems to be non-functional.

== Inhibitory receptors bearing ITIM ==
Some of the important receptors bearing ITIM motifs are listed in the table below:

Receptor	Distribution	Number of ITIMs	Ligand	Associated phosphatases
FcγRIIB	B, My, mast	1	IgG complex	SHIP-1, SHIP-2
CTLA-4	T	-	CD80, CD86	SHP-2
PD-1	T, B, NK	1	PD-1 ligand	SHP-2
BTLA	T, B	2	HVEM	SHP-2
CD72	B	2	CD100	SHP-1
NKG2A	NK, CD8^{+}T	2	HLA-E	SHP-1, SHP-2
CD31	My, platelet, EC, T, NK	1	CD31	SHP-1, SHP-2
SIGLEC family	Hm	1-4	Sialic acid	SHP-1, SHP-2
CD66	Hm, EC	2	CD66	SHP-1, SHP-2
ILTs/LIRs	My, B, NK, T	2-4	MHC I	SHP-1

My, myeloid; Hm, hematopoietic; NK, natural killer; EC, epithelial cells; DC, dendritic cells.

(Modified according to)

== In immunotherapy ==
On the basis of the inhibitory effects of FcγRIIB, a lot of prototypic molecules was constructed and used for developing new therapeutic approaches of allergies. A genetically engineered molecule consisting of a human IgG1 Fc fragment fused to a human IgE Fc fragment was first reported to inhibit IgE-induced human mast cell and basophil activation.

In selected human malignancies such as acute myeloid leukemia, allogeneic hematopoietic cell transplantations have shown that the development of donor NK cells in recipient patients lacking donor KIR ligands can lead to improved engraftment and post-transplant survival by boosting graft-versus-leukemia effect in the absence of graft-versus-host disease.
